= Rachel Griffith =

British economist (born 1963)

Dame Rachel Griffith DBE FBA FAcSS
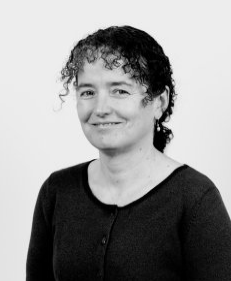
- Born: Rachel Susan Griffith; 16 May 1963 (age 63)

Academic background
- Education: University of Keele

Academic work
- Discipline: Economics
- Institutions: University of Manchester; Institute for Fiscal Studies; Royal Economic Society
- Awards: Brigit Grodal Award 2014
- Website: Information at IDEAS / RePEc

Notes
- Thesis Taxes, the location of multinationals and productivity: an empirical analysis using panel data. (1999)

Dame Rachel Susan Griffith DBE FBA FAcSS (born 16 May 1963) is a British and American academic and educator. She is professor of economics at the University of Manchester and a research director at the Institute for Fiscal Studies.

Griffith was president of the European Economic Association for 2015, making her the first woman to hold the position. She was also joint managing editor of The Economic Journal between 2011 and 2017.

Griffith holds both UK and US citizenship.

== Education ==
Griffith earned her BA degree magna cum laude in Economics from the University of Massachusetts, Boston in 1985, her MSc degree in econometrics and forecasting from the City of London Polytechnic in 1991, and her PhD from Keele University in 1999.

== Career ==
Griffith is currently Research Director of the IFS and co-director of the Centre for the Microeconomic Analysis of Public Policy (CPP). She was elected President of the Royal Economic Society from 2019 to 2020.

She is a Fellow of the British Academy, a Fellow of the Econometric Society, a Foreign Honorary Member of the American Economic Association and a Research Fellow of CEPR. She won the Birgit Grodal Award (2014), was awarded a CBE in for services to economic policy in 2015 and was elevated to Dame Commander of the Order of the British Empire (DBE) in the 2021 New Year Honours for services to economic policy and education.

She served as Deputy Chair of the Economics sub-Panel of the Research Excellence Framework. Currently, she has her second ERC Advanced Grant to study behavior of consumers and firms to see how government policy will impact food markets.

== Research ==
=== Obesity ===
Griffith's presidential address to the European Economic Association at the University of Mannheim, Germany entitled "Gluttony and Sloth? Labour Market Nonseparabilities and the Rise in Obesity", reflected her recent research into the relationship between changes in relative food prices and the nutritional quality of households' shopping baskets.

=== Corporation tax ===
In her Royal Economic Society Public Lecture 2015, "Does Starbucks Pay Enough Tax", Griffith argued that corporate tax should be charged like VAT. Griffith stated that the current system of corporate taxation is outdated and taxing corporate profits in the location where value is created is not very meaningful. She suggested taxing profits at the destination of sales rather than at the source of profits would be an improvement. Griffith cited two papers, one by Auerbach and Devereux (2012), the other by Devereux and Vella (2014), in support of her case. Griffith's previous research in this area considers how influential corporate income taxes are in determining where firms choose to legally own intellectual property, i.e. the way in which intellectual property accounts for firms' assets and if they can be used by firms to shift income offshore to reduce their corporate income tax liability.

== Honours and Fellowships ==
- 1999: Research Fellow Centre for Economic Policy Research (CEPR)
- 2011: Elected to the Fellowship of the British Academy (FBA).
- 2014: Birgit Grodal Award.
- 2015: Distinguished Achievement Medal - Researcher of the Year, University of Manchester Faculty of Humanities
- 2015: President European Economic Association
- 2015: The Schumpeter School Award for Business and Economic Analysis, Wuppertal Germany,
- 2015: Commander of the British Empire (CBE) for services to economic policy
- 2016: Elected as Fellow of the Econometric Society.
- 2017 :Elected a Fellow of the Academy of Social Sciences (FAcSS).
- 2018-2019: Elected President of the Royal Economic Society
- 2019-2021: Elected President of the Royal Economic Society

== Bibliography ==
=== Thesis ===
- Griffith, Rachel (1999). Taxes, the location of multinationals and productivity: an empirical analysis using panel data (PhD thesis). University of Keele. OCLC 556724027.

=== Books ===
- Griffith, Rachel; Aghion, Philippe (2005). Competition and growth: reconciling theory and evidence. Cambridge, Massachusetts: MIT Press. ISBN 9780262012188. PREVIEW

=== Chapters in books ===
- Griffith, Rachel; Blundell, Richard; Windmeijer, Frank (1995), "Dynamics and correlated Responses in longitudinal count data models", in Seeber, Gilg U.H.; Francis, Brian J.; Hatzinger, Reinhold; Steckel-Berger, Gabriele (eds.), Statistical modelling: proceedings of the 10th International Workshop on Statistical Modelling, Innsbruck, Austria, 10–14 July, 1995, Lecture Notes in Statistics Series: Volume 104, New York: Springer-Verlag, pp. 35–42, ISBN 9780387945651 VIEW ONLINE
- Griffith, Rachel; Bloom, Nicholas; Chennells, Lucy; Van Reenen, John (2002), "How has tax affected the changing cost of R&D? Evidence from eight countries", in Lawton Smith, Helen (ed.), The regulation of science and technology, Houndmills, Basingstoke, UK/New York: Palgrave Macmillan, pp. 136–160, ISBN 9780230554528 AVAILABLE ONLINE
- Griffith, Rachel; Simpson, Helen (2004), "Characteristics of foreign-owned firms on UK manufacturing productivity", in Card, David; Blundell, Richard; Freeman, Richard B. (eds.), Seeking a premier economy the economic effects of British economic reforms, 1980–2000, Chicago: University of Chicago Press for the NBER, pp. 147–80, ISBN 9780226092843 IFS WP01/10 PDF
- Griffith, Rachel; Geroski, Paul (2004), "Identifying antitrust markets", in Neumann, Manfred; Weigand, Jürgen (eds.), The international handbook of competition, Cheltenham, UK/Northampton, MA, USA: Edward Elgar, pp. 290–305, ISBN 9781845423520 IFS WP03/01 PDF
- Griffith, Rachel; Hines, James; Sørensen, Peter Birch (2010), "International capital taxation", in Mirrlees, James (ed.), The Mirrlees Review: volume 1: dimensions of tax design (reforming the tax system for the 21st century), Oxford, UK/New York: Oxford University Press, pp. 914–1027, ISBN 9780199553754 IFS PDF

See also: The Mirrlees Review.

=== Academic outputs ===
- Griffith, Rachel. "Product Market Competition, Creative Destruction and Innovation -.” The Institute for Fiscal Studies, 3 December 2021, ifs.org.uk/publications/15863.
- Griffith, Rachel. "Price Floors and Externality Correction -.” The Institute for Fiscal Studies, 15 November 2021, ifs.org.uk/publications/15827.

=== Reports and comment ===
- Freeman, Harold. "Surplus ACT: A Solution in Sight? -.” The Institute for Fiscal Studies, 1 September 1993, ifs.org.uk/publications/1915.
- Chennells, Lucy. "Taxing Profits in a Changing World -.” The Institute for Fiscal Studies, 1 September 1997, ifs.org.uk/publications/1885.
- Griffith, Rachel. "Productivity and the Role of Government -.” The Institute for Fiscal Studies, 1 November 1998, ifs.org.uk/publications/1886.
- Dias, Monica Costa. "Getting People Back into Work -.” The Institute for Fiscal Studies, 4 May 2020, ifs.org.uk/publications/14829.
- Griffith, Rachel. "Tackling Heavy Drinking through Tax Reform and Minimum Unit Pricing -.” The Institute for Fiscal Studies, 20 November 2020, ifs.org.uk/publications/15183.

=== Journal articles ===
- Griffith, Rachel; Freeman, Harold (November 1993). "Surplus ACT – a solution in sight?". Fiscal Studies. 14 (4): 58–73. doi:10.1111/j.1475-5890.1993.tb00438.x. PDF
- Griffith, Rachel; Van Reenen, John (January–February 1995). "Promoting R&D through tax incentives: an assessment of the arguments". Science in Parliament. 52 (1).
- Griffith, Rachel; Blundell, Richard; Van Reenen, John (March 1995). "Dynamic Count Data Models of Technological Innovation". The Economic Journal. 105 (429): 333–44. doi:10.2307/2235494. JSTOR 2235494. PDF
- Griffith, Rachel; Sandler, Daniel; Van Reenen, John (May 1995). "Tax incentives for R&D". Fiscal Studies. 16 (2): 21–44. doi:10.1111/j.1475-5890.1995.tb00220.x. S2CID 153466204. PDF
- Griffith, Rachel (August 1996). "A Note on the Taxation of Capital Income in the Czech Republic and Poland" (PDF). Fiscal Studies. 17 (3): 91–103. doi:10.1111/j.1475-5890.1996.tb00495.x. PDF
- Griffith, Rachel; Devereux, Michael P. (June 1998). "Taxes and the location of production: evidence from a panel of US multinationals". Journal of Public Economics. 68 (3): 335–67. Bibcode:1998JPubE..68..335D. doi:10.1016/S0047-2727(98)00014-0. PDF
- Griffith, Rachel (June 1999). "Using the ARD Establishment Level Data to Look at Foreign Ownership and Productivity in the United Kingdom". The Economic Journal. 109 (456): F416–F442. doi:10.1111/1468-0297.00443. JSTOR 2566013. PDF
- Griffith, Rachel; Blundell, Richard; Van Reenen, John (July 1999). "Market Share, Market Value and Innovation in a Panel of British Manufacturing Firms". The Review of Economic Studies. 66 (3): 529–54. Bibcode:1999RvES...66..529B. doi:10.1111/1467-937X.00097. JSTOR 2567013. PDF
- Griffith, Rachel; Devereux, Michael P. (2000). "The impact of corporate taxation on the location of capital". Swedish Economic Policy Review. 9 (1): 79–102. PDF
- Griffith, Rachel; Bloom, Nicholas (September 2001). "The Internationalisation of UK R&D". Fiscal Studies. 22 (3): 337–55. doi:10.1111/j.1475-5890.2001.tb00045.x. S2CID 154758907. PDF
- Griffith, Rachel; Redding, Stephen; Van Reenen, John (September 2001). "Measuring the cost effectiveness of an R&D tax credit for the UK". Fiscal Studies. 22 (3): 375–99. doi:10.1111/j.1475-5890.2001.tb00047.x.
- Griffith, Rachel; Devereux, Michael P.; Klemm, Alexander (October 2002). "Corporate Income Tax Reforms and International Tax Competition". Economic Policy. 17 (35): 449–95. doi:10.1111/1468-0327.00094. JSTOR 1344772. PDF
- Griffith, Rachel; Blundell, Richard; Windmeijer, Frank (May 2002). "Individual effects and dynamics in count data models" (PDF). Journal of Econometrics. 108 (1): 113–31. doi:10.1016/S0304-4076(01)00108-7. PDF
- Griffith, Rachel; Bloom, Nicholas; Van Reenen, John (July 2002). "Do R&D tax credits work? Evidence from a panel of countries 1979–1997" (PDF). Journal of Public Economics. 85 (1): 1–31. doi:10.1016/S0047-2727(01)00086-X. PDF
- Griffith, Rachel; Devereux, Michael P. (March 2003). "Evaluating Tax Policy for Location Decisions". International Tax and Public Finance. 10 (2): 107–26. doi:10.1023/A:1023364421914. S2CID 14438966. SSRN 306762. PDF
- Griffith, Rachel; Redding, Stephen; Van Reenen, John (March 2003). "R&D and Absorptive Capacity: Theory and Empirical Evidence". The Scandinavian Journal of Economics. 105 (1): 99–118. doi:10.1111/1467-9442.00007. JSTOR 3440923.
- Griffith, Rachel; Aghion, Philippe; Blundell, Richard; Howitt, Peter; Prantl, Susanne (April–May 2004). "Entry and productivity growth: evidence from micro-level data". Journal of the European Economic Association. 2 (2–3): 265–76. doi:10.1162/154247604323067970. JSTOR 40004902. S2CID 7729165. PDF
- Griffith, Rachel; Redding, Stephen; Simpson, Helen (September 2004). "Foreign ownership and productivity: new evidence from the service sector and the R&D lab" (PDF). Oxford Review of Economic Policy. 20 (3): 440–56. doi:10.1093/oxrep/grh026. PDF
- Griffith, Rachel; Devereux, Michael P.; Simpson, Helen (September 2004). "The geographic distribution of production activity in the UK" (PDF). Regional Science and Urban Economics. 34 (5): 533–64. Bibcode:2004RSUE...34..533D. doi:10.1016/S0166-0462(03)00073-5. PDF
- Griffith, Rachel; Redding, Stephen; Van Reenen, John (November 2004). "Mapping the two faces of R&D: productivity growth in a panel of OECD industries" (PDF). The Review of Economics and Statistics. 86 (4): 883–95. doi:10.1162/0034653043125194. JSTOR 40042976. PDF
- Griffith, Rachel; Devereux, Michael P.; Klemm, Alexander (December 2004). "Why has the UK corporation tax raised so much revenue?". Fiscal Studies. 25 (4): 367–88. doi:10.1111/j.1475-5890.2004.tb00543.x. PDF
- Griffith, Rachel; Aghion, Philippe; Bloom, Nick; Blundell, Richard; Howitt, Peter (May 2005). "Competition and innovation: an inverted–U relationship". Quarterly Journal of Economics. 120 (2): 701–28. doi:10.1093/qje/120.2.701. JSTOR 25098750. PDF
  The data used in this paper is available here.
- Griffith, Rachel; Harmgart, Heike (July 2005). "Retail productivity". The International Review of Retail, Distribution and Consumer Research. 15 (3): 281–90. doi:10.1080/09593960500119481. S2CID 219640033. PDF
- Griffith, Rachel; Abramovsky, Laura (April–May 2006). "Outsourcing and offshoring of business services: how important is ICT?" (PDF). Journal of the European Economic Association. 4 (2–3): 594–601. doi:10.1162/jeea.2006.4.2-3.594. JSTOR 40005125. PDF
- Griffith, Rachel; Aghion, Philippe; Howitt, Peter (May 2006). "Vertical integration and competition". The American Economic Review. 96 (2): 97–102. doi:10.1257/000282806777211595. JSTOR 30034622. S2CID 55233427. PDF
- Griffith, Rachel; Aghion, Philippe; Howitt, Peter (September–December 2006). "U-shaped relationship between vertical integration and competition: theory and evidence". International Journal of Economic Theory. 2 (3–4): 351–63. doi:10.1111/j.1742-7363.2006.0040.x. PDF
- Griffith, Rachel; Harrison, Rupert; Van Reenen, John (December 2006). "How special is the special relationship? Using the impact of US R&D spillovers on UK firms as a test of technology sourcing". The American Economic Review. 96 (5): 1859–75. doi:10.1257/aer.96.5.1859. JSTOR 30035000. PDF
  The data used in this paper is available here
- Griffith, Rachel; Huergo, Elena; Mairesse, Jacques; Peters, Bettina (Winter 2006). "Innovation and productivity across four European countries" (PDF). Oxford Review of Economic Policy. 22 (4): 483–98. doi:10.1093/oxrep/grj028. S2CID 153560017. PDF
- Griffith, Rachel; Haskel, Jonathan; Neely, Andy (Winter 2006). "Why is productivity so dispersed?". Oxford Review of Economic Policy. 22 (4): 513–25. doi:10.1093/oxrep/grj030. hdl:1826/3304. PDF
- Griffith, Rachel; Harrison, Rupert; Macartney, Gareth (March 2007). "Product market reforms, labour market institutions and unemployment" (PDF). The Economic Journal. 117 (519): C142–66. doi:10.1111/j.1468-0297.2007.02039.x. JSTOR 4625503. S2CID 39370625. PDF
  The data used in this paper is available here, the do file that recreates the main tables is here
- Griffith, Rachel; Devereux, Michael P.; Simpson, Helen (April 2007). "Firm location decisions, regional grants and agglomeration externalities". Journal of Public Economics. 91 (3–4): 413–35. doi:10.1016/j.jpubeco.2006.12.002. PDF
- Griffith, Rachel (September 2007). "Technology, productivity and public policy". Fiscal Studies. 28 (3): 273–91. doi:10.1111/j.1475-5890.2007.00057.x. S2CID 9545709. PDF
- Griffith, Rachel; Neely, Andrew (January 2009). "Performance pay and managerial experience in multi-task teams: evidence from within a firm". Journal of Labor Economics. 27 (1): 49–82. doi:10.1086/596324. JSTOR 10.1086/596324. S2CID 37351541. PDF
- Griffith, Rachel; Aghion, Philippe; Blundell, Richard; Howitt, Peter; Prantl, Susanne (February 2009). "The effects of entry on incumbent innovation and productivity". The Review of Economics and Statistics. 91 (1): 20–32. Bibcode:2009RvE&S..91...20A. doi:10.1162/rest.91.1.20. JSTOR 25651315. S2CID 5159034. PDF
- Griffith, Rachel; Leibtag, Ephraim; Leicester, Andrew; Nevo, Aviv (Spring 2009). "Consumer shopping behavior: how much do consumers save?". Journal of Economic Perspectives. 23 (2): 99–120. doi:10.1257/jep.23.2.99. JSTOR 27740526. PDF
- Griffith, Rachel; Redding, Stephen; Simpson, Helen (October 2009). "Technological catch-up and geographic proximity". Journal of Regional Science. 49 (4): 689–720. Bibcode:2009JRegS..49..689G. doi:10.1111/j.1467-9787.2009.00630.x. S2CID 44249011. PDF
- Griffith, Rachel; O'Connell, Martin (December 2009). "The use of scanner data for research into nutrition". Fiscal Studies. 30 (3–4): 339–65. doi:10.1111/j.1475-5890.2009.00099.x. S2CID 154906742. PDF
- Griffith, Rachel; Harrison, Rupert; Simpson, Helen (June 2010). "Product Market Reform and Innovation in the EU" (PDF). The Scandinavian Journal of Economics. 112 (2): 389–415. doi:10.1111/j.1467-9442.2010.01602.x. JSTOR 40783348. S2CID 13857108. PDF
- Griffith, Rachel; Acemoğlu, Daron; Aghion, Philippe; Zilibotti, Fabrizio (September 2010). "Vertical integration and technology: theory and evidence". Journal of the European Economic Association. 8 (5): 989–1033. doi:10.1111/j.1542-4774.2010.tb00546.x. hdl:1721.1/60334. JSTOR 25700913. PDF
- Griffith, Rachel; O'Connell, Martin (December 2010). "Public policy towards food consumption". Fiscal Studies. 31 (4): 481–507. doi:10.1111/j.1475-5890.2010.00122.x. S2CID 154004128. PDF
- Griffith, Rachel; Lee, Sokbae; Van Reenen, John (July 2011). "Is distance dying at last? Falling home bias in fixed effects models of patent citations". Quantitative Economics. 2 (2): 211–49. doi:10.3982/QE59. hdl:10419/150321. PDF
- Griffith, Rachel; Nesheim, Lars (August 2013). "Hedonic methods for baskets of goods". Economics Letters. 120 (2): 284–87. doi:10.1016/j.econlet.2013.04.040. PDF
- Griffith, Rachel; Macartney, Gareth (March 2014). "Employment protection legislation, multinational firms, and innovation". The Review of Economics and Statistics. 96 (1): 135–50. doi:10.1162/REST_a_00348. S2CID 51821278. PDF
  The data and Stata do files used in this paper are available here
- Griffith, Rachel; Dubois, Pierre; Nevo, Aviv (March 2014). "Do prices and attributes explain international differences in food purchases?". The American Economic Review. 104 (3): 832–67. doi:10.1257/aer.104.3.832. S2CID 2687358. PDF
- Griffith, Rachel; Miller, Helen; O'Connell, Martin (April 2014). "Ownership of intellectual property and corporate taxation". Journal of Public Economics. 112: 12–23. doi:10.1016/j.jpubeco.2014.01.009. PDF
- Griffith, Rachel; O'Connell, Martin; Smith, Kate (Spring 2015). "Relative prices, consumer preferences, and the demand for food". Oxford Review of Economic Policy. 31 (1): 116–30. doi:10.1093/oxrep/grv004. PDF
- Griffith, Rachel. "Shopping around: How Households Adjusted Food Spending over the Great Recession -.” The Institute for Fiscal Studies, 1 April 2016, ifs.org.uk/publications/8190.
- Griffith, Rachel. "The Importance of Product Reformulation versus Consumer Choice in Improving Diet Quality -.” The Institute for Fiscal Studies, 11 May 2016, ifs.org.uk/publications/8899.
- Abramovsky, Laura. "Domestic Effects of Offshoring High-Skilled Jobs: Complementarities in Knowledge Production -.” The Institute for Fiscal Studies, 19 June 2016, ifs.org.uk/publications/8334.
- Griffith, Rachel; Lührmann, Melanie; Lluberas, Rodrigo (June 2016). "Gluttony and sloth? Calories, labour market activity and the rise of obesity ", forthcoming in Journal of the European Economic Association
- Griffith, Rachel. "Recombinant Innovation and the Boundaries of the Firm -.” The Institute for Fiscal Studies, 1 January 2017, ifs.org.uk/publications/8739.
- Dubois, Pierre & Griffith, Rachel & O'Connell, Martin, 2016. "The effects of banning advertising in junk food markets," CEPR Discussion Papers 11316, C.E.P.R. Discussion Papers.
- Griffith, Rachel. "Income Effects and the Welfare Consequences of Tax in Differentiated Product Oligopoly -.” The Institute for Fiscal Studies, 17 November 2017, ifs.org.uk/publications/10158.
- Griffith, Rachel. "Corrective Taxation and Internalities from Food Consumption -.” The Institute for Fiscal Studies, 20 November 2017, ifs.org.uk/publications/10165.
- Griffith, Rachel. "Getting a Healthy Start: The Effectiveness of Targeted -.” The Institute for Fiscal Studies, 1 March 2018, ifs.org.uk/publications/14043.
- Griffith, Rachel. "Why Do Retailers Advertise Store Brands Differently across Product Categories? -.” The Institute for Fiscal Studies, 22 March 2019, ifs.org.uk/publications/14081.
- Griffith, Rachel. "Tax Design in the Alcohol Market -.” The Institute for Fiscal Studies, 1 April 2019, ifs.org.uk/publications/13826.
- Dias, Monica Costa. "Getting People Back into Work -.” The Institute for Fiscal Studies, 11 May 2020, ifs.org.uk/publications/14851.
- Griffith, Rachel. "What’s on the Menu? Policies to Reduce Young People’s Sugar Consumption -.” The Institute for Fiscal Studies, 21 May 2020, ifs.org.uk/publications/15805.
- Cherchye, Laurens. "A New Year, a New You? Within-Individual Variation in Food Purchases -.” The Institute for Fiscal Studies, 1 June 2020, ifs.org.uk/publications/14866.
- Griffith, Rachel. "The Impact of COVID‐19 on Share Prices in the UK -.” The Institute for Fiscal Studies, 1 June 2020, ifs.org.uk/publications/15034.
- Blundell, Richard. "Could COVID‐19 Infect the Consumer Prices Index? -.” The Institute for Fiscal Studies, 3 June 2020, ifs.org.uk/publications/15033.
- Dubois, Pierre. "How Well Targeted Are Soda Taxes? -.” The Institute for Fiscal Studies, 6 August 2020, ifs.org.uk/publications/14972.
