= Stan Zin =

Canadian economist (born 1958)

Stanley E. Zin
- Born: May 3, 1958 (age 68); Windsor, Ontario

Academic background
- Education: University of Windsor (BA); Wayne State University (MA); University of Toronto (PhD)
- Doctoral advisor: Dale J. Poirier
- Influences: Lars Peter Hansen; Thomas J. Sargent; Robert Lucas Jr. Edward C. Prescott; Larry G. Epstein; David K. Backus

Academic work
- Discipline: Finance; Macroeconomics
- Institutions: New York University; Carnegie Mellon University; National Bureau of Economic Research
- Notable ideas: Epstein–Zin preferences
- Awards: Frisch Medal

Stanley Eugene Zin is a Canadian economist. He is the William R. Berkley Professor Economics and Business at the Leonard N. Stern School of Business, New York University.

His research interests are in the areas of asset pricing and macroeconomics. He is well known for his work on Epstein–Zin preferences which provide a recursive specification of a utility function which separates the elasticity of intertemporal substitution from the coefficient of relative risk aversion. He has created over 70 articles. For this contribution he was awarded the Frisch Medal by the Econometric Society.

Previously, from 1988 to 2009 he was the Richard M. Cyert and Morris H. DeGroot Professor of Economics and Statistics at the David A. Tepper School of Business (previously the Graduate School of Industrial Administration) at Carnegie Mellon University, and is a research associate at the National Bureau of Economic Research.

Zin received his undergraduate education at the University of Windsor (B.A. in economics; 1979) and his graduate training at Wayne State University (Master of Economics; 1981), and the University of Toronto (Ph.D. in economics; 1987).
