= Alan S. Duncan =

British economist and econometrician

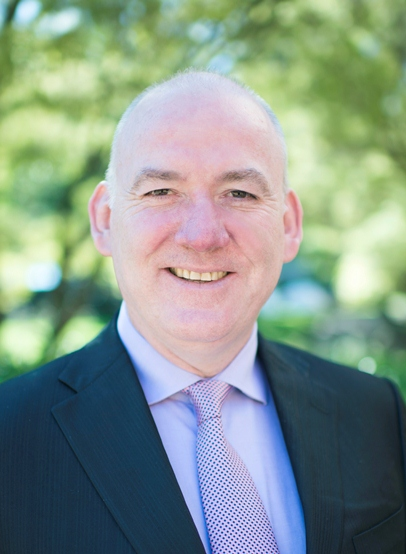
- Alan S. Duncan
- Born: 13 January 1965 (age 61); Gateshead, Tyne and Wear, England

Academic background
- Education: University of York; University of Manchester

Academic work
- Discipline: Econometrics
- Institutions: Curtin University
- Awards: Frisch Medal (2000)
- Website: Information at IDEAS / RePEc

Alan Stewart Duncan (born 13 January 1965) is a British economist and econometrician.

He is currently the Bankwest Professor of Economic Policy and Director of the Bankwest Curtin Economics Centre at Curtin University, Australia.

Duncan was awarded the Frisch Medal of the Econometric Society in 2000 for the article Estimating Labour Supply Responses using Tax Reforms (with Richard Blundell and Costas Meghir in Econometrica). He was head of the Nottingham School of Economics (University of Nottingham) from 2008 to 2010 and director of the National Centre for Social and Economic Modelling at the University of Canberra from March 2010 to January 2013.

Duncan graduated with a Bachelor of Arts in economics and econometrics from the University of Manchester in 1986 and obtained a DPhil in economics from the University of York in 1990. He held positions as lecturer and then reader in economics at the University of York from 1990 to 1999. Duncan was appointed professor of economics at the University of Nottingham in 2000. He held visiting positions at the Melbourne Institute of Applied Economic and Social Research and the University of Melbourne, where he was the 2002 RI Downing Research Fellow. Currently, he is an International Fellow at the Centre for Microdata Methods and Practice at University College London and Research Associate at the Institute for Fiscal Studies in London.

== Research ==
Duncan has worked on subjects ranging from labour economics, econometrics, public policy, and education to microeconomics.
