= Fisher–Schultz Lecture =

The Fisher–Schultz Lecture of the Econometric Society is an annual lecture given by a non-European member at the European meeting or, in Econometric Society World Congress years, at the World Congress. The lecture was named in honor of Irving Fisher and Henry Schultz.

- 2019 Victor Chernozhukov, Massachusetts Institute of Technology
- 2018 Matthew Gentzkow, Stanford University
- 2017 Janet Currie, Princeton University
- 2016 Mark Watson, Princeton University
- 2015 Darrell Duffie, Stanford University
- 2014 Randall Wright, University of Wisconsin-Madison
- 2013 Larry Samuelson, Yale University
- 2012 Stephen Morris, Princeton University
- 2011 Susan Athey, Harvard University
- 2010 Drew Fudenberg, Harvard University
- 2009 Faruk R. Gül, Princeton University
- 2008 Joel L. Horowitz, Northwestern University
- 2007 Matthew O. Jackson, Stanford University
- 2006 Lars Peter Hansen, University of Chicago
- 2005 Ariel Pakes, Harvard University
- 2004 Paul R. Milgrom, Stanford University
- 2003 Charles F. Manski, Northwestern University
- 2002 Douglas Gale, New York University
- 2001 Gary E. Chamberlain, Harvard University
- 2000 James J. Heckman, University of Chicago
- 1999 Alvin E. Roth, Harvard University
- 1998 David Card, University of California, Berkeley
- 1997 Bengt R. Holmström, Massachusetts Institute of Technology
- 1996 Robert F. Engle, University of California, San Diego
- 1995 George A. Akerlof, University of California, Berkeley
- 1994 Peter C. B. Phillips, Yale University
- 1993 Clive W. J. Granger, University of California, San Diego
- 1992 Robert H. Porter, Northwestern University
- 1991 Robert E. Lucas, Jr., University of Chicago
- 1990 David M. Kreps, Stanford University
- 1989 Angus S. Deaton, Princeton University
- 1988 Oliver Hart, Massachusetts Institute of Technology
- 1987 Joseph E. Stiglitz, Princeton University
- 1986 Robert B. Wilson, Stanford University
- 1985 Andreu Mas-Colell, Harvard University
- 1984 Hugo F. Sonnenschein, Princeton University
- 1983 Arnold Zellner, University of Chicago
- 1982 Jerry A. Hausman, Massachusetts Institute of Technology
- 1981 Peter A. Diamond, Massachusetts Institute of Technology
- 1980 Martin S. Feldstein, Harvard University
- 1979 Daniel L. McFadden, Massachusetts Institute of Technology
- 1978 Herbert E. Scarf, Yale University
- 1977 Christopher A. Sims, University of Minnesota
- 1976 John S. Chipman, University of Minnesota
- 1975 Dale W. Jorgenson, Harvard University
- 1974 Lionel W. McKenzie, University of Rochester
- 1973 Zvi Griliches, Harvard University
- 1972 Roy Radner, University of California, Berkeley
- 1971 Arthur Goldberger, University of Wisconsin, Madison
- 1970 Marc Nerlove, University of Chicago
- 1969 Gérard Debreu, University of California, Berkeley
- 1968 Franklin M. Fisher, Massachusetts Institute of Technology
- 1967 Lawrence R. Klein, University of Pennsylvania
- 1966 Tjalling C. Koopmans, Yale University
- 1965 Jacob Marschak, UCLA
- 1964 James Tobin, Yale University
- 1963 Leonid Hurwicz, University of Minnesota
- 1962 Robert M. Solow, Massachusetts Institute of Technology
