= Costas Meghir =

Greek-British economist

Academic background
- Education: University of Manchester
- Doctoral advisor: Richard Blundell

Konstantinos "Costas" Meghir (Greek: Κωνσταντίνος (Κώστας) Εκτώρ Δημήτριος Μεγήρ, transcr. Konstantinos Ektor Dimitrios Meghir, born February 13, 1959) is a Greek-British economist. He studied at the University of Manchester where he graduated with a Ph.D. in 1985, following an MA in economics (with Distinction) in 1980 and a BA (with Honors) in Economics and Econometrics in 1979. In 1997 he was awarded the Bodosakis foundation prize and in 2000 he was awarded the “Ragnar Frisch Medal” for his article “Estimating Labour Supply Responses using Tax Reforms” (Econometrica, 1998, Vol. 66, No. 4, with Richard Blundell and Alan Duncan).

Following his Ph.D. he was appointed at University College London, where he was promoted to professor in 1993 and was head of the department of economics from 2005-2008. He has been at Yale University since 2010, where he is the “Douglas A. Warner III” Professor of Economics. He is also a research associate of the NBER, a research fellow of the Institute for Fiscal Studies (IFS) in the UK, a Fellow of the British Academy (FBA), a Fellow of the Econometric Society, a Fellow of the European Economic Association and a Fellow of the Society for Labor Economists. He holds affiliations with IZA and the CEPR. In 2019 he was elected member of the American Academy of Arts and Sciences.

He has been co-editor of Econometrica (2001-2006), joint managing editor of the Economic Journal (1996-2001) and Assistant Editor at the Review of Economics Studies (1990-1994). He is currently editing Economics Letters.

== Research ==
His main research interests are in Labor economics, Human Capital, the Economics of the Household and the design of tax and welfare programs. He has been involved in the evaluation of numerous public policy programs in the UK and developing countries, including Colombia, Chile and Senegal.

Recently he has been working in the field of child development. He has been involved in designing scalable Early Childhood interventions based on both home visiting and village playgroups in deprived communities. These have been implemented in Colombia and India (Odisha), and evaluated by Randomised Control Trials (RCTs).

== Publications ==
Meghir has over 136 articles on subjects ranging from Labor Economics, Education, Child development, Impact evaluation, Advanced Econometrics, Economics of Education, etc.
