= John Van Reenen (economist) =

English economist

- Born: 26 December 1965 (age 60)

Academic background
- Education: Queens' College, Cambridge (BA); London School of Economics (MSc); University College London (PhD)
- Doctoral advisor: Stephen Machin; Richard Blundell

Academic work
- Discipline: Labour economics Industrial organisation
- Institutions: London School of Economics
- Doctoral students: Nicholas Bloom
- Awards: Yrjö Jahnsson Award (2009)

Special Adviser to the Chancellor of the Exchequer
- In office 2024–2026
- Prime Minister: Keir Starmer
- Chancellor: Rachel Reeves

Chair of the Council of Economic Advisers
- In office 2024–2026
- Prime Minister: Keir Starmer
- Chancellor: Rachel Reeves
- Website: Information at IDEAS / RePEc

John Michael Van Reenen OBE (born 26 December 1965) is the Ronald Coase School Professor at the London School of Economics. He is also Director of the Programme On Innovation and Diffusion (POID) at the Centre for Economic Performance. He was appointed an Officer of the Order of the British Empire (OBE) and received the Yrjö Jahnsson Award. He was appointed as Chair of the Council of Economic Advisors to the UK Chancellor of the Exchequer, Rachel Reeves, on 5 July 2024.

== Background ==
He is the son of Lionel Van Reenen, formerly a sociologist at Goldsmiths College in the University of London and an immigrant from South Africa. His mother is Anne Van Reenen. He is married to Sarah Chambers, an interior designer and has a daughter, Charlotte.

Van Reenen attended Queens' College, Cambridge, where he graduated with a BA in economics and social and political sciences; he won the Joshua King, the Subject, and the College Prizes. He took a Master's at the London School of Economics, graduating with Distinction and winning the Automation Prize. He completed his PhD at University College London (UCL) and began his career in 1992 at the Institute for Fiscal Studies, where he founded the 'Productivity and Innovation' programme. He has been a full professor at UCL and a visiting professor at University of California, Berkeley, Stanford Business School, Harvard University and Princeton University. From October 2003 to July 2016, he was a professor in the Department of Economics and director of the Centre for Economic Performance at the London School of Economics. In July 2016, he became a professor of economics at MIT. In 2020 he returned to LSE to become the Ronald Coase School Professor.

In 2000–01 he was a senior advisor to the Secretary of State for Health, Alan Milburn, and helped write the NHS Plan 2000. He has also been a senior advisor at 10 Downing Street. From 2001 to 2002 he was a partner of an economic consultancy firm, Lexecon, now part of Charles River Associates, and was also involved in the software start-up Polygnostics. In 2013 he published a report and book, Investing for Prosperity, written with Tim Besley, which summarised the work of the LSE Growth Commission. This recommended policies for long-run sustainable growth in the UK economy.

His research focuses on the causes and consequences of innovation. His early work focused on the impact of technology on wages, inequality, jobs, and firm profits. A characteristic of his approach is a focus on empirical evidence of large-scale datasets and an emphasis on public policy. More recently, he has worked on the measurement of management practices and their impact on productivity across firms and countries with his former PhD students Nicholas Bloom and Raffaella Sadun. He has published over 100 peer-reviewed articles in the economics of innovation, productivity, labour economics, industrial economics, and econometrics. He is frequently reported in the media in the UK and overseas. He is currently on the editorial board of Quantitative Economics and Management Science. Previously, he has served on the Editorial Board of the Journal of Industrial Economics, Journal of Economic Literature and Review of Economic Studies. He is a member of the Council of the Royal Economic Society. He is a fellow of the Econometric Society and British Academy, as well as a research fellow at the National Bureau of Economic Research, Centre for Economic Policy Research and Institute for the Study of Labor.

Van Reenen was appointed Officer of the Order of the British Empire (OBE) in the 2016 New Year Honours for services to economics and public policy making. In 2009, he was awarded (jointly with Fabrizio Zilibotti) the Yrjö Jahnsson Award. This is the European equivalent of the John Bates Clark Medal. It is awarded by the European Economic Association to the best economist in Europe under the age of 45. In 2011 he was awarded the Arrow Prize for the best paper in the field of health economics.

John Van Reenen was both the Professor of Applied Economics at MIT Sloan School of Management and in the Department of Economics.
