= Kate Ho =

American economist (1972–2025)

- Born: Katherine Slack; 1972; York, England
- Died: 8 December 2025 (aged 53); New York, U.S.
- Citizenship: British, American

Academic background
- Education: Cambridge University; Harvard University
- Doctoral advisor: Ariel Pakes

Academic work
- Discipline: Economics
- Sub-discipline: Health Economics; Industrial Organization
- Institutions: Columbia University; Princeton University

Katherine Ho (née Slack; 1972 – 8 December 2025) was a British-American economist who was the John L. Weinberg Professor of Economics and Business Policy at Princeton University. Her research focused on the industrial organization of the medical care market.

== Education ==
Ho obtained a Bachelor of Arts (B.A.) and Master of Arts (M.A.) in Mathematics from Cambridge University in June 1993. and a Ph.D. in Business Economics from Harvard University in 2005.

== Career ==
Before starting her career in academia, Ho served as a Chief of Staff to the Minister of State for Health, for the UK Government Department of Health. She then worked at McKinsey & Company, Inc, for two years before beginning her graduate studies. She joined Columbia University's Department of Economics as an assistant professor in 2005 and was tenured in 2013. She moved to Princeton University in 2018.

At her death, Ho was a co-editor at Econometrica. She was previously an editor at the RAND Journal of Economics and a co-editor at the American Economic Journal: Economic Policy. From 2018 to 2024, she was co-director (with Janet Currie) of Princeton's Center for Health and Wellbeing.

== Death ==
Ho died from cancer in New York on 8 December 2025, at the age of 53.

== Awards and recognition ==
Ho was an elected fellow of the Econometric Society and a research associate at the National Bureau of Economic Research (NBER). She gave the Fisher-Schultz Lecture of the Econometric Society in Copenhagen in 2021.

In 2006, Ho received the Richard Stone Prize in Applied Econometrics for her paper, "The Welfare Effects of Restricted Hospital Choice in the US Medical Care Market". Her paper “Insurer-Provider Networks in the Medical Care Market” received the Arrow Award for Best Health Economics Paper in 2010 from the International Health Economics Association (iHEA). In 2020, Kate Ho and Robin Lee won the Frisch Medal from the Econometric Society for their paper "Insurer Competition in Health Care Markets”.

== Selected publications ==
- Dickstein, Mike, Ho, Kate and Nathan Mark. 2023. "Market Segmentation and Competition in Health Insurance." Journal of Political Economy.
- Ho, Kate, Robin S. Lee. 2019. "Equilibrium Provider Networks: Bargaining and Exclusion in Health Care Markets." American Economic Review.
- Dafny, Leemore, Kate Ho, and Robin S. Lee. 2019. "The Price Effects of cross‐market Mergers: Theory and Evidence from the Hospital Industry." The RAND Journal of Economics 50 (2): 286-325.
- Ho, Kate, Robin S. Lee. 2017. "Insurer Competition in Health Care Markets." Econometrica.
- Ho, Kate, Hogan, Joe, and Fiona Scott Morton. 2017. "The Impact of Consumer Inattention on Insurer Pricing in Medicare Part D". RAND Journal of Economics.
- Gaynor, Martin, Kate Ho, Robert Town. 2015. "The Industrial Organization of Health Care Markets". Journal of Economic Literature.
- Pakes, Ariel, Porter, Jack, Ho, Kate and Joy Ishii. 2015. "Moment Inequalities and Their Application." Econometrica.
- Ho, Kate, Ariel Pakes. 2015. "Hospital Choices, Hospital Prices and Financial Incentives to Physicians". American Economic Review.
- Ho, Justin, Kate Ho, Julie Holland Mortimer. 2012. "Analyzing the Welfare Impacts of Full-Line Forcing Contracts". American Economic Review.
- Ho, Kate. 2009. "Insurer-Provider Networks in the Medical Care Market." American Economic Review.
- Ho, Kate. 2006. "The Welfare Effects of Restricted Hospital Choice in the U.S. Medical Care Market." Journal of Applied Econometrics.
