= Pakes =

Pakes is a surname. Notable people with the surname include:

- Andrew Pakes (born 1973), British politician
- Ariel Pakes (born 1949), American-Canadian economist
