= El-Beltagi =

El-Beltagi or El-Beltagy (Arabic: البلتاجي, romanized: al-Baltājī or al-Biltājī) is an Egyptian surname. Notable people with the surname include:

- Fatima Ibrahim es-Sayyid el-Beltagi (1904–1975), known as Umm Kulthum, Egyptian singer and actress
- Mohamed Elbeltagy (born 1963), Egyptian physician, academic and politician

== See also ==
- Aqel Biltaji (1941–2021), Jordanian-Palestinian politician
- Badi Baltagi (born 1954), Lebanese-American economist
- Baltadji, the palace guard profession that originated the name
- Baltacı
