= Generosity =

Liberality in giving

Generosity (also called largesse) is the virtue of being liberal in giving, often as gifts. Generosity is regarded as a virtue by various world religions and philosophies and is often celebrated in cultural and religious ceremonies.

Scientific investigation into generosity has examined the effect of a number of scenarios and games on individuals' generosity, potential links with neurochemicals such as oxytocin, and generosity's relationship with similar feelings such as empathy.

== Other uses ==
The most generous of people is the one who gives to those from whom he has no hope of return.

— Husain ibn Ali

Generosity often encompasses acts of charity, in which people give without expecting anything in return. This can involve offering time, assets, or talents to assist those in need, such as during natural disasters, where people voluntarily contribute resources, goods, and money. The impact of generosity is most profound when it arises spontaneously rather than being directed by an organization. People can experience joy and love when they positively affect someone's life through acts of generosity.

Generosity is a guiding principle for many registered charities, foundations, non-profit organizations, etc.

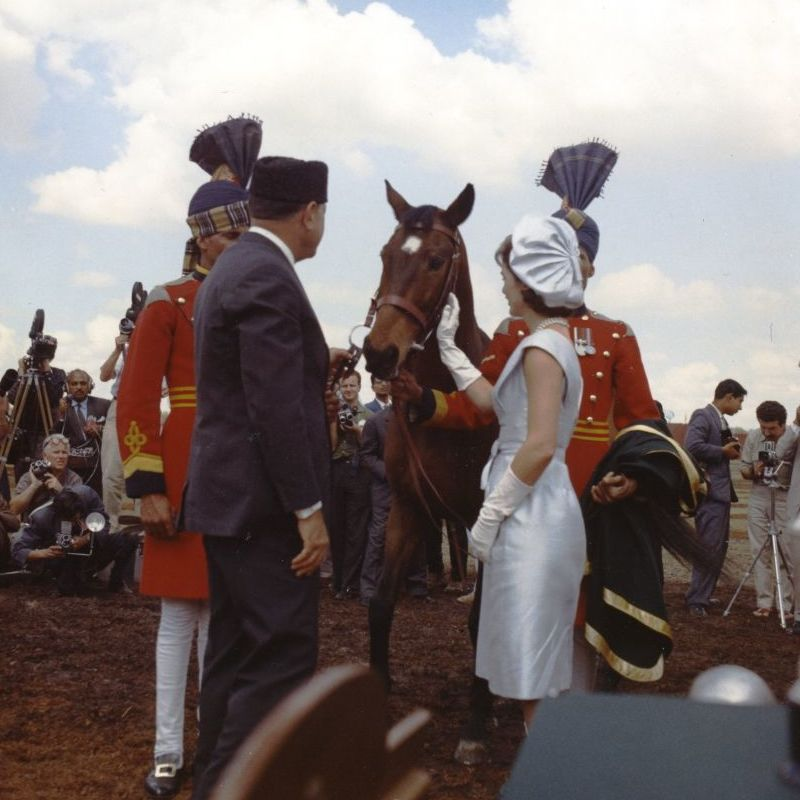
Mohammed Ayub Khan, the second president of Pakistan presenting Jackie Kennedy a gelding, 1962

== Etymology ==
The modern English word generosity derives from the Latin word generōsus, which means "of noble birth", which itself was passed down to English through the Old French word généreux. The Latin stem gener– is the declensional stem of genus, meaning "kin", "clan", "race", or "stock", with the root Indo-European meaning of gen being "to beget". The same root gives the words genesis, gentry, gender, genital, gentile, genealogy, and genius, among others.

Over the last five centuries in the English-speaking world, generosity has developed from being primarily the description of an ascribed status pertaining to the elite nobility to being an achieved mark of admirable personal quality and action capable of being exercised in theory by any person who had learned virtue and noble character.

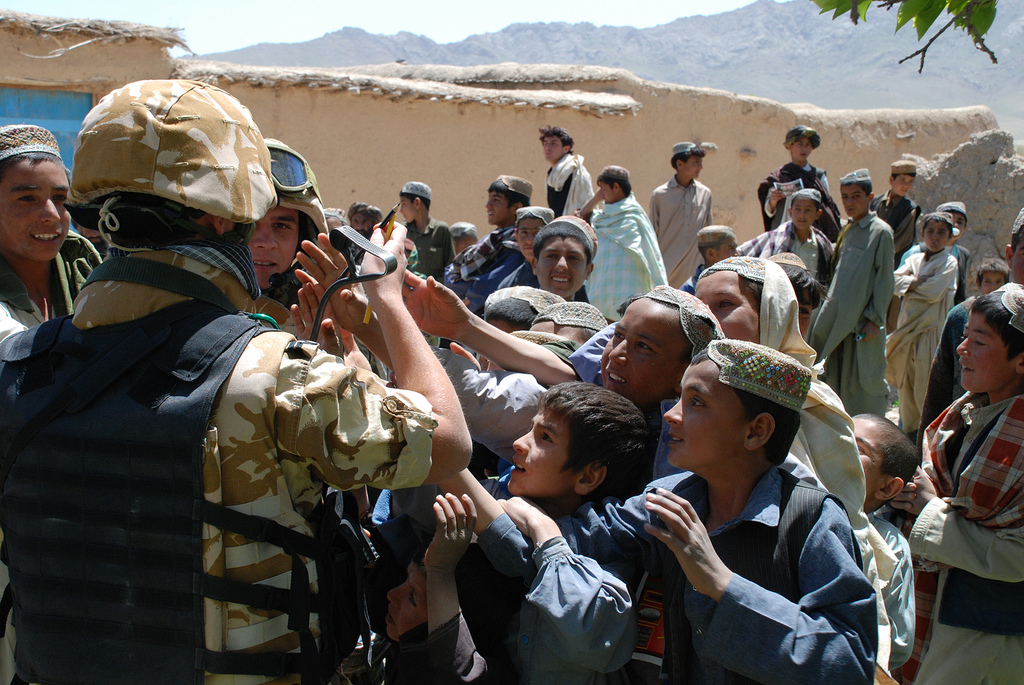
Members of the Romanian Army sharing gifts with children in Afghanistan, 2009

Most recorded English uses of the word generous up to and during the sixteenth century reflect an aristocratic sense of being of noble lineage or high birth. Being generous was literally a way of complying with nobility.

During the 17th century, the meaning and use of the word began to change. Generosity came increasingly to identify not literal family heritage but a nobility of spirit thought to be associated with high birth—that is, with various admirable qualities that could now vary from person to person, depending not on family history but on personal character. Generosity came to signify gallantry, courage, strength, richness, gentleness, and fairness. In addition, generous became used to describe fertile land, the strength of animal breeds, abundant provisions of food, the vibrancy of colors, the strength of liquor, and the potency of medicine.

During the 18th century, the meaning of generosity continued to evolve to denote the more specific, contemporary meaning of munificence, open-handedness, and liberality in the giving of money and possessions to others. This more specific meaning came to dominate English usage by the 19th century.

== In religion ==
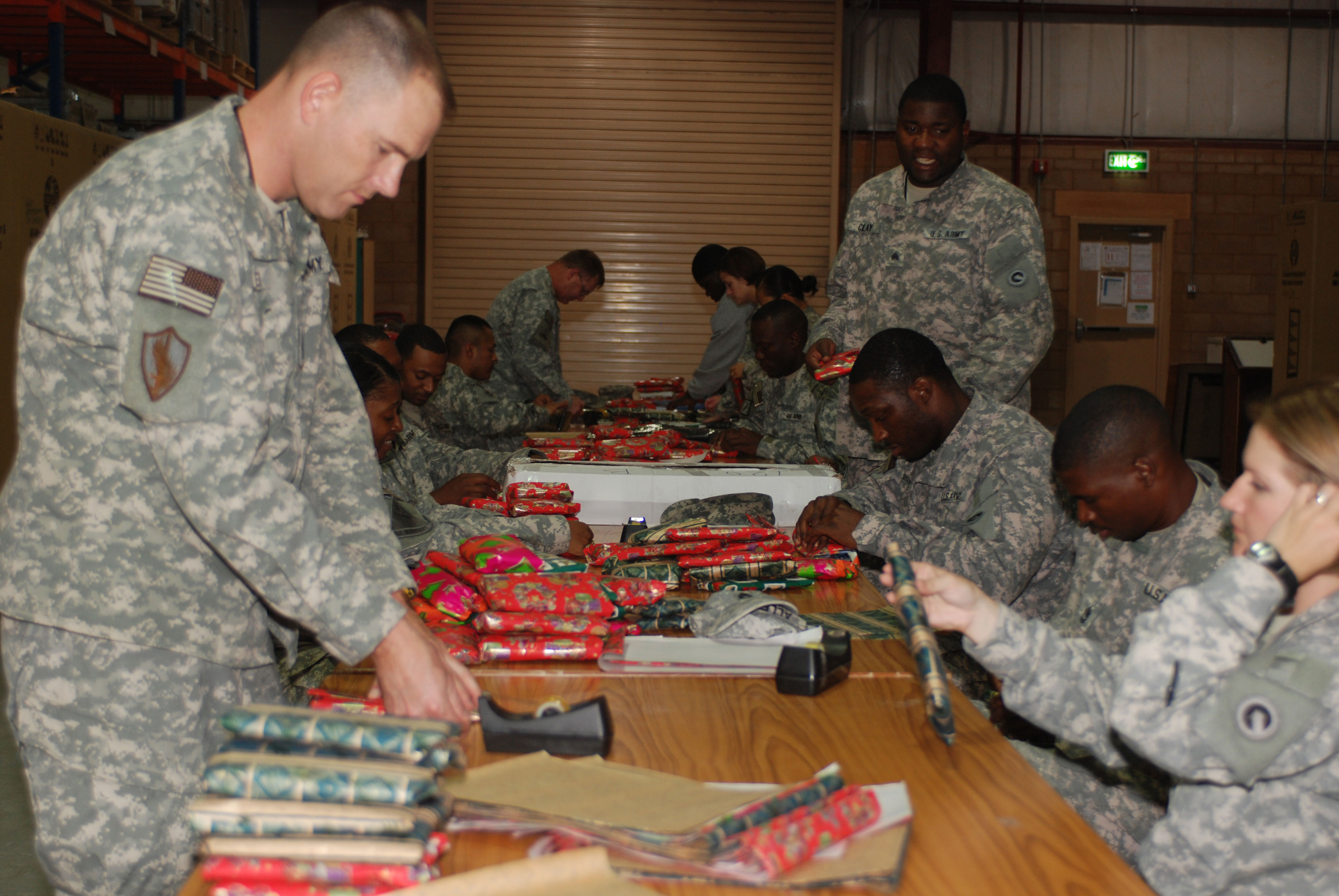
Members of the US Army 1st Sustainment Command wrap Christmas gifts for soldiers stationed in or passing through Kuwait, 2008

In Buddhism, generosity is one of the Ten Perfections and is the antidote to the self-chosen poison called greed. Generosity is known as dāna in the Eastern religious scriptures.

In Islam, the Quran states that whatever one gives away generously, with the intention of pleasing God, He will replace. God knows what is in the hearts of men. Say: "Truly, my Lord enlarges the provision for whom He wills of His slaves, and also restricts it for him, and whatever you spend of anything (in God's Cause), He will replace it. And He is the Best of providers."^{[Quran 34:39]}

In Christianity, in the Acts of the Apostles, Paul reports that Jesus said that giving is better than receiving, although the gospels do not record this as a saying of Jesus. In his first letter to Timothy, Paul tells rich Christians that they must be "generous and willing to share", and in his second letter to the Corinthians he states that "God loves a cheerful giver". Later Christian tradition further developed the concept of the virtue of charity.

== In philosophy ==
Immanuel Kant also contemplates generosity in a universal and uninterested form in his categorical imperative.

== Research and scholarship ==
Research associates generosity with empathy. Paul J. Zak and colleagues administered the peptide oxytocin or placebo was given to about 100 men who then they made several decisions regarding money. One scenario, the Dictator Game, was used to measure altruism by asking people to make a unilateral transfer of $10 they were given by the experimenters to a stranger in the lab; oxytocin had no effect on altruism. Another task, the Ultimatum Game, was used to measure generosity. In this game, one person was endowed with $10 and was asked to offer some split of it to another person in the lab, via computer. If the second person did not like the split, he could reject it (for example, if it was stingy) and both people would get zero. In a clever twist, the researchers told participants they would be randomly chosen to be either the person making the offer or the person responding to it. This required the person making the offer to take the other's perspective explicitly. Generosity was defined as an offer greater than the minimum amount needed for acceptance. Oxytocin increased generosity 80% compared to those on placebo. In addition, oxytocin was quantitatively twice as important in predicting generosity as was altruism.

Research indicates that higher-income individuals are less generous than poorer individuals, and that a perceived higher economic inequality leads higher-income individuals to be less generous.

The science of generosity initiative at the University of Notre Dame investigates the sources, origins, and causes of generosity; manifestations and expressions of generosity; and consequences of generosity for givers and receivers. Generosity for the purposes of this project is defined as the virtue of giving good things to others empathically and abundantly.

The impact of external circumstances on generosity was explored by Milan Tsverkova and Michael W. Macy. Generosity exhibited a form of social contagion, influencing people's willingness to be generous. The study examined two methods of spreading generosity behavior: generalized reciprocity and the influence of observing others' generous actions. The findings indicate that these methods increase the frequency of generous behaviors. However, a bystander effect can also arise, leading to a decrease in the frequency of such behaviors.

Peer punishment influences cooperation in human groups. In one set of laboratory experiments, participant roles included punishers, non-punishers, and generous and selfish people. Generous people were considered more trustworthy by participants than selfish people, and punishers were considered less trustworthy than non-punishers.

== See also ==
- Altruism – Concern for the well-being of others
- Ambitus – Political corruption crime in ancient Roman law
- Categorical imperative – Central concept in Kantian moral philosophy
- Dāna – Concept of charity in Indian religions
- Kindness – Type of behaviour
- Largitio – Political corruption crime in ancient Roman law
- Magnanimity – Virtue of being great of mind and heart
- Philanthropy – Private efforts to increase public good
- Selfishness – Concern for self above that of others
- Selfless service – Selfless service and volunteering in Indian religions
