= Rachel McCulloch =

American economist

- Born: June, 1942
- Died: June 18, 2016
- Citizenship: United States
- Education: University of Pennsylvania; University of Chicago
- Spouse: Gary Chamberlain
- Children: 2
- Awards: Carolyn Shaw Bell Award, 2013
- Scientific career
- Fields: Economics
- Workplaces: University of Chicago; Harvard University; University of Wisconsin-Madison; Brandeis University
- Website: http://people.brandeis.edu/~rmccullo/

Rachel McCulloch (June, 1942 - June 18, 2016) was an economist and the Rosen Family Professor of International Finance in the Department of Economics and International Business School at Brandeis University. She was a leading figure in the field of international trade, with over 100 published papers, served as a consultant to the World Bank and Asian Development Bank, and was a member of the Presidential Commission on Industrial Competitiveness. She also served on the board of directors of the International Trade and Finance Association and on the executive committee of the American Economic Association. She was the 2013 winner of the Carolyn Shaw Bell Award from the Committee on the Status of Women in the Economics Profession, given annually "to an individual who has furthered the status of women in the economics profession."
