= Samuel Kortum =

American economist

- Born: December 1960 (age 65)
- Occupation: James Burrows Moffatt Professor of Economics

Academic background
- Education: Wesleyan University; Yale University
- Thesis: Inventions, R&D and Industry Growth
- Doctoral advisor: Ariel Pakes

Academic work
- Discipline: Economics
- Sub-discipline: International trade, industrial organization
- Institutions: Boston University; University of Minnesota; University of Chicago; Yale University

Samuel S. Kortum (born December 1960) is an American economist and currently James Burrows Moffatt Professor of Economics at Yale University. His research focuses on international trade and industrial organisation.

== Education ==
Kortum graduated with a BA from Wesleyan University in 1983. He went on to further study at Yale University and received his Ph.D. in economics in 1992.

== Career ==
Kortum's first academic position was as an assistant professor at Boston University. He left for an associate professorship at the University of Minnesota in 2001 and was promoted to full professor in 2004. From 2006 to 2012 he was a professor at the University of Chicago, followed by an appointment at his current institution, Yale University, in 2012. He was made James Burrows Moffatt Professor in 2015.

He has served various academic journals in an editorial capacity, such as the European Economic Review and the Journal of Political Economy.

The Econometric Society and the American Academy of Arts and Sciences elected him fellow in 2011 and 2016, respectively. The former awarded him the Frisch Medal in 2004.
