= Nicholas Bloom =

British economist

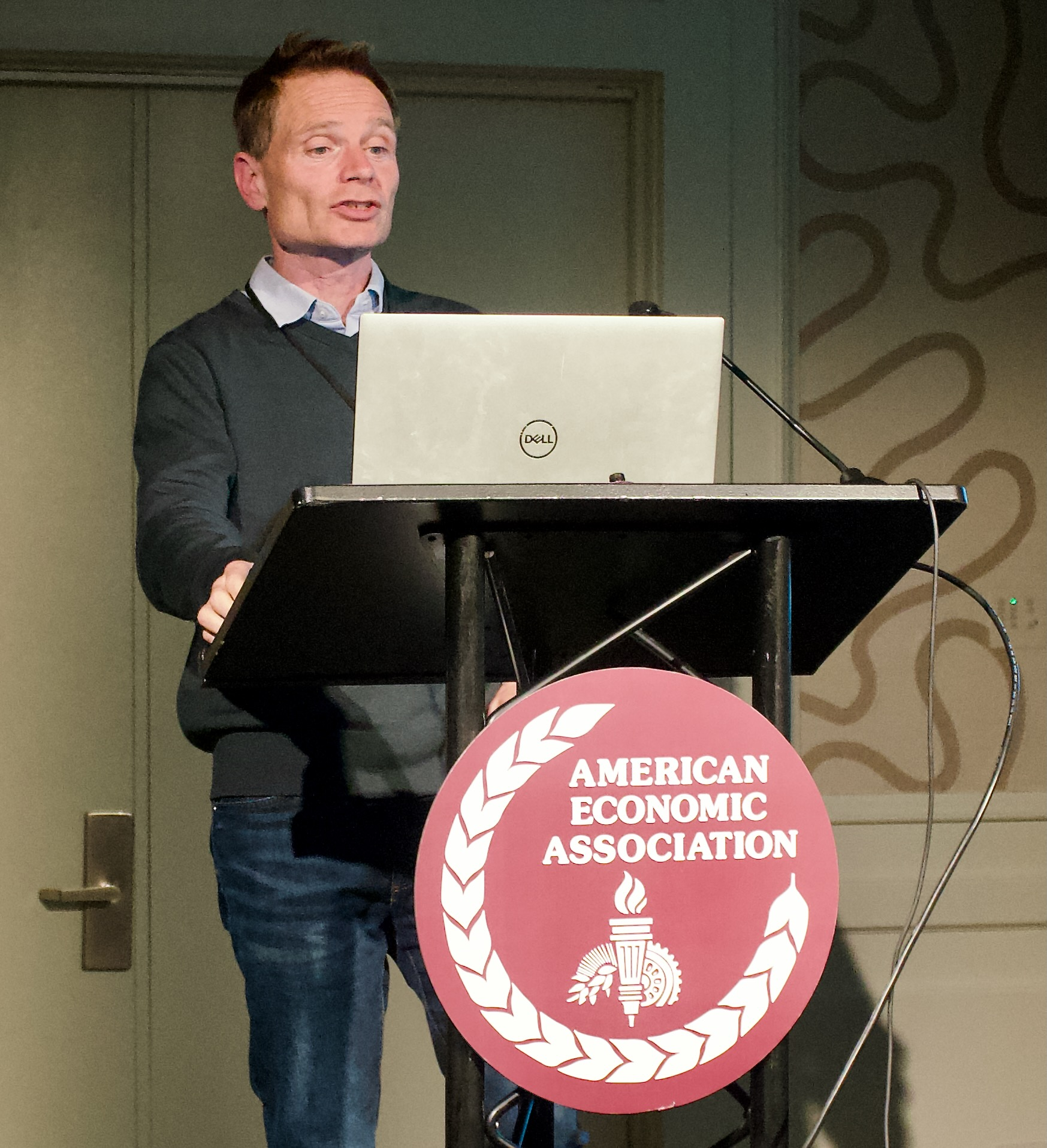
- Born: Nicholas Alexander Bloom; 5 May 1973 (age 53)

Academic background
- Education: University of Cambridge (BA); University of Oxford (MPhil); University College London (PhD)
- Doctoral advisor: John Van Reenen; Richard Blundell

Academic work
- Discipline: Labor economics Macroeconomics
- Institutions: Stanford University
- Awards: Bloomberg 50 (2022); Guggenheim Fellowship (2020); Germán Bernácer Prize (2012); Frisch Medal (2010); National Science Foundation CAREER Award (2009); Sloan Fellowship (2008)
- Website: profiles.stanford.edu/nicholas-bloom

Nicholas Alexander Bloom (born 5 May 1973) is the William Eberle Professor in the Department of Economics at Stanford University, a courtesy professor at Stanford Business School and Stanford Institute for Economic Policy Research, and a co-director of the Productivity, Innovation and Entrepreneurship Program at the National Bureau of Economic Research.

He is a Fellow of the American Academy of Arts and Sciences and the Econometric Society, and the recipient of the Frisch Medal in 2010, the Bernacer Prize in 2012, the Center for Economic Studies Distinguished Fellow award in 2020, the Guggenheim Fellowship in 2022 and the 50 Most Influential (Bloomberg ranking) in 2022.

His research focuses on the measurement and impact of uncertainty on investment, employment and growth. He also works on the measurement of management practices and productivity with Raffaella Sadun and John Van Reenen, on working from home, and on innovation. He co-founded research websites on policy uncertainty, global uncertainty, UK uncertainty, management and working from home.

== Education and Career ==
Bloom was educated at the University of Oxford and the University of Cambridge. He completed a PhD at University College London in 2001 under the supervision of John Van Reenen and Richard Blundell.

From 1996 to 2002 he worked at the Institute for Fiscal Studies and on business tax policy at HM Treasury. From 2002 to 2003 he worked at McKinsey & Company, and in 2003 he moved to the Centre for Economic Performance at the London School of Economics, and to Stanford University in 2005.

He spoke on working from home at the 2014 White House Working Families Summit alongside Business Leaders, Trade Unionists, President Obama and Vice President Biden, and at Tedx Stanford in 2017. His research on remote work has been cited and discussed in The New York Times, The Wall Street Journal and Freakonomics Radio.

== Career and research ==
Bloom has been behind the modern measurement of management quality, and emphasizing it as important in explaining differences in productivity between countries. In 2007, Bloom, with his frequent co-authors John Van Reenen and Raffaella Sadun, created a massive survey dataset on management quality across firms. They would subsequently be responsible for the creation of the Management and Organizational Practices Survey by the U.S. Census Bureau, which has been an invaluable resource for fellow economists.

Bloom has directly tested the impact of management interventions in the developing world. In "Does Management Matter?" he (with Eifert, Mahajan, McKenzie, and Roberts) tested a randomized controlled trial introducing better management practices to Indian textile firms. The interventions raised profitability by 17% per year, or an average of $300,000 per firm. The gains were persistent, and the firms had higher returns over 8 years later. Other work by him on management has shown how multinationals bring their culture with them, how multinationals are quicker to adopt new technology, how competition improves management quality in public hospitals and in schools, and how the business environment, plus other entrants into the same area, improve the management of firms. He consistently finds that management quality, and thus total factor productivity, is affected by competition. Managers are not always maximizing the profits of their firm, but rather their own utility. It suggests that trade barriers have a negative welfare impact beyond the standard deadweight loss, and even beyond the reallocation of employment between firms – it also leaves firms enervated, inefficient, and less innovative.

Bloom has contributed to our understanding of technological innovation. In "Competition and Innovation: An Inverted U Relationship" he (with Aghion, Blundell, Griffith, and Howitt) shows how both too much, and too little, competition stifle the rate of technological development. With too little competition, the firm is collecting monopoly rents, and so fears any substantial shakeup. With too much competition, firms cannot make the fixed costs necessary for research. Innovation is maximized somewhere in between the two extremes.

It is not necessarily obvious which firms are in competition with each other. Bloom has made fundamental contributions to identifying how different firms interact with each, by extending the work of Jaffe (1986) (which uses the correlation of firm patents in different technology classes to measure how close firms are in "space") to the product market as well. He, Mark Schankerman, and Van Reenen use this, as well as changes in tax policy to eliminate similar businesses facing similar shocks, to quantify whether the positive spillovers of spreading knowledge outweigh the negative spillovers of stealing business from rivals. They find that the positive spillovers are predominant, that a firm inventing a technology makes its competitors more profitable and productive, and that the social returns to research and development are twice as high as the private returns. This ties in with Chad Jones and John C. Williams (1998), who estimate that the optimal rate of R&D spending is two to four times larger than it actually is.

Bloom would go on to work with Chad Jones, as well as Van Reenen and Michael Webb, to see if ideas are becoming harder to find. This is of importance for our understanding of growth – if there are decreasing returns to innovation, then in the long run how much we can grow is capped by population growth. They find that, while the rate of technological discovery has been smooth, this has come only from dedicating more and more resources to research. Measured researcher productivity, across many different domains, has consistently fallen over time.

Since research is insufficiently produced, governments frequently subsidize it. Bloom, Rachel Griffith, and Van Reenen found that tax incentives do increase research intensity, with research rising by more in the long-run as firms adjust to the change. Later work cautions against direct subsidies to incumbents, however, as it discourages the exit of less productive firms. Paradoxically, taxing incumbent firms could increase welfare. Analogously, Bloom, Mirko Draca, and Van Reenen found that the surge in Chinese import competition led to technical progress within firms, and reallocated labor to the most technologically advanced firms. This is in line with the predictions of the Melitz-Ottoviano model – simultaneous increases in market size, and in the rigor of competition, benefit those firms with the lowest marginal costs of production. Because of his work, Bloom favors boosting the supply of skilled laborers, whether through supporting education or through expanded immigration.

Bloom has numerous papers focused on uncertainty, including his doctoral work which won the Frisch Medal in 2010. He defines uncertainty as when firms are less able to forecast the future accurately. Proxies like stock market volatility capture this because the present stock market price is equivalent to the expected discounted returns of the asset, and so price changes occur when people collectively misassed the price of assets. With Scott Baker and Steven Davis, he created a newspaper based index of economic policy uncertainty, which has been widely used by later authors. He has studied how uncertainty can exacerbate business cycles, reduce investment, and prevent reallocation.

Bloom has been one of the leading voices on remote work, starting long before the Covid pandemic brought it to prominence. In "Does Working From Home Work?", he (with James Liang, John Roberts, and Zhichun Jenny Ying) found in 2015 that call center employees experienced substantially raised productivity from working from home, even when employees could select whether or not they participated in it. In a later study, he, Liang, and Ruobing Han ran a randomized controlled trial on hybrid work for professional workers, finding it did not damage performance, but did reduce the rate of turnover.
