= Larry G. Epstein =

Canadian economist

Academic background
- Education: University of Manitoba (BA 1968) Hebrew University of Jerusalem (MA 1970) University of British Columbia (PhD 1977)

Academic work
- Discipline: Mathematical economics, Decision theory, Asset pricing
- Institutions: Boston University (2007–present); University of Rochester (1998–2007); University of Toronto (1977–1998)
- Doctoral students: Shouyong Shi; Takashi Hayashi
- Website: Information at IDEAS / RePEc

Larry G. Epstein is a Canadian economist who is currently Professor of Economics at McGill University. He is a Fellow of the Canadian Economics Association and Econometric Society. He was also Fellow of the Royal Society of Canada before moving to the United States.

== Biography ==
Larry G. Epstein obtained his BSc in mathematics with honours from the University of Manitoba in 1968, MA in mathematics from the Hebrew University of Jerusalem in 1970 and PhD in economics from the University of British Columbia in 1977. He worked as a research economist at the Department of Manpower and Immigration of Canada from 1971 to 1974 before joining the University of Toronto, where he was assistant professor from 1977 to 1980 and Professor from 1983 to 1998. Epstein moved to University of Rochester in 1998 and held the position of Elmer B. Milliman Professor of Economics until 2007. He started his current position as Professor of Economics at Boston University in 2007. Epstein has also served on the Executive Council of the Canadian Economic Association from 1987 to 1990 and has been a member of the American Academy of Arts and Sciences since 2013.

Epstein's main research areas cover topics in mathematical economics, decision theory and asset pricing. In addition to his research work, he has also held editorial positions with numerous journals such as Econometrica, Journal of Economic Theory and Macroeconomic Dynamics.

He received the Canadian Economic Association's John Rae Award for outstanding research in 1994 and was awarded the Econometric Society's Frisch Medal the same year.

== Selected publications ==
- Epstein, L. G. & S. E. Zin (1989). "Substitution, risk aversion, and the temporal behavior of consumption and asset returns: A theoretical framework". Econometrica, 7 (1), pp. 937–969.
- Epstein, L. G. & S. E. Zin (1991). "Substitution, risk aversion, and the temporal behavior of consumption and asset returns: An empirical analysis". Journal of Political Economy. 99 (2), pp. 263–286.
- Duffie, D. & L. G. Epstein (1992) "Stochastic differential utility". Econometrica, 3 (1), pp. 353–394.
- Chen, Z. & L. Epstein (2002) "Ambiguity, risk, and asset returns in continuous time". Econometrica, 70 (4), pp. 1403–1443.
- Epstein, L. G. & M. Schneider (2003) "Recursive multiple-priors". Journal of Economic Theory, 113 (1), pp. 1–31.
- Epstein, L. G. & M. Schneider (2008) "Ambiguity, information quality, and asset pricing". The Journal of Finance, 63 (1), pp. 197–228.
