= Steven T. Berry =

American economist

Academic background
- Education: Northwestern University (BA); University of Wisconsin–Madison (MS, PhD)
- Doctoral advisor: Ariel Pakes

Academic work
- Discipline: Industrial organization Econometrics
- Institutions: Yale University
- Awards: Frisch Medal (1996)
- Website: economics.yale.edu/people/steven-berry

Steven Titus Berry (born 1959) is an American economist and the Sterling Professor of Economics at Yale University. His research is in industrial organization and econometrics, particularly the empirical analysis of differentiated-product markets. He is known for developing the Berry–Levinsohn–Pakes model of demand with James Levinsohn and Ariel Pakes.

== Education and career ==
Berry received a B.A. from Northwestern University in 1980 and an M.S. and Ph.D. from the University of Wisconsin–Madison in 1985 and 1989, respectively. His doctoral adviser was Ariel Pakes.

Berry joined the Yale faculty in 1988. He was appointed the inaugural David Swensen Professor of Economics in 2014 and became Sterling Professor of Economics in 2025. He has also served as chair of Yale's Department of Economics and as director of the Division of Social Sciences. He is the inaugural faculty director of Yale's Tobin Center for Economic Policy.

== Research ==
Berry's research focuses on empirical industrial organization, including product differentiation, equilibrium pricing, firm entry, and the analysis of markets such as automobiles, airlines, and media.

With James Levinsohn and Ariel Pakes, Berry developed an approach to estimating demand and supply in differentiated-product markets that became known as the Berry–Levinsohn–Pakes, or BLP, model. Their 1995 Econometrica article, "Automobile Prices in Market Equilibrium", applied the method to the U.S. automobile industry. Yale has described the BLP model as one of Berry's most significant contributions to industrial organization.

Berry's earlier work on entry in the airline industry was published in Econometrica in 1992 and received the Frisch Medal in 1996.

== Honors ==
Berry is a fellow of the Econometric Society and a recipient of its Frisch Medal. He was elected to the American Academy of Arts and Sciences in 2014 and was named the Industrial Organization Society's Distinguished Fellow in 2017. In 2025, he was elected to the National Academy of Sciences.
