= Joel Horowitz =

Joel Horowitz is the Charles E. and Emma H. Morrison Professor of Economics at Northwestern University (US). The focus of his research has been on estimation and inference where knowledge of data generating process is rather weak, on inference where sample sizes are limited and to improve estimation and inference by the use of economic theory informed restrictions. He is also a Fellow of both the Econometric Society and of the American Statistical Association.

The Econometrics Journal celebrated Horowitz's work and contributions to many areas of econometrics and statistics. They specifically listed bootstrap methods, semi-parametric and non-parametric estimation, specification testing, non-parametric instrumental variables, estimation of high-dimensional models, and functional data analysis. (Chen et al. 2014)

He served as Co-Editor of two of the leading econometrics journals

- Econometrica 2000- 2004
- Econometric Theory 1992–2000.

== Selected publications ==
- Horowitz, Joel (2009) Semiparametric and Nonparametric Methods in Econometrics, Springer-Verlag
- Horowitz, J. L. (2001). The bootstrap. In Handbook of econometrics (Vol. 5, pp. 3159-3228). Elsevier.
- Horowitz, Joel (1998) Semiparametric Methods in Econometrics, Springer-Verlag
- Forsythe, R., Horowitz, J. L., Savin, N. E., & Sefton, M. (1994). Fairness in simple bargaining experiments. Games and Economic behavior, 6(3), 347–369.
