= Victor Chernozhukov =

Russian American statistician and economist

Victor Chernozhukov (Виктор Викторович Черножуков) is a Russian-American statistician and economist currently at Massachusetts Institute of Technology. His current research focuses on mathematical statistics and machine learning for causal structural models in high-dimensional environments. He graduated from the University of Illinois at Urbana-Champaign with a master's in statistics in 1997 and received his PhD in economics from Stanford University in 2000.

He is a recipient of the Alfred P. Sloan Research and Fellowships, The Arnold Zellner Award, and The Bessel Award from the Humboldt Foundation. He delivered the invited Cowles (2009, inaugural), Fisher-Shultz (2019), Hannan (2016), and Sargan (2017) lectures at the Econometric Society Meetings. He served as the inaugural moderator of the new Economics section of ArXiv, which launched in 2017. He was elected fellow by the American Academy of Arts & Sciences, the Econometric Society, and the Institute of Mathematical Statistics.

== Papers ==
Chernozhukov has published papers covering 11 Major themes including

- Central Limit Theorems and Bootstrap with p>>n,
- Big Data: Post-Selection Inference for Causal Effects
- Big Data: Prediction Methods, High-Dimensional Models
- Policy Analysis, Shape Restrictions, Partial Identification and Inference on Sets
- Laplacian and Bayesian Inference,
- Quantiles and Multivariate Quantiles,
- Endogeneity, and Extremes and Non-Regular Models.
