= Frisch Medal =

American economics award

The Frisch Medal is an award in economics given by the Econometric Society. It is awarded every two years for empirical or theoretical applied research published in Econometrica during the previous five years. The award was named in honor of Ragnar Frisch, first co-recipient of the Nobel prize in economics and editor of Econometrica from 1933 to 1954. In the opinion of Rich Jensen, Gilbert F. Schaefer Professor of Economics and chairperson of the Department of Economics of the University of Notre Dame, "The Frisch medal is not only one of the top three prizes in the field of economics, but also the most prestigious 'best article' award in the profession". Five Frisch medal winners have also won the Nobel Prize.

== Winners ==
- 2026 — Bilal, Adrien; Engbom, Niklas; Mongey, Simon; Violante, Giovanni L. (July 2022). "Firm and Worker Dynamics in a Frictional Labor Market". Econometrica. 90 (4): 1425–1462. doi:10.3982/ECTA17955.
- 2024 – Dennis Egger, Johannes Haushofer, Edward Miguel, Paul Niehaus, and Michael Walker for their paper, "General equilibrium effects of cash transfers: experimental evidence from Kenya", (Econometrica, Vol. 90, No. 6, November 2022, 2603-2643)
- 2022 – Giulia Brancaccio, Myrto Kalouptsidi, Theodore Papageorgiou for their paper, "Geography, Transportation, and Endogenous Trade Costs", (Econometrica, Vol. 88, No. 2, March 2020, 657–691).
- 2020 – Kate Ho and Robin Lee for their paper, "Insurer Competition in Health Care Markets", (Econometrica, Vol. 85, No. 2, March 2017, 379–417).
- 2018 – Gabriel M. Ahlfeldt, Stephen J. Redding, Daniel M. Sturm, and Nikolaus Wolf for Ahlfeldt, Gabriel M.; Redding, Stephen J.; Sturm, Daniel M.; Wolf, Nikolaus (2015). "The Economics of Density: Evidence from the Berlin Wall". Econometrica. 83 (6): 2127–2189. doi:10.3982/ECTA10876.
- 2016 – Benjamin Handel, Igal Hendel, and Michael Whinston for Handel, Ben; Hendel, Igal; Whinston, Michael D. (2015). "Equilibria in Health Exchanges: Adverse Selection versus Reclassification Risk". Econometrica. 83 (4): 1261–1313. doi:10.3982/ecta12480.
- 2014 – Flávio Cunha, James Heckman, and Susanne Schennach for Cunha, F.; Heckman, J.; Schennach, S. (May 2010). "Estimating the Technology of Cognitive and Noncognitive Skill Formation". Econometrica. 78 (3): 883–931. doi:10.3982/ECTA6551. hdl:10419/35965. PMC 2885826. PMID 20563300.
- 2012 – Joseph P. Kaboski and Robert M. Townsend for Kaboski, J. P.; Townsend, R. M. (September 2011). "A Structural Evaluation of a Large-Scale Quasi-Experimental Microfinance Initiative". Econometrica. 79 (5): 1357–1406. doi:10.3982/ECTA7079. PMC 3230229. PMID 22162594.
- 2010 – Nicholas Bloom for "The Impact of Uncertainty Shocks". Econometrica. 77 (3): 623–685. May 2009. doi:10.3982/ECTA6248. S2CID 8094691.
- 2008 – David Card and Dean R. Hyslop for Card, David; Hyslop, Dean R. (November 2005). "Estimating the Effects of a Time-Limited Earnings Subsidy for Welfare-Leavers" (PDF). Econometrica. 73 (6): 1723–1770. doi:10.1111/j.1468-0262.2005.00637.x. S2CID 14819756.
- 2006 – Fabien Postel-Vinay and Jean-Marc Robin for Postel-Vinay, Fabien; Robin, Jean-Marc (November 2002). "Equilibrium Wage Dispersion with Worker and Employer Heterogeneity" (PDF). Econometrica. 70 (6): 2295–2350. doi:10.1111/j.1468-0262.2002.00441.x. JSTOR 3081988.
- 2004 – Jonathan Eaton and Samuel Kortum for Eaton, Jonathan; Kortum, Samuel (September 2002). "Technology, Geography, and Trade". Econometrica. 70 (5): 1741–1779. doi:10.1111/1468-0262.00352. JSTOR 3082019.
- 2002 – Ricardo J. Caballero and Eduardo Engel for Caballero, Ricardo J.; Engel, Eduardo (July 1999). "Explaining Investment Dynamics in U.S. Manufacturing: A Generalized (S,s) Approach" (PDF). Econometrica. 67 (4): 783–826. doi:10.1111/1468-0262.00053. JSTOR 2999458. S2CID 158174490.
- 2000 – Richard Blundell, Alan S. Duncan, and Costas Meghir for Blundell, Richard; Duncan, Alan; Meghir, Costas (July 1998). "Estimating Labor Supply Responses Using Tax Reforms". Econometrica. 66 (4): 827–861. doi:10.2307/2999575. JSTOR 2999575.
- 1998 – Robert M. Townsend for Townsend, Robert M. (May 1994). "Risk and Insurance in Village India" (PDF). Econometrica. 62 (3): 539–591. doi:10.2307/2951659. JSTOR 2951659. S2CID 153578326.
- 1996 – Steven T. Berry for Berry, Steven T. (July 1992). "Estimation of a Model of Entry in the Airline Industry". Econometrica. 60 (4): 889–917. doi:10.2307/2951571. JSTOR 2951571. S2CID 56198198.
- 1994 – Larry G. Epstein and Stanley E. Zin for Epstein, Larry G.; Zin, Stanley E. (July 1989). "Substitution, Risk Aversion, and the Temporal Behavior of Consumption and Asset Returns: A Theoretical Framework". Econometrica. 57 (4): 937–969. doi:10.2307/1913778. JSTOR 1913778. S2CID 34563159.
- 1992 – John Rust for Rust, John (September 1987). "Optimal Replacement of GMC Bus Engines: An Empirical Model of Harold Zurcher". Econometrica. 55 (5): 999–1033. doi:10.2307/1911259. JSTOR 1911259.
- 1990 – David M. Newbery for Newbery, David M. (March 1988). "Road Damage Externalities and Road User Charges". Econometrica. 56 (2): 295–316. doi:10.2307/1911073. JSTOR 1911073.
- 1988 – Ariel Pakes for Pakes, Ariel (July 1986). "Patents as Options: Some Estimates of the Value of Holding European Patent Stocks" (PDF). Econometrica. 54 (4): 755–784. doi:10.2307/1912835. JSTOR 1912835.
- 1986 – Jeffrey A. Dubin and Daniel L. McFadden for Dubin, Jeffrey A.; McFadden, Daniel L. (March 1984). "An Econometric Analysis of Residential Electric Appliance Holdings and Consumption". Econometrica. 52 (2): 345–362. doi:10.2307/1911493. JSTOR 1911493.
- 1984 – Lars Peter Hansen and Kenneth J. Singleton for Hansen, Lars Peter; Singleton, Kenneth J. (September 1982). "Generalized Instrumental Variables Estimation of Nonlinear Rational Expectations Models". Econometrica. 50 (5): 1269–1286. doi:10.2307/1911873. JSTOR 1911486.
- 1982 – Orley Ashenfelter for Ashenfelter, Orley (April 1980). "Unemployment as Disequilibrium in a Model of Aggregate Labor Supply". Econometrica. 48 (3): 547–564. doi:10.2307/1913122. JSTOR 1913122.
- 1980 – Jerry A. Hausman and David A. Wise for Hausman, Jerry A.; Wise, David A. (March 1979). "Attrition Bias in Experimental and Panel Data: The Gary Income Maintenance Experiment". Econometrica. 47 (2): 455–473. doi:10.2307/1914193. JSTOR 1914193.
- 1978 – Angus S. Deaton for Deaton, Angus S. (March 1974). "The Analysis of Consumer Demand in the United Kingdom, 1900–1970". Econometrica. 42 (2): 341–367. doi:10.2307/1911983. JSTOR 1911983.

== See also ==
- List of economics awards
