= Gary E. Chamberlain =

Gary E. Chamberlain (1948 – 2020) was a Harvard University Louis Berkman Professor of Economics. His main areas of research was in application of econometrics techniques to the analysis of education economics; that is on the returns to education, the effects of schools and their teachers on students test scores and later college attendance. His academic standing led to several prestigious appointments including: National Academy of Sciences (elected to); American Economic Association (appointed a Distinguished Fellow); American Academy of Arts and Sciences (a Distinguished Fellow ); the Econometric Society (appointed Fellow and Council member and gave its prestigious Fisher–Schultz Lecture in 2001).

The Journal of Econometrics published in 2022 a special edition in honour of Chamberlain.

He earned degrees from Harvard University (BA and PhD) and later taught at the University of Wisconsin at Madison.

== Selected publications ==
- Chamberlain, G. (1987). Asymptotic efficiency in estimation with conditional moment restrictions. Journal of econometrics, 34(3), 305-334.
- Chamberlain, G. (2000). Econometrics and decision theory. Journal of Econometrics, 95(2), 255-283.
- Chamberlain, G. E. (2013). Predictive effects of teachers and schools on test scores, college attendance, and earnings. Proceedings of the National Academy of Sciences, 110(43), 17176-17182.
