= Theoretical Economics =

- Discipline: Economics
- Language: English
- Edited by: Federico Echenique

Publication details
- History: 2006-present
- Publisher: Econometric Society
- Frequency: Triannually
- Open access: Yes

Standard abbreviations
- ISO 4: Theor. Econ.

Indexing
- ISSN: 1555-7561
- LCCN: 2006210822
- OCLC no.: 63173971

Links
- Journal homepage; Journal page at publisher's website; Online archive

Theoretical Economics is a peer-reviewed open access academic journal that publishes theoretical papers in all areas of economics. The journal was established in 2006. From then until 2009, it was published by the Society for Economic Theory. On July 1, 2009, the Econometric Society took over the journal. The current editor is Federico Echenique. The journal is abstracted and indexed in Current Contents/Social and Behavioral Sciences and the Social Sciences Citation Index.
