= Shouyong Shi =

- Education: Huazhong University of Science and Technology
- Scientific career
- Fields: Economics
- Workplaces: The Pennsylvania State University

Shouyong Shi is a Canadian economist and member of the Pennsylvania State University faculty. He is a tier 1 Canada Research Chair as well as a Research Fellow at the Bank of Canada.

Shi's research focuses on topics in macroeconomics and labour economics. He is co-editor of the economics journal Annals of Economics and Finance.

== Biography ==
Shi received his B.Sc. at 19 years of age from the Huazhong University of Science and Technology in 1984. He later obtained M.A. and Ph.D. from the University of Toronto in 1988 and 1991 respectively.

== Influential works ==
- Guido Menzio and Shouyong Shi, "Efficient Search on the Job and the Business Cycle", Journal of Political Economy 119 (2011), 468–510.
- Shouyong Shi, "Directed Search for Equilibrium Wage-Tenure Contracts", Econometrica 77 (2009), 561–584.
- Allen Head and Shouyong Shi, "A Fundamental Theory of Exchange Rates and Direct Currency Trades", Journal of Monetary Economics 50 (2003), 1555–1591.
- Shouyong Shi, "A Directed Search Model of Inequality with Heterogeneous Skills and Skill-Biased Technology", Review of Economic Studies 69 (2002), 467–491.
- Kenneth Burdett, Shouyong Shi, Randall Wright, "Pricing and Matching with Frictions", Journal of Political Economy 109 (2001), 1060–1085.
- Shouyong Shi, "Frictional Assignment. I. Efficiency", Journal of Economic Theory 98 (2001), 232–260.
- Shouyong Shi, "A Divisible Search Model of Fiat Money", Econometrica 65 (1997), 75–102.
- Shouyong Shi, "Money and Prices: A Model of Search and Bargaining", Journal of Economic Theory 67 (1995), 467–496.
