= John Chown =

British monetary economist

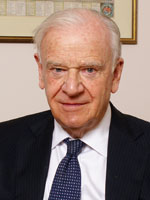
- Education: Gordonstoun and Selwyn College, Cambridge
- Occupations: Monetary economist and international tax specialist
- Awards: Adam Smith Prize
- Website: johnchown.co.uk

John Chown is a monetary economist in the United Kingdom who made his career as an international tax specialist with particular reference to currency and financial markets. Since retiring from Chown Dewhurst LLP he has remained very active, taking part in discussions on public policy issues with special reference to the development of capital markets and encouragement of inward investment into transitional and emerging economies, the future of the Eurozone, and advising on. He also works closely with a group advising on the financing of high-tech, 'disruptive' start-ups.

== Early life and education ==
Chown was educated at Gordonstoun and Selwyn College, Cambridge, where he won the Adam Smith Prize for a dissertation on fixed versus floating exchange rates, was awarded the Wrenbury Scholarship as top of his year, and is now an Honorary Fellow of the College. He served for many years on the Investment Committee.

== Career ==
In 1962, Chown founded his tax advisory company, J F Chown & Company Limited, now Chown Dewhurst LLP. He has been a public policy adviser to Conservative Chancellors and Shadow Chancellors, commenting on European tax harmonisation proposals and visiting Canada, Australia, New Zealand as an international adviser on their respective tax reforms. He was active in the Know How Fund, which provided market and taxation advice to transitional countries after the collapse of Communism, he continued to do advisory work in Russia, including a World Bank project of the development of capital markets and has worked, with Jackie Newbury, on projects in Mongolia and Thailand and has been on many City of London missions.

Chown is a co-founder of the Institute for Fiscal Studies and remains on the Committee of the International Tax Specialist Group, is active in the Political Economy Club, the Centre for the Study of Financial Innovation, the Official Monetary and Financial Institutions Forum, and several other Think Tanks.

He is Honorary Financial Adviser to the Royal Society of Musicians (and now an 'Honorary Member') and is still very active with the London Handel Society and other musical charities.

=== Writings ===
Chown wrote several books on tax policy, is the author of "A History of Monetary Unions" (Routledge 2003), and has contributed a chapter, "Lessons of Monetary History", to the IEA study, "The Euro – the Beginning, the Middle .. and the End?" (April 2013) and reviewed for Central Banking, Harold James "Making the European Monetary Union" (February 2013).

Two articles and several other reviews in Central Banking deal more generally with the financial crisis. In November 2009, he wrote an article "Towards a New Banking System!", in which he commented briefly on the problems arising from bad practices in the banking system. The editor invited him to follow up on this in "Conflicts of Interest and System Risk", Central Banking, November 2010, discusses improper (and therefore unsustainable) profits made by banks, and their potential threat to financial stability, was a follow-up to an earlier article in November 2009, "Towards a New Banking System". Several subsequent book reviews followed up on his point. He has contributed chapters to more than fifteen books on the topics of tax reform and monetary policy.

Chown, shocked by the way in which the banks were making very substantial hidden profits out of Initial Public Offerings by exploiting conflicts of interest, he made major campaigns and published "End to Underwriting: How the Coalition can avoid being Ripped Off!", Centre for Policy Studies, August 2011. When the EU proposed a Financial Transactions Tax (the Tobin Tax), Chown was invited to give evidence to the House of Lords Committee in late 2011 and followed this with a publication "Time To Bin The Tobin Tax" Centre for Policy Studies, April 2012.

2019

- Review by John Chown. "Shadow Networks; financial disorder and the system that caused crisis." Francisco Louca and Michael Ash. OUP, 2018, 416 pages. In Central Banking Vo. XXX, Number 1, September 2019. p 156-157.

2018

- Review by John Chown. "Edge of Chaos: why democracy is failing to deliver economic growth". Dambisa Moyo. Little, Brown, 2018, 320 pages. In Central Banking, Vol. XXIX, Number 1, August 2018.

2017

- Review by John Chown. "Crash Bang Wallop: The Inside Story of London's Big Bang and a Financial Revolution that Changed the World", Sceptre, 2016, 352 pages. In Central Banking Vol. XXVIII, Number 1, August 2017.
- “What the Financial Crisis should have taught us about conflicts of interest and how to avoid them. John Chown, David Russell, QC. Trust & Trustees, January 2017, Oxford University Press. Trusts & Trustees (2017) 23 (2): 209-214. DOI:https://doi.org/10.1093/tandt/ttw221
- John Chown. "How to Sell the Family Silver – Lessons from the Royal Mail Sale". The Pointmaker. Centre for Policy studies, May 2016.
- "The Tobin Tax Rears its Ugly Head, Again", John Chown, The Pointmaker, Centre for Policy Studies, May 2013

== Books ==
- A history of monetary unions. London [u.a.]: Routledge. 2003, ISBN 9780415277372.
- The Taxation of Foreign Exchange and Derivatives – John Chown & Kim Desai, Financial Times Financial Publishing, Pearson Professional Limited, ISBN 1 85334 714 0, 1997.
- A History of Money – from AD 800 – John Chown, Routledge, London and New York, 1994, ISBN 0-415-10279-0, paperback 1996.
- "Tax Efficient Foreign Exchange Management" - John F Chown. Woodhead Faulkner, Cambridge, 1990. ISBN 0 85941 595 3.
- "Tax Efficient Forex Management" - Professional Publishing. 1986.
- "Taxation and Social Security Europe" – The Economist Publications in conjunction with J F Chown and Company Limited. Editor: John F Chown, 1985.
- "Taxation and Social Security Europe" – Mica International in conjunction with J F Chown and Company Limited. Editor: John F Chown, 1984.
- "Foreign Exchange Risk: A Tax and Financial Analysis" – (Oyez Longman 1983.)
- "Offshore Financial Centres" – J F Chown (4th ed revised by Mary Cook) Banker Research Unit, 1981 (1st ed, 1975 as Offshore Investment Centres).
- The taxation of direct investment in the United States. London: Butterworths. 1980, ISBN 978-0-406-53958-8.
- "Corporate Finance under Floating Exchange Rates" – J F Chown. Cityforum Ltd, 1979.
- "Foreign Currency Debt Management" – J F Chown and M J Finney. J F Chown and Company Limited, 1977.
- "Investing in the Eastern Mediterranean" – J F Chown and G N Stathopoulos. J F Chown and Company Limited, 1977.
- "Taxation and Multinational Enterprise" – J F Chown. Longman, 1974.
- "Acquisition of Assets, Companies and Real Estate in Europe" – J F Chown and M Edwardes Ker. Financial Times, 1974, published by The Financial Times.
- "Corporation Tax under the Imputation System" – John Chown and Richard Norman. Financial Times 1973.
- "VAT Explained" – J F Chown. Kogan Page, 1972 and 1973.
- "International Fund Year Book" – John Chown Editorial consultant, Investors Chronicle publication, July 1970, published Throgmorton Publications Limited, 1970.
- "International Bond Market in the 1960s" – J F Chown and R Valentine. Frederick A Praeger, 1968.
