= Richard Blundell =

British economist (born 1952)

Sir Richard Blundell CBE FBA
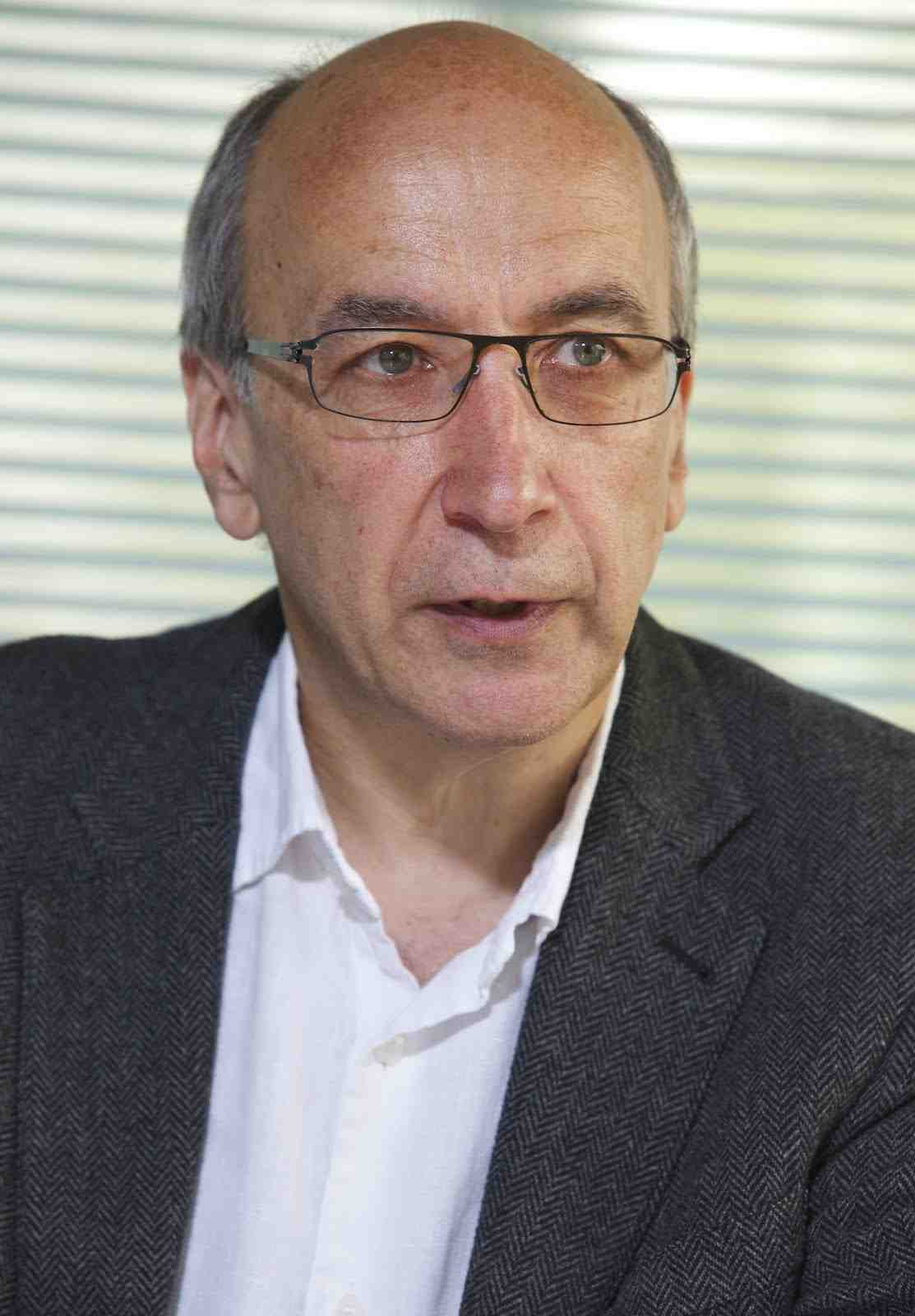
- Born: 1 May 1952 (age 74); Shoreham-by-Sea, England, United Kingdom

Academic background
- Education: London School of Economics

Academic work
- Discipline: Econometrics; Microeconomics; Labour economics
- Institutions: University College London; University of British Columbia; Massachusetts Institute of Technology; University of California, Berkeley; Northwestern University
- Doctoral students: Costas Meghir; John Van Reenen; Nicholas Bloom
- Awards: Knighthood (2014); BBVA Foundation Frontiers of Knowledge Award (2014); Nemmers Prize (2016)
- Website: Information at IDEAS / RePEc

Sir Richard William Blundell CBE FBA (born 1 May 1952 in Shoreham-by-Sea) is a British economist and econometrician.

Blundell is the David Ricardo Professor of Political Economy at the Department of Economics of University College London and the Co-Director of the ESRC Centre for the Microeconomic Analysis of Public Policy at the Institute for Fiscal Studies. He is also Associate Faculty Member, TSE, Toulouse. He was the Research Director at the Institute for Fiscal Studies between 1986 and 2016. He is a Fellow of the Econometric Society (1991), Fellow of the British Academy (1996), Honorary Member of the American Economic Association (2001), Honorary Member American Academy of Arts and Sciences (2002), Honorary Fellow of the Institute of Actuaries (2003), Fellow of the Society of Labor Economists (2005), and Foreign Associate of the National Academy of Sciences (2019).

Blundell has received honorary doctorates from the University of St. Gallen, Switzerland in 2003; the University of Mannheim in 2011; the Norwegian School of Economics NHH in 2011; the Università della Svizzera italiana in 2016; the University of Bristol in 2017; the Ca' Foscari University of Venice in 2018; and the Athens School of Economics, AUEB in 2022. He was knighted in the 2014 New Year Honours for services to economics and social science.

== Career ==
Blundell received his B.Sc. in economics with statistics from University of Bristol in 1973 before he graduated with a master's degree in econometrics and mathematical economics from the London School of Economics in 1975.

He held a position as lecturer in econometrics at the University of Manchester from 1975 to 1984. He was appointed Professor of Economics at University College London in 1984 and research director of the IFS in 1986, before establishing the ESRC Centre for the Microeconomic Analysis of Fiscal Policy at IFS in 1991. He was visiting professor of economics at UBC in 1980, at MIT in 1993, at Berkeley in 2000 and at Northwestern University in 2017.

He was co-editor of Econometrica from 1997 to 2001 and co-editor of the Journal of Econometrics from 1992 to 1997. He currently edits Microeconomic Insights.

In 2004, Blundell became president of the European Economic Association, in 2006, president of the Econometric Society in 2010, president of The Society of Labor Economics in 2010 and served as president of the Royal Economic Society (2011–2013).

== Awards ==
In 1995, Blundell received the Yrjö Jahnsson Award, given by the European Economic Association every two years to the best young economist in Europe (aged under 45), for his work in microeconometrics and the analysis of labour supply, welfare reform and consumer behaviour. In 2000, he was awarded the Econometric Society's Frisch Medal, awarded every two years for empirical or theoretical applied research published in Econometrica during the previous five years. In 2008, he was recipient of the Jean-Jacques Laffont Prize 2008 given by the Toulouse School of Economics to an international high level economist whose research combines both the theoretical and applied aspects of economics. He was the 2010 Distinguished Center for Economic Studies Fellow, an annual prize given by the CES of LMU Munich to an outstanding economist who has greatly contributed to the understanding of economic policy problems. In 2012, he was recipient of the IZA Prize in Labor Economics awarded by IZA for outstanding academic achievements in the field of labour economics.

In 2014, Blundell received, with David Card, the BBVA Foundation Frontiers of Knowledge Award in Economics, Finance and Management for "their contributions to empirical microeconomics," in the words of the jury's citation. "Motivated by important empirical questions, they developed and estimated appropriate econometric models, making significant methodological contributions in the process. Both are known for their attention to institutional detail, careful and innovative research design, rigorous application of econometric tools, and dispassionate reporting of results." In 2016, Blundell received the Nemmers Prize in Economics at Northwestern University for "his important contributions to labor economics, public finance and applied econometrics".

He was elected a foreign associate of the US National Academy of Sciences in April 2019. In 2020, he was awarded the Jacob Mincer Prize for lifetime contributions to the field of Labor Economics.

== Publications ==
He has published six books and many articles on econometrics, microeconomics, consumer behaviour, public economics, applied economics, economic theory, inequality and labour economics. He is an editor and panel member of the IFS Mirrlees Review and editor and panel member of the IFS-Deaton Review: Inequality in the 21st Century. Among his six books, Labor Supply and Taxation is Blundell's most distinguished book, in which he presents research on the behaviour of individuals on the labour market respond to social policy influence and taxation, and on the modern labour markets and public policy reforms.

=== Books ===
- Labor Supply and Taxation, 2016.
- The Determinants and Effects of Work-Related Training in Britain, 1996.
- Higher education, employment and earnings in Britain, 1997.
- Mirrlees Review: Vol II: Tax by Design, 1997.

== Personal life ==
His brother is the biochemist Tom Blundell. Blundell is a jazz and folk fan, and plays guitar and saxophone, playing in a band when a student at the University of Bristol.
