= Fiscal Studies =

Quarterly peer-reviewed academic journal

- Discipline: Finance, economics
- Language: English
- Edited by: James Banks, Pierre Cahuc, Monica Costa Dias, Matthias Parey, Kimberley Scharf, James Ziliak

Publication details
- History: 1979-present
- Publisher: Wiley-Blackwell on behalf of the Institute for Fiscal Studies
- Frequency: Quarterly
- Impact factor: 7.3 (2022)

Standard abbreviations
- ISO 4: Fisc. Stud.

Indexing
- ISSN: 0143-5671 (print); 1475-5890 (web)
- JSTOR: 01435671
- OCLC no.: 60630409

Links
- Journal homepage; Online access; Online archive

Fiscal Studies is a quarterly peer-reviewed academic journal published by Wiley on behalf of the Institute for Fiscal Studies. The journal was established in 1979 and aims to bridge the gap between academic research and policy, including applied microeconomics to consider how policies affect individuals, families, businesses, and public finance. Published papers cover a broad range of topical issues.

According to the Journal Citation Reports, the journal has a 2022 impact factor of 7.3.

The journal's editors are drawn from among the institute's own research staff and from its Fellows and Associates. In 2023 the editors are James Banks, Pierre Cahuc, Monica Costa Dias, Matthias Parey, Kimberley Scharf, and James P. Ziliak.
