= Ariel Pakes =

American economist (born 1949)

Ariél Pakes
- Born: Ariél Stanley Pakes; 1949 (age 76–77)
- Citizenship: American, Canadian

Academic background
- Education: Hebrew University of Jerusalem (BA, MA); Harvard University (MA, PhD)
- Doctoral advisor: Zvi Griliches

Academic work
- Institutions: Harvard University; Yale University; University of Wisconsin-Madison
- Doctoral students: Steven T. Berry; Kate Ho; Samuel S. Kortum; Matthew Gentzkow; Emi Nakamura; Rebecca Diamond
- Awards: Frisch Medal (1988); BBVA Foundation Frontiers of Knowledge Award (2018); Erwin Plein Nemmers Prize in Economics (2022)
- Website: Information at IDEAS / RePEc

Ariel Stanley Pakes (born 1949) is the Thomas Professor of Economics at Harvard University. He specializes in econometrics and industrial organization.

He is a fellow of the Econometric Society and the American Academy of Arts and Sciences, a winner of the Frisch Medal, and a recipient of the BBVA Foundation Frontiers of Knowledge Award. He was elected to the National Academy of Sciences in 2017. Pakes was the Distinguished Fellow of the Industrial Organization in 2007. In 2017, he received the Jean-Jacques Laffont Prize and in 2018 the BBVA Frontiers of Knowledge Award. In 2019, Pakes was appointed a distinguished fellow of the American Economic Association. In 2022, he won the Erwin Plein Nemmers Prize in Economics.

== Education and career ==
He received his B.A. and M.A. from the Hebrew University of Jerusalem in 1971 and 1973 and an M.A. and PhD from Harvard University in 1976 and 1979.

Pakes's research has focused on developing methods for empirically analyzing market responses to environmental and policy changes. This includes developing: i) demand systems that are capable of analyzing the impact of environmental changes (e.g. mergers) on prices, ii) methods capable of analyzing the impact of policy changes (e.g. deregulation) on productivity, and iii) models capable of following the impacts of these changes on the evolution of markets over time. He and his co-authors have applied these tools to the analysis of the auto, electricity, health care, and telecommunications equipment industries. Pakes also developed techniques for analyzing the impacts of privately funded research and development activity, for constructing a more accurate Consumer Price Index, and for analyzing the impact of incentive schemes on the hospital allocations of doctors.

Many of Pakes's methodological contributions have been incorporated into the work of government agencies and private firms. Pakes has mentored over sixty doctoral students, many of whom are now leading researchers at prestigious universities. Additionally, he has done work for a number of consultancies, government agencies, and large firms.

He is most famous for the Berry–Levinsohn–Pakes (BLP) approach to demand estimation and the Olley–Pakes approach to estimation of production functions.

== Accolades ==
Pakes has received numerous awards and honors recognizing his contributions to economics and antitrust analysis. In 1986, he received the Frisch Medal from the Econometric Society for the best applied article published in Econometrica over the preceding four years, awarded for his paper “Patents as Options: Some Estimates of the Value of Holding European Patent Stocks.” He was elected a Fellow of the Econometric Society in 1988 and a Fellow of the American Academy of Arts and Sciences in 2002.

Pakes was named a Distinguished Fellow of the Industrial Organization Society in 2007. In 2017, he was elected to the National Academy of Sciences, where he later became chair of the Economics Section and a member of its investment committee. That same year, he received the Jean-Jacques Laffont Prize, which honors economists whose work combines theory and empirical analysis in the spirit of Jean-Jacques Laffont.

In 2018, Pakes jointly received the BBVA Foundation Frontiers of Knowledge Award in Economics, Finance and Management with Timothy Bresnahan and Robert Porter, recognizing their development of methodologies that have had a lasting impact on industrial organization and applied economics. He was appointed a Distinguished Fellow of the American Economic Association in 2019 and elected a Fellow of the International Association of Applied Economists the same year.

In 2020, Pakes was named a Clarivate Citation Laureate, based on the influence of his co-authored 1995 Econometrica article “Automobile Prices in Market Equilibrium,” written with Steven Berry and James Levinsohn. In 2022, he received the Erwin Plein Nemmers Prize in Economics for fundamental contributions to empirical industrial organization, particularly in the study of market power, pricing, mergers, and productivity.

In 2023, Pakes was recognized by Global Competition Review with its Annual Award for Prosecution of Collusion and was also honored by the American Antitrust Institute for Outstanding Antitrust Litigation Achievement in Economics, both in connection with his work on the Blue Cross Blue Shield Antitrust Litigation.
