= Paul J. Zak =

American neuroeconomist

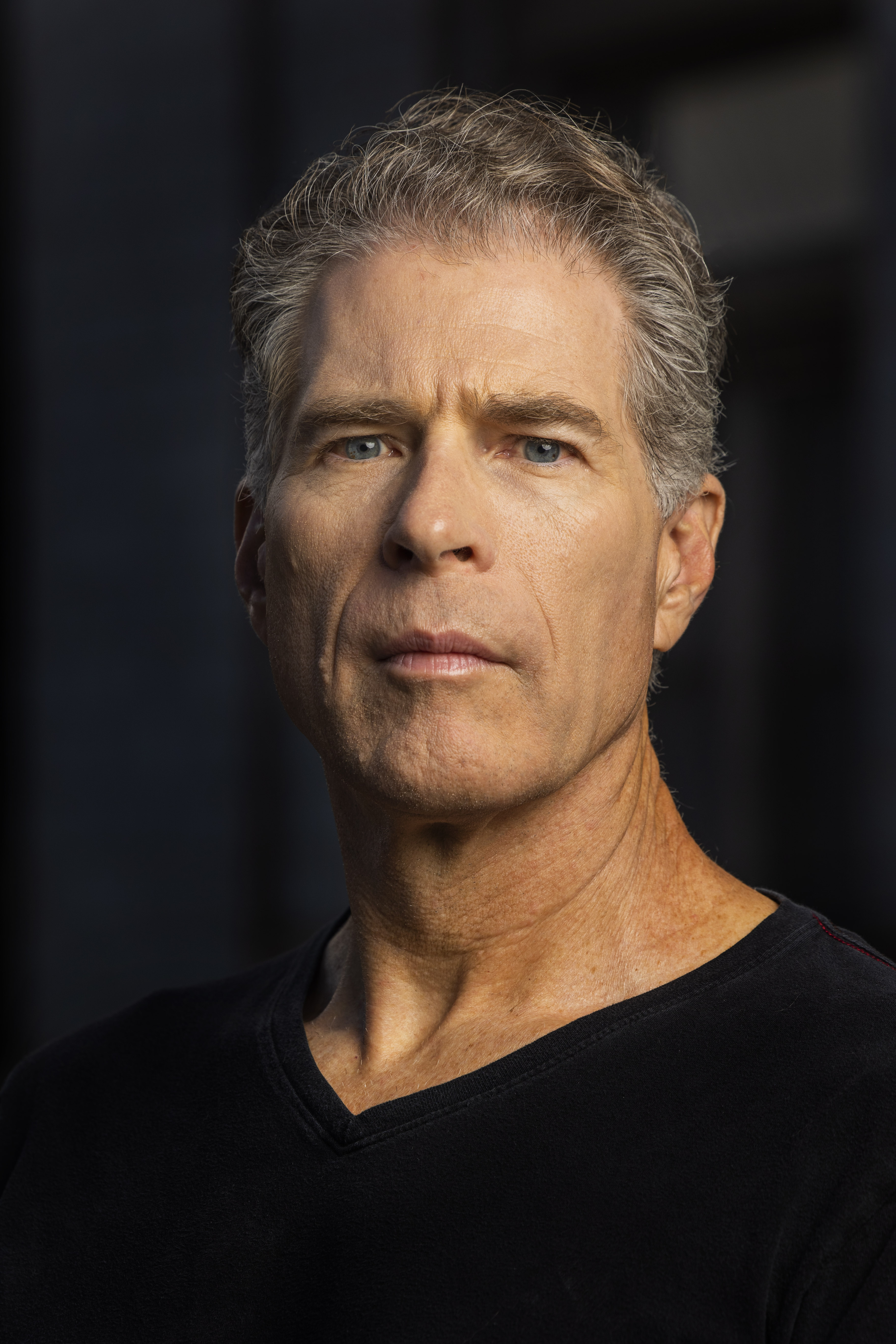
- Born: February 9, 1962 (age 64)

Academic background
- Education: San Diego State University, University of Pennsylvania
- Doctoral advisor: Randall Wright

Academic work
- Institutions: Claremont Graduate University
- Notable ideas: Neuroeconomics

Paul J. Zak (born 9 February 1962) is an American neuroeconomist.

== Background ==
Zak is a university professor at Claremont Graduate University. He graduated with degrees in mathematics and economics from San Diego State University before acquiring a PhD in economics from the University of Pennsylvania. He is professor at Claremont Graduate University in Southern California. He has studied brain imaging, and was among the first to identify the role of oxytocin in mediating trusting behaviors between unacquainted humans. Zak directs the Center for Neuroeconomics Studies at Claremont Graduate University and is a member of the Neurology Department at Loma Linda University Medical Center. He edited Moral Markets: The Critical Role of Values in the Economy (Princeton University Press, 2008). His book, The Moral Molecule was published in 2012 by Dutton. The book summarizes his findings on oxytocin and discusses the role of oxytocin in human experiences and behaviors such as empathy, altruism, and morality.

Zak's research aims to challenge the thought that people generally are driven primarily to act for what they consider their self-interest, and asks how morality may modulate one's interpretation of what constitutes "self-interest" in one's own personal terms. Methodological questions have arisen in regards to Zak's work, however. Other commentators though have called his work "one of the most revealing experiments in the history of economics." According to The Moral Molecule, Zak's father was an engineer and he takes an engineering approach to neuroscience, seeking to create predictive models of behavior.

His research and ideas have garnered some criticism, particularly from science writer Ed Yong, who points out that oxytocin administration boosts schadenfreude and envy. Oxytocin administration increases the salience of social cues, suggesting that priming effects in these experiments explain their findings. For example, Zak has shown that endogenous oxytocin release eliminates in-group bias indicating that the critiqued effects are due to supraphysiologic doses of oxytocin coupled with antisocial priming.

Neuroscientist Molly Crockett also disputes Zak's claims, referring to studies that show oxytocin increases gloating, bias at the expense of other groups, and in some cases decreasing cooperation; suggesting oxytocin is as much an "immoral molecule" as 'the moral molecule' Paul Zak claims.

== Neuromanagement ==
Zak has coined the term "neuromanagement" to describe how findings in neuroscience can be used to create organizational cultures that are highly engaging for employees and produce high performance for organizations. He has developed a methodology called Ofactor that quantifies organizational culture and identifies how to continuously improve culture to increase trust, joy, and performance. He has used Ofactor to help organizations ranging from nonprofits to startups to Fortune 50 companies change their cultures. His Ofactor research reflects the approach advocated by his late colleague at Claremont Graduate University, management guru Peter F. Drucker, in which organizations with flat hierarchies empower employees. His 2017 book Trust Factor: The Science of Creating High-Performance Companies shows leaders of organizations how to create and sustain a culture of trust.

== Scholarly impact ==
Zak has published more than 200 peer-reviewed papers, book chapters, and commentaries. He was listed by researchers at Stanford University as being in the world's top 0.3% of the most cited scientists.

== Immersion and consumer neuroscience ==
Zak's lab has discovered a combination of neurologic signals that measure the value the brain obtain from social-emotional experiences, which he named "Immersion." These data accurately predict behaviors, including purchases, information recall, and social shares. These 1 Hz data also capture engagement in stories and post-narrative decisions. Published research shows that neurological Immersion in stories reduces racial bias and increases support for economic freedom. Some of this work was funded by DARPA to help the U.S. military reduce conflict. In 2017, he co-founded Immersion Neuroscience, a neurotechnology platform that subscribers use to quantify the return on experience by measuring neurological Immersion from wrist-worn sensors. Immersion data also show 99% concordance with people's mood and 98% with their energy showing the emotional health applications of continuously measuring the value of experiences. Immersion Neuroscience's free app SIX identifies what people's brains value the most so they can improve their emotional fitness.

== Media ==
Zak is frequently interviewed in the media on topics ranging from economic policy to romantic relationships. His 2011 TED talk on oxytocin and trust has gained over a million views. He was named by Wired magazine as one of the 10 Sexiest Geeks in 2005. Zak suggests that intimate contact, using social ritual and social media such as using Twitter and Facebook raises oxytocin levels. He is a frequent public speaker on the neuroscience of daily life, including morality, storytelling, and organizational culture and writes articles for magazines and trade publication on these topics.

Zak is a member of the Screen Actors Guild and has created and voiced science dialog for movies, including The Amazing Spiderman. He is a regular panelist on the Discovery Science program Outrageous Acts of Psych. News organizations often request his expertise on neuroscience. In 2016, he was featured on The Bachelor as Dr. Love on one of the main characters' dates. His other TV appearances include Fareed Zakaria's GPS on CNN, the John Stossel show on Fox Business, the Dr. Phil show, TakePart Live on Pivot TV, Fox and Friends, Good Morning America, The Bachelorette, and ABC World News Tonight.

== Publications ==
=== Books ===
- Paul J. Zak (2022). The Little Book of Happiness: A Scientific Approach to Living Better. Houndstooth Press. ISBN 978-1544547886.
- Paul J. Zak (2022). Immersion: The Science of the Extraordinary and the Source of Happiness. Lioncrest Publishing. ISBN 978-1-5445-3197-7.
- Paul J. Zak (2017). Trust Factor: The Science of Creating High-Performance Companies. AMACOM. ISBN 978-0-8144-3766-7.
- Paul J. Zak (2012). The Moral Molecule: The Source of Love and Prosperity. Dutton. ISBN 978-0-525-95281-7.
- Paul J. Zak (2008). Moral Markets: The Critical Role of Values in the Economy. Princeton University Press. ISBN 978-0-691-13523-6.

=== Journal articles ===
- Zak, Paul J. (2004). "Neuroeconomics". Philosophical Transactions of the Royal Society B: Biological Sciences. 359 (1451): 1737–1748. doi:10.1098/rstb.2004.1544. PMC 1693452. PMID 15590614.
- Zak, P. J.; Kurzban, R.; Matzner, W. T. (2004). "The Neurobiology of Trust". Annals of the New York Academy of Sciences. 1032 (1): 224–227. Bibcode:2004NYASA1032..224Z. doi:10.1196/annals.1314.025. PMID 15677415. S2CID 45599465.
- Kosfeld, M.; Heinrichs, M.; Zak, P. J.; Fischbacher, U.; Fehr, E. (2005). "Oxytocin increases trust in humans". Nature. 435 (7042): 673–676. Bibcode:2005Natur.435..673K. doi:10.1038/nature03701. PMID 15931222. S2CID 1234727.
- Zak, P.; Kurzban, R.; Matzner, W. (2005). "Oxytocin is associated with human trustworthiness". Hormones and Behavior. 48 (5): 522–527. doi:10.1016/j.yhbeh.2005.07.009. PMID 16109416. S2CID 14415118.
- Zak, P. J.; Borja, K.; Matzner, W. T.; Kurzban, R. (2005). "The Neuroeconomics of Distrust: Sex Differences in Behavior and Physiology". American Economic Review. 95 (2): 360–3. doi:10.1257/000282805774669709. hdl:10983/26303. PMID 29125276.
- Zak, P. J.; Stanton, A. A.; Ahmadi, S. (2007). Brosnan, Sarah (ed.). "Oxytocin Increases Generosity in Humans". PLOS ONE. 2 (11) e1128. Bibcode:2007PLoSO...2.1128Z. doi:10.1371/journal.pone.0001128. PMC 2040517. PMID 17987115.
- Morhenn, V.; Park, J.; Piper, E.; Zak, P. (2008). "Monetary sacrifice among strangers is mediated by endogenous oxytocin release after physical contact". Evolution and Human Behavior. 29 (6): 375. doi:10.1016/j.evolhumbehav.2008.04.004.
- Barraza, J. A.; Zak, P. J. (2009). "Empathy toward Strangers Triggers Oxytocin Release and Subsequent Generosity". Annals of the New York Academy of Sciences. 1167 (1): 182–189. Bibcode:2009NYASA1167..182B. doi:10.1111/j.1749-6632.2009.04504.x. PMID 19580564. S2CID 1197420.
- Lin, P. Y.; Grewal, N. S.; Morin, C.; Johnson, W. D.; Zak, P. J. (2013). Boraud, Thomas (ed.). "Oxytocin Increases the Influence of Public Service Advertisements". PLOS ONE. 8 (2) e56934. doi:10.1371/journal.pone.0056934. PMC 3584120. PMID 23460821.
- Merolla, J. L.; Burnett, G.; Pyle, K. V.; Ahmadi, S.; Zak, P. J. (2013). "Oxytocin and the Biological Basis for Interpersonal and Political Trust". Political Behavior. 35 (4): 753–776. doi:10.1007/s11109-012-9219-8. S2CID 143426730.
- Sapra, S.; Beavin, L. E.; Zak, P. J. (2012). Veitia, Reiner Albert (ed.). "A Combination of Dopamine Genes Predicts Success by Professional Wall Street Traders". PLOS ONE. 7 (1) e30844. Bibcode:2012PLoSO...730844S. doi:10.1371/journal.pone.0030844. PMC 3265532. PMID 22292056.
- Barraza, J. A.; Alexander, V.; Beavin, L. E.; Terris, E. T.; Zak, P. J. (2015). "The heart of the story: Peripheral physiology during narrative exposure predicts charitable giving". Biological Psychology. 105: 138–143. doi:10.1016/j.biopsycho.2015.01.008. PMID 25617658. S2CID 14306833.
- Barraza, J. A.; Hu, X.; Terris, E.T.; Wang, C.; Zak, P. J. (2021). "Oxytocin increases perceived competence and social-emotional engagement with brands". PLOS ONE. 16 (11) e0260589. Bibcode:2021PLoSO..1660589B. doi:10.1371/journal.pone.0260589. PMC 8631632. PMID 34847200.
- Zak, P.J.; Curry, B.; Owen, T.; Barraza, J.A. (2022). "Oxytocin Release Increases With Age and Is Associated With Life Satisfaction and Prosocial Behaviors". Front. Behav. Neurosci. 16 846234. doi:10.3389/fnbeh.2022.846234. PMC 9069134. PMID 35530727.
- Zak, P.J.; Barraza, J.A.; Hu, X.; Zahedzadeh, G.; Murray, J. (2022). "Predicting Dishonesty When the Stakes Are High: Physiologic Responses During Face-to-Face Interactions Identifies Who Reneges on Promises to Cooperate". Front. Behav. Neurosci. 15 787905. doi:10.3389/fnbeh.2021.787905. PMC 8845462. PMID 35177971.

=== Multimedia ===
- TED Talk The Moral Molecule
- TEDx Amsterdam Talk The Science of Good and Evil
- TEDx Amsterdam Women Talk Biological Differences Between Men and Women
- Empathy, Neurochemistry, and the Dramatic Arc on YouTube
