= Rupert Harrison =

British economist and portfolio manager

Rupert Harrison CBE
- Born: 1 November 1978 (age 47); São Paulo, Brazil
- Education: Magdalen College, Oxford, University College London
- Occupations: Economist, Portfolio Manager
- Employer: BlackRock
- Known for: Chief of Staff to George Osborne (2006–2015), Chair of the Council of Economic Advisers (UK Treasury)
- Political party: Conservative

Rupert Harrison CBE (born 1 November 1978) is a British economist and a portfolio manager at PIMCO. He was from 2006 to 2015 the chief of staff to George Osborne, the British Chancellor of the Exchequer, and chair of the Council of Economic Advisers in the UK Treasury. After the 2022 mini Budget he was appointed to the Economic Advisory Council convened by Chancellor of the Exchequer, Jeremy Hunt. In June 2023, he was selected as the Conservative Party candidate for the Bicester & Woodstock constituency at the 2024 general election.

== Early life and education ==
Born in São Paulo, Harrison is the youngest son of a bank manager and a French teacher. He won a scholarship to Eton College (where he was Captain of School).

He then went to Magdalen College, Oxford University where he initially studied physics. However, he switched to Philosophy, Politics and Economics, graduating with first-class honours. One of his tutors at Oxford was Stewart Wood, who went on to become an adviser to both Gordon Brown and Ed Miliband, and the two remained friends.

In 2007, he obtained a PhD degree in economics from University College London with a thesis entitled, Innovation and technology adoption. His academic research was published in the American Economic Review, the Economic Journal, and the Review of Economics and Statistics amongst others.

== Career ==
From 2002, Harrison worked at the Institute for Fiscal Studies as Senior Research Economist.

From 2006 to 2010, he was chief economic advisor to the then Leader of the Opposition David Cameron and Shadow Chancellor George Osborne. From 2010 to 2015, he was chief of staff to UK Chancellor of the Exchequer, George Osborne, and chair of the UK's Council of Economic Advisors.

In August 2015, Harrison joined the investment firm BlackRock, where he was a portfolio manager and chief macro strategist for multi-asset strategies.

Harrison has written opinion pieces for the Financial Times and has regularly appeared as a commentator on TV and radio.

Harrison was appointed as a member of the government's Economic Advisory Council by Chancellor Jeremy Hunt in 2022.

In June 2023, he was selected to stand as the Conservative candidate for the constituency of Bicester and Woodstock in the 2024 general election. However, he was not elected.

He is currently a Senior Adviser at PIMCO.

== Recognition ==
In 2014 Harrison was said to be one of the most powerful people in the UK and to be the main reason why Osborne could be a "part time" Chancellor.

In March 2014, he was the subject of the BBC Radio 4 Profile programme.

Harrison was appointed a Commander of the Order of the British Empire (CBE) in the 2015 Dissolution Honours Lists on 27 August 2015.

== Personal life ==
In his first year at Oxford he was in a band called Psychid with three other students.

In 2004, he married Jo Orpin, a Magdalen contemporary who has worked as a divorce lawyer and family therapist.

In January 2017 he co-founded and became Chair of The Fore, a charity dedicated to funding small charities and social enterprises. In 2023 he stepped down as Chair and he remains a Senior Adviser.
