= Badi Baltagi =

Lebanese-American economist (born 1954)

Badi Hani Baltagi; born August 20, 1954) is a Lebanese-American economist who specializes in econometrics. He is a Distinguished Professor of Economics in the Maxwell School of Citizenship and Public Affairs at Syracuse University, where he is also a senior research associate in the Center for Policy Research. He has published more than 200 articles, several of which are highly cited. He is also the part-time Chair of Economics at the University of Leicester. He is a co-editor-in-chief of Economics Letters and Empirical Economics.

== Education and career ==
Baltagi received his Ph.D. from the University of Pennsylvania in 1979. His previous positions include the George Summey Jr. Professor of Liberal Arts at Texas A&M University and Professor of Economics at the University of Houston. He has also been a visiting professor at the University of Arizona and the University of California, San Diego.

== Honors and awards ==
Baltagi has been a fellow of the IZA Institute of Labor Economics since 2002. In 2018, he was awarded the Kuwait Prize in Economics and Social Sciences by the Kuwait Foundation for the Advancement of Sciences.

== Selected publications ==
- Baltagi, Badi H. (1995) Econometric Analysis of Panel Data. John Wiley and Sons (who published) 1st to 5th editions as of 2021. 6th ed. Cham: Springer. https://doi.org/10.1007/978-3-030-53953-5.
