= Epstein–Zin preferences =

Specification in economics of recursive utility

In economics, Epstein–Zin preferences refers to a specification of recursive utility.

A recursive utility function can be constructed from two components,: a time aggregator that characterizes preferences in the absence of uncertainty and a risk aggregator that defines the certainty equivalent function that characterizes preferences over static gambles and is used to aggregate the risk associated with future utility. With Epstein–Zin preferences, the time aggregator is a linearly homogeneous CES aggregate of current consumption and the certainty equivalent of future utility. Specifically, the date-t utility index, $U_t$, for a sequence of positive scalar consumptions $\{c_t, c_{t+1}, c_{t+2}, ...\}$, that are potentially stochastic for time periods beyond date t, is defined recursively as the solution to the nonlinear stochastic difference equation

$$U_t = [ (1-\beta) c_t^\rho + \beta \mu_t(U_{t+1})^\rho ]^{1/\rho} ,$$

where $\mu_t( )$ is a real-valued certainty equivalent operator. The parameter $0<\beta<1$ determines the marginal rate of time preference, $1/\beta -1$, and the parameter $\rho<1$ determines the elasticity of intertemporal substitution, $1/(1-\rho)$. Epstein and Zin considered a variety of certainty equivalent operators, but a popular choice for both theoretical and empirical research has been $\mu_t(U_{t+1})=[E_t U_{t+1}^\alpha]^{1/\alpha}$, where $E_t$ denotes the expected value of $U_{t+1}$, conditional on information available to the planner in date t. The parameter $\alpha < 1$ encodes risk aversion, with smaller values of $\alpha$, other things equal, implying a stronger aversion to risk. The parameter restriction $\alpha=\rho$ results in a time-additive von Neumann–Morgenstern expected utility index.

Importantly, unlike von Neumann–Morgenstern utility functions (e.g. isoelastic utility), Epstein–Zin preferences allow the elasticity of intertemporal substitution (determined above by $\rho$) to be unrelated to risk aversion (determined above by $\alpha$).
