= Quantitative Economics =

- Discipline: Econometrics
- Language: English
- Edited by: Christopher Taber

Publication details
- History: 2010-present
- Publisher: Wiley-Blackwell
- Open access: Yes
- Impact factor: 1.42 (2017)

Standard abbreviations
- ISO 4: Quant. Econ.

Indexing
- ISSN: 1759-7323 (print); 1759-7331 (web)
- LCCN: 2011207423
- OCLC no.: 728740276

Links
- Journal homepage; Online access; Online archive

Quantitative Economics is a peer-reviewed open access academic journal covering econometrics. It is sponsored by the Econometric Society, was established in 2010, and is published by Wiley-Blackwell. The editor-in-chief is Christopher Taber (University of Wisconsin–Madison). According to the Journal Citation Reports, the journal has a 2017 impact factor of 1.42, ranking it 129th out of 353 journals in the category "Economics".
