= Economics Letters =

- Discipline: Economics
- Language: English
- Edited by: Badi H. Baltagi; Joao F. Gomes; Costas Meghir; Pierre-Daniel Sarte; Roberto Serrano

Publication details
- History: 1978–present
- Publisher: Elsevier (Netherlands)
- Frequency: Monthly
- Impact factor: 2.097 (2020)

Standard abbreviations
- ISO 4: Econ. Lett.
- MathSciNet: Econom. Lett.

Indexing
- CODEN: ECLEDS
- ISSN: 0165-1765
- LCCN: 85642356
- OCLC no.: 4596608

Links
- Journal homepage; Online access

Economics Letters is a scholarly peer-reviewed journal of economics that publishes concise communications (letters) that provide a means of rapid and efficient dissemination of new results, models and methods in all fields of economic research. Published by Elsevier.

The journal was established in 1978 and the current editors-in-chief are Badi H. Baltagi (Syracuse University), Joao F. Gomes (Wharton School of the University of Pennsylvania), Costas Meghir (Yale University), Pierre-Daniel Sarte, (Federal Reserve Bank of Richmond) and Roberto Serrano (Brown University). According to the Journal Citation Reports, the journal has a 2020 impact factor of 2.097.
