= Randall Wright =

Canadian economist

- Born: August 4, 1956 (age 70)

Academic background
- Education: University of Minnesota
- Doctoral advisor: Neil Wallace

Academic work
- Discipline: Macroeconomics
- School or tradition: New Monetarist Economics
- Institutions: Wisconsin School of Business
- Doctoral students: Paul J. Zak
- Notable ideas: Kiyotaki–Wright model Matching theory
- Website: Information at IDEAS / RePEc

Randall D. Wright (born August 4, 1956) is a Canadian academic macroeconomist who advanced the fields of monetary economics and labor economics through his role in the development of matching theory.

== Biography ==
Wright obtained a B.A. in economics from the University of Manitoba in 1979 and a Ph.D. in economics from the University of Minnesota in 1986. He was awarded an honorary M.A. by the University of Pennsylvania in 1990. His first position was as an assistant professor at Cornell University from 1984 to 1987. He then moved to the University of Pennsylvania, where he became a full professor in 1994, later becoming the James Joo-Jin Kim Professor of Economics. In 2009, Wright accepted a position in the economics department at University of Wisconsin–Madison. He is at the same time the Ray B. Zemon Chair in Liquid Assets in the Wisconsin School of Business' Department of Finance, Investment and Banking.

In addition to his academic position, Wright is a research associate at the Federal Reserve Bank of Cleveland, the Federal Reserve Bank of Philadelphia, the Bank of Canada, NBER, and Panthéon-Assas University. Wright was elected a fellow of the Econometric Society in 1997.

Wright was the editor of the International Economic Review in 1998–2008 and served on the Board of Editors of the American Economic Review in the period 1998–2000.

== Research contribution ==
Wright, together with co-author Nobuhiro Kiyotaki, pioneered the use of search theory in monetary economics. The application of search theory to macroeconomics would later be known as matching theory. Search-theoretic models of monetary exchange are based on explicit descriptions of the frictions that make money essential, which contrasts with earlier reduced form approaches to money in macroeconomics, such as putting money in the utility function or imposing cash-in-advance constraints. These earlier ways of modeling money's role did not show explicitly how it helps overcome informational, spatial, or temporal frictions. Search-theoretic models, on the other hand, are based on explicit descriptions of specialization, the pattern of meetings, and the information structure.

Kiyotaki and Wright (1989) was the first attempt to use a search-theoretic model to endogenously determine which commodities would become media of exchange, i.e. commodity money. Later, Kiyotaki and Wright (1991) constructed an alternative search-based model to prove that fiat money can be valued as a medium of exchange even if it has a rate of return that is inferior to other available assets. The application of these theories emerged in Kiyotaki and Wright (1993), when the authors developed a tractable model of the exchange process that captures the "double coincidence of wants problem" in a pure barter setup. In this model, the essential function of money is its role as a medium of exchange. The model can be used to address issues in monetary economics, such as the interaction between specialization and monetary exchange, and the possibility of equilibria with multiple fiat currencies.

A shortcoming of search-theoretic models of money is that these models becomes intractable without very strong assumptions, and are therefore impractical for the analysis of monetary policy. Wright and Ricardo Lagos (2005) attempt to overcome this shortcoming by proposing a more general, yet still tractable, framework for the analysis of monetary policy.

== Sources ==
- Nobuhiro Kiyotaki and Randall Wright (1989), "On Money as a Medium of Exchange," Journal of Political Economy, 97, 927–54.
- Nobuhiro Kiyotaki and Randall Wright (1991), "A Contribution to the Pure Theory of Money," Journal of Economic Theory, 53, 215–35.
- Nobuhiro Kiyotaki and Randall Wright (1993), "A search-theoretic approach to monetary economics," American Economic Review, 83 (1), 63–77.
- Ricardo Lagos and Randall Wright (2005), "A Unified Framework for Monetary Theory and Policy Analysis," Journal of Political Economy, 113, 463–84.
