= Institute for Fiscal Studies =

UK economic research institute

The Institute for Fiscal Studies

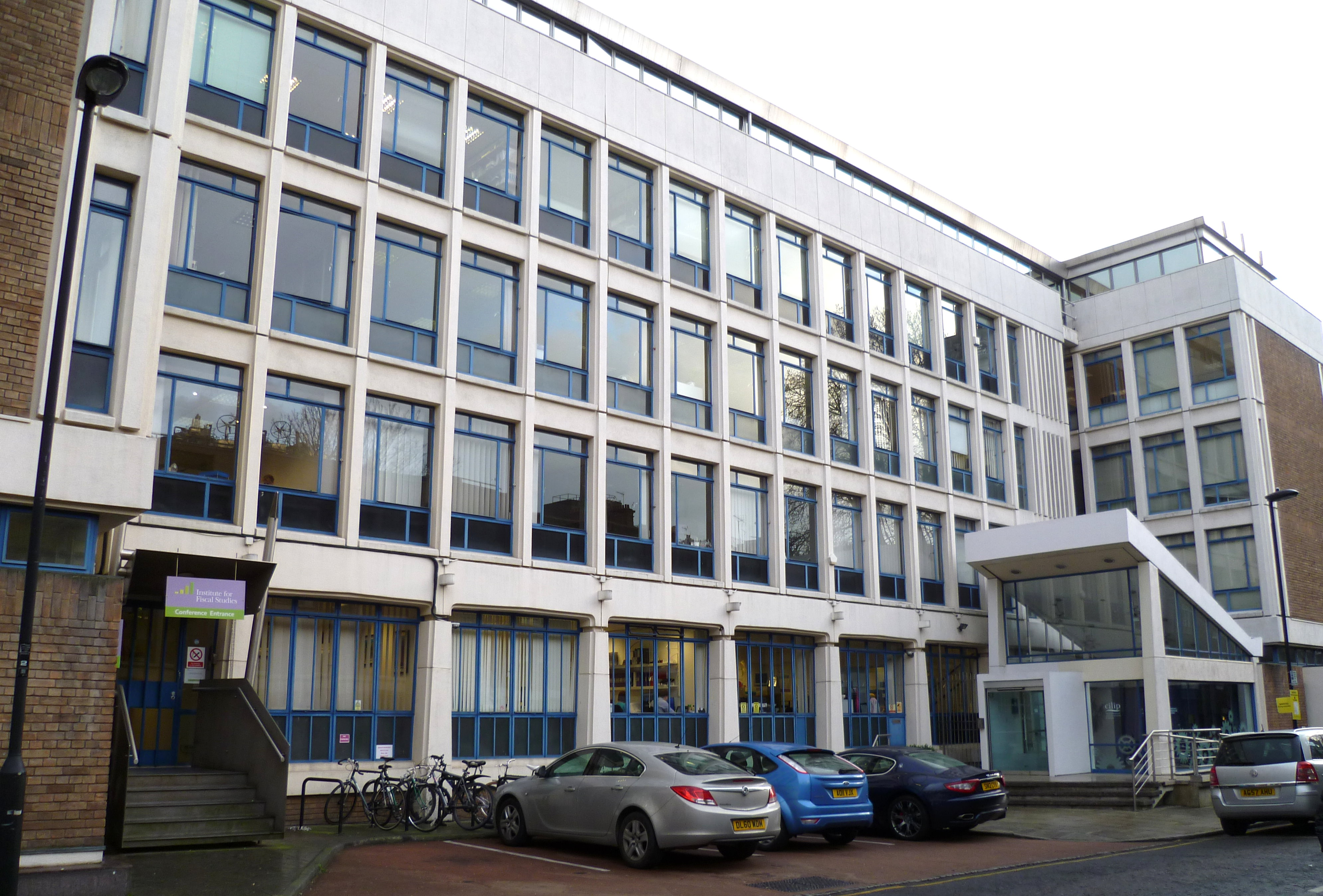
- Offices of the IFS in London
- Formation: 1969; 57 years ago
- Legal status: Non-profit company
- Purpose: To inform public debate on economics, via establishment of rigorous independent research, in order to promote the development of effective fiscal policy.
- Location: London, WC1
- Director: Helen Miller
- Main organ: IFS Council (President: Gus O'Donnell)
- Affiliations: Economic and Social Research Council (ESRC)
- Website: www.ifs.org.uk

The Institute for Fiscal Studies (IFS) is an independent economic research institute based in London, United Kingdom, which specialises in UK taxation and public policy. It produces both academic and policy-related findings.

The institute's stated aim is "to provide top quality economic analysis independent of government, political party or any other vested interest. Our goal is to promote effective economic and social policies by understanding better their impact on individuals, families, businesses and the government's finances."

Its offices are in the Bloomsbury area of Central London close to the British Museum and University College London.

== History ==
The institute was founded in response to the passing of the Finance Act 1965, by four financial professionals: a banker and later Conservative Party politician (Will Hopper), an investment trust manager (Bob Buist), a stockbroker (Nils Taube), and a tax consultant (John Chown). In 1964, the then Chancellor of the Exchequer James Callaghan had made a speech announcing his intentions to make changes to the tax system, including the introduction of a capital gains tax and a corporation tax. The group felt that the proposals were "half-baked". Nils Taube had commissioned John Chown to prepare a professional analysis of the speech and its effect on share prices. Chown described what he thought the impact of the proposals would be if implemented but also treated the exercise as a "reductio ad absurdum" and suggested that "the government and its advisers had three or four months for second thoughts and, recognising some of the dire consequences, would modify their original proposals." The chancellor did not change his mind. This led to further discussion among the group about their views on tax reform and the budget process. In Chown's words, the group wanted to ensure that "never again should a government, regardless of its political colour and intentions, introduce far-reaching tax legislation without the benefit of deep and thorough analysis of second- and third-order effects."

In 1967 a brainstorming weekend took place at The Bell, Aston Clinton. In the same year, the group published A Charter for the Taxpayer with proposals for tax changes in The Times, and Jeremy Skinner and Halmer Hudson joined the group. Will Hopper has stated that the idea of a research institute did not take shape until some time later at a dinner which was attended by Bob Buist, John Chown, Nils Taube and himself on 30 July 1968 at the Stella Alpina restaurant, 32 North Audley Street, London, at which a decision was made to found the institute. Will Hopper proposed the name 'Institute for Fiscal Studies'. 'Fiscal' was selected rather than just 'tax' "because we wished to include the other side of fisc. You cannot discuss the economic impact of taxation without looking at expenditure and the balance between the two." The institute was formally incorporated on 21 May 1969.

As well as research, the institute had wider, unspoken objectives. The founders did not just want to start an institute; they wanted to change British fiscal strategy. In particular, the group's declared aims were "to alter the climate of opinion within which changes to the British tax system were considered; to alter the procedures by which changes in the tax system were effected; and to help create a more rational tax system".

In 1970, Dick Taverne, then a Labour MP and a former Financial Secretary to the Treasury in the Wilson government, was approached to be the institute's first director. In 1971 a Council of the institute was formed, with President Sir Richard Powell (civil servant) and Vice-Presidents Roy Jenkins (Labour Party) and Selwyn Lloyd (Conservative Party). In the same year an Executive Committee was formed, with Will Hopper as Chairman, Halmer Hudson as Secretary and Buist, Chown, Skinner and Taube as Members. In 1972, the first full-time staff of the institute were appointed. In 1974, the institute moved from Bell Yard to Chandos Place. In 1975, the Meade Committee began its enquiries under the leadership of the later Nobel laureate James Meade. Simon Akam wrote in The Guardian in 2016: "Meade was assisted by two young economists: John Kay, who would go on to become director of the IFS, and Mervyn King, who would later become governor of the Bank of England." In 1978, the Meade Report was published and the institute moved to Castle Lane. In 1979, the Fiscal Studies publication was launched and the Working Paper series began. In 1980, the Armstrong Report was published. In 1982, the Report series was launched and the first Green Budget was issued. In 1984, The Reform of Social Security document was published by the institute. In 1985, the institute moved to Tottenham Court Road. In 1987, the Capital Taxes Group was established. In 1990, the institute moved to Ridgmount Street. In 1991, the ESRC Centre was inaugurated. In 1994, the Tax Law Review Committee was established.

== Research ==
Areas of research covered by the institute include public finance and spending, pensions and saving, company taxation, consumer behaviour and poverty and inequality. Although most of the institute's research is UK-focused, recent work has also looked at international development policies, for instance at education and nutrition programmes in Colombia. In October 2016, Professor Orazio Attanasio, the IFS' Research Director and Head of UCL Economics, won the Klaus J. Jacobs Research Prize for his work in the latter field.

The institute is home to – or a partner in – the following research centres (some of which are described further, in following sections):

- Centre for the Microeconomic Analysis of Public Policy (CPP)
- Centre for the Evaluation of Development Policies (EDePo)
- Tax Law Review Committee (TLRC)
- English Longitudinal Study of Ageing (ELSA)
- Centre for Microdata Methods and Practice (cemmap)
- Centre for Tax Analysis in Developing Countries (TaxDev)
- formerly Programme Evaluation for Policy Analysis (PEPA)

=== Centre for the Microeconomic Analysis of Public Policy ===
Since 1991 the institute has hosted an Economic and Social Research Council (ESRC) research centre, the Centre for the Microeconomic Analysis of Public Policy (CPP). The CPP has had Institute status since 2020. It is directed by Professor Imran Rasul, and co-directors Professor Richard Blundell, Professor James Banks, Professor Eric French, Professor Rachel Griffith and Professor Fabien Postel-Vinay.

The CPP carries out microeconomic analysis of major public policy issues, including productivity growth, poverty reduction, promoting employment and ensuring sound public finances. Its focus is on the modelling of individual, household and firm behaviour. Between 1991 and 2020, CPP was directed by Richard Blundell.

=== Centre for Microdata Methods and Practice ===
The institute hosts the Centre for Microdata Methods and Practice (Cemmap), a joint venture between the institute and the UCL Department of Economics. Cemmap's activities include:

- conducting research and organising conferences, symposia, workshops and training courses;
- developing and applying methods for modelling individual behaviour, the influences on it and the impact of policy interventions; and
- maintaining an extensive network of fellows in the UK and abroad.

Cemmap organises training courses and masterclasses and is home to a working paper series in the field of microeconometrics.

Cemmap was founded in 2000 with a grant from the Leverhulme Trust and since 2007 has been an ESRC research centre.

== Publications ==
The institute regularly publishes policy-reports and academic articles. It also produces a peer-reviewed quarterly journal, Fiscal Studies, which publishes articles submitted by a range of academics and practitioners in the field. The IFS Green Budget, which discusses policy issues which are likely to be relevant for the Chancellor of the Exchequer's annual budget statement, is published early each year.

Another noteworthy publication is the Mirrlees Review, which was published in September 2011. The review consists of two volumes. The first of these is a series of chapters covering different aspects of the UK tax system, accompanied by commentaries voicing different opinions. The second sets out the conclusions of the review. The review was chaired by Nobel laureate James Mirrlees and included contributions from IFS staff alongside prominent economists from various universities around the world.

== Criticism ==
The institute frequently speaks out on politically important issues. In October 2010, Deputy Prime Minister Nick Clegg accused the IFS of using methods that were "distorted and a complete nonsense", after it challenged government claims that tax and benefit reforms in the June 2010 Budget were "progressive".

Concern is sometimes expressed regarding the sources of the institute's funding. In October 2010 an Early Day Motion in Parliament pointed out that "95 per cent. of [its] 5.1 million funding comes from so-called research grant contracts, details of which are not itemised in its accounts; [...] that the vast majority of its official funding bodies are Government departments, the wider public sector, the European Commission and publicly-funded organisations, notably including the BBC, H M Treasury, the Department for Work and Pensions, the Government Equalities Office, the Department for International Development, the Department of Health, the Department for Business, Innovation and Skills, the Department for Education, the Department of Finance and Personnel for Northern Ireland, HM Revenue and Customs, the Food Standards Agency, the International Monetary Fund, the Low Pay Commission and the Office for National Statistics; [and] that the Institute for Fiscal Studies recently received a substantial part of its core funding from the Economic and Social Research Council, which is ultimately funded by the Department for Business, Innovation and Skills...".

In 2016, The Guardian said: "Some left-leaning economists look with particular scepticism on the claim that the IFS has no ideology, arguing that the institute holds an excessive faith in the power of market forces. The tax campaigner Richard Murphy said the IFS was 'embedded in all the normal, standard pro-market assumptions that dominate conventional economic thinking in the UK and elsewhere'." Murphy also said in a report about Value Added Tax (VAT) that the "Institute for Fiscal Studies is a body that persistently recommends tax increases that benefit the wealthiest in society at cost to those who make their living from work and the poorest in society."

In July 2011, The Spectator published an article that said that "'institutes' funded by research grants (which means, usually, tax money) will always argue for more expensive meddling by the state" and that the Institute for Fiscal Studies was "the most striking example" of this.

A week before the manifesto analysis for the 2019 UK general election was released, economist John Weeks commented that while the institute had no links to political groups, it had an inherent bias in its judgement criteria that "favour[ed] accounting balance over social outcome", saying that an IFS analysis cannot tell the public "whether a policy is a good idea, only whether the numbers add up."

== Directors and notable staff ==
The following have been directors of the IFS:

- Dick Taverne (1970–1979)
- John Kay (1979–1986)
- Bill Robinson (1986–1991)
- Andrew Dilnot (1991–2002)
- Robert Chote (2002–2010)
- Paul Johnson (2011–2025)
- Helen Miller (since 2025)

Former members of staff of the IFS include Evan Davis and Stephanie Flanders (journalists), Steve Webb (Liberal Democrat Pensions Minister) and Rupert Harrison (Chief of Staff to former Chancellor George Osborne).

== Funding ==
The Institute for Fiscal Studies receives funding from various sources, such as the Economic and Social Research Council, international organisations and other non-profit organisations.

It was rated as 'highly transparent' in its funding in 2018 by Transparify, and has been given an A grade for funding transparency by Who Funds You?.

== See also ==
- Taxation in the United Kingdom
- List of UK think tanks
