= Econometric Society =

Academic society of economists which publishes journals

The Econometric Society is an international society of academic economists interested in applying statistical tools in the practice of econometrics. It is an independent organization with no connections to societies of professional mathematicians or statisticians.The Econometric Society sponsors the economics academic journal Econometrica and publishes the journals Theoretical Economics and Quantitative Economics. It also produces a monograph series, organizes scientific meetings and interdisciplinary conferences, as well as workshops all over the world. It has a professional code of conduct.

As of 2014, there are about 700 elected fellows of the Econometric Society, making it one of the most prevalent research affiliations. New fellows are elected each year by the current fellows. The Econometric Society is made up of six regions worldwide.

== History ==
The Econometric Society was founded on December 29, 1930, at the Statler Hotel in Cleveland, Ohio. This meeting location was chosen because at the time there was also a meeting by the American Economic Association, the American Statistical Association, and the American Association for the Advancement of Science in the same location.

The sixteen-person founding meeting was chaired by Joseph Schumpeter. The sixteen founding members were Ragnar Frisch, Charles F. Roos, Joseph A. Schumpeter, Harold Hotelling, Henry Schultz, Karl Menger, Edwin B. Wilson, Frederick C. Mills, William F. Ogburn, J. Harvey Rogers, Malcolm C. Rorty, Carl Snyder, Walter A. Shewhart, Øystein Ore, Ingvar Wedervang and Norbert Wiener. Irving Fisher was elected first president of the society at the founding meeting.

The first annual meeting of the Econometric Society was in September 1931 in Lausanne, Switzerland. The Econometric Society was founded as a worldwide organization unlike other societies at the time.

== Meetings ==
The Econometric Society holds multiple meetings world-wide. Each of the six regions that compose the Econometric Society hold regional meetings. The North American and European regions have both held meetings since 1931. The Australasia region has held meetings since 1983. The Latin American region has held meetings since 1980. The Africa region has held meetings since 2014. The Asian region, which has been reorganized multiple times, has held meetings since 1987.

The Econometrics Society also has held a World Congress every five years since 1965. The World Congress is a conference of all the regional societies.

== Publications ==
The Econometric Society publishes three academic journals. The first is Econometrica, the second is Quantitative Economics, and the third is Theoretical Economics.

With funding from Alfred Cowles III, the Econometric Society first published Econometrica, an academic journal, in 1933. The papers presented in the first meeting of the Econometric Society were published in the first issue of Econometrica. This journal is still published today.

The Econometric Society created and developed the journal Quantitative Economics, which was first published in July 2010. Quantitative Economics is an open access journal.

The Econometric Society also publishes an open access journal named Theoretical Economics, which was acquired by the Economics Society in December of 2008, and was published under the Economic Society in January 2010.

== Officers ==
The Econometric Society is led by a president, who serves a one-year term. Election as a Fellow of the Econometric Society is considered by much of the economics profession to be an honor.

- List of presidents of the Econometric Society
- List of fellows of the Econometric Society

== Honorary lectures ==
The Econometrics Society awards five prizes. The Sonnenschein Service Prize (since 2024), Frisch Medal Award (since 1978), Arrow Prize (since 2024), the Haavelmo Prize (since 2024), and the Best Paper Award for Quantitative Economics and Theoretical Economics.

The Econometric Society sponsors several annual awards, in which the honored member delivers a lecture:

- Frisch Medal
- Walras–Bowley Lecture
- Fisher–Schultz Lecture
- Jacob Marschak Lecture
