= Robin Burgess =

British economist

FBA Robin Burgess
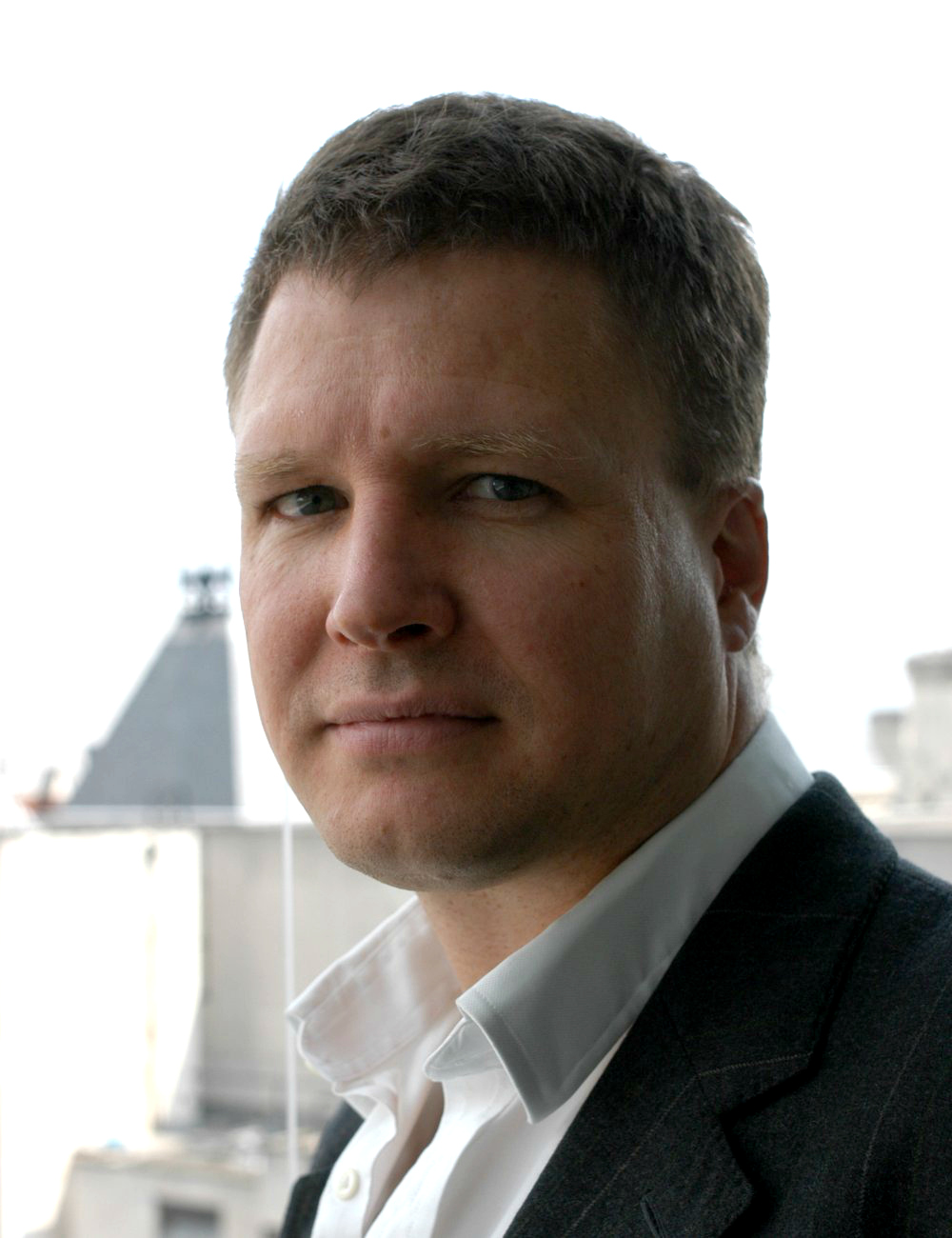
- Burgess in 2013
- Spouse: Bronwen Burgess
- Children: 2

Academic background
- Education: Oxford; LSE; Edinburgh

Academic work
- Discipline: Development economics Environmental economics Political economy
- Institutions: LSE (1998–present); NBER (2004–2010)
- Doctoral students: Dave Donaldson; Imran Rasul
- Website: www.robinburgess.com; Information at IDEAS / RePEc

Robin Burgess FBA is a British economist who is professor of economics, co-founder and director of the International Growth Centre, as well as co-founder and director of the Economics of Energy and the Environment (EEE) program at the London School of Economics and Political Science.

His areas of research interest include environmental economics, development economics and political economy. He has also worked in labour economics and public economics. He has published on a variety of topics, including natural disasters, mass media, rural banks, land reform, labour regulation, industrial policy, taxation, poverty and growth.

== Early life and education ==
Burgess holds the following degrees:

- BSc (Hons) Biological Sciences, University of Edinburgh, 1985
- MSc Economics, London School of Economics, 1988
- D.Phil Economics, University of Oxford, 1998

== Professional activities ==
Burgess currently serves as the director of the International Growth Centre. He has founded the Economics of Energy and the Environment (EEE) program at the LSE, serving as a platform to connect young and established researchers in environmental economics and to mainstream issues of environment, energy, and climate within economics and economic policy. He also serves as the current president of the Bureau for Research and Economic Analysis of Development (BREAD), on the editorial board of VoxDev, on the board of CEGA and is an affiliate of the Abdul Latif Jameel Poverty Action Lab (J-PAL) and Y-RISE, a research fellow in the CEPR and a Fellow of the British Academy. He is also a fellow of the European Economic Association.

== Research and selected publications ==
Robin Burgess' main research areas include:

- development economics
- political economy
- environmental economics

Below is a list of his main publications:

- "The Glittering Prizes: Career Incentives and Bureaucrat Performance." Marianne Bertrand, Robin Burgess, Arunish Chawla, and Guo Xu. 2020, In: The Review of Economic Studies, 87 (2): 626–655.
- "Tackling Youth Unemployment: Evidence from a Labour Market Experiment in Uganda." Livia Alfonsi, Oriana Bandiera, Vittorio Bassi, Robin Burgess, Imran Rasul, Munshi Sulaiman, and Anna Vitali. 2020, In: Econometrica, 88 (6): 2369–2414.
- "Labor Markets and Poverty in Village Economies." Oriana Bandiera, Robin Burgess, Narayan Das, Selim Gulesci, Imran Rasul, and Munshi Sulaiman. 2017, In: The Quarterly Journal of Economics, 132 (2): 811–870.
- "The Value of Democracy: Evidence from Road Building in Kenya." Robin Burgess, Remi Jedwab, Edward Miguel, Ameet Morjaria, and Gerard Padró i Miquel. 2015, In: American Economic Review, 105 (6): 1817–1851.
- "The Political Economy of Deforestation in the Tropics." Robin Burgess, Matthew Hansen, Benjamin A. Olken, Peter Potapov, and Stefanie Sieber. 2012, In: The Quarterly Journal of Economics, 127 (4): 1707–1754.
- "Can Openness Mitigate the Effects of Weather Shocks? Evidence from India’s Famine Era." Robin Burgess and Dave Donaldson. 2010, In: American Economic Review, 100 (2): 449–453.
- "The Unequal Effects of Liberalization: Evidence from Dismantling the License Raj in India." Philippe Aghion, Robin Burgess, Stephen Redding, and Fabrizio Zilibotti. 2008, In: American Economic Review, 98 (4): 1397–1412.
- "Do Rural Banks Matter? Evidence from the Indian Social Banking Experiment." Robin Burgess and Rohini Pande. 2005, In: American Economic Review, 95 (3): 780–795.
- "Can Labor Regulation Hinder Economic Performance? Evidence from India." Timothy Besley and Robin Burgess. 2004, In: The Quarterly Journal of Economics, 119 (1): 91–134.
- "Land Reform, Poverty Reduction, and Growth: Evidence from India." Timothy Besley and Robin Burgess. 2000, In: The Quarterly Journal of Economics, 115 (2): 389–430.
