= Tim Besley =

British academic economist

Sir Tim Besley CBE FBA
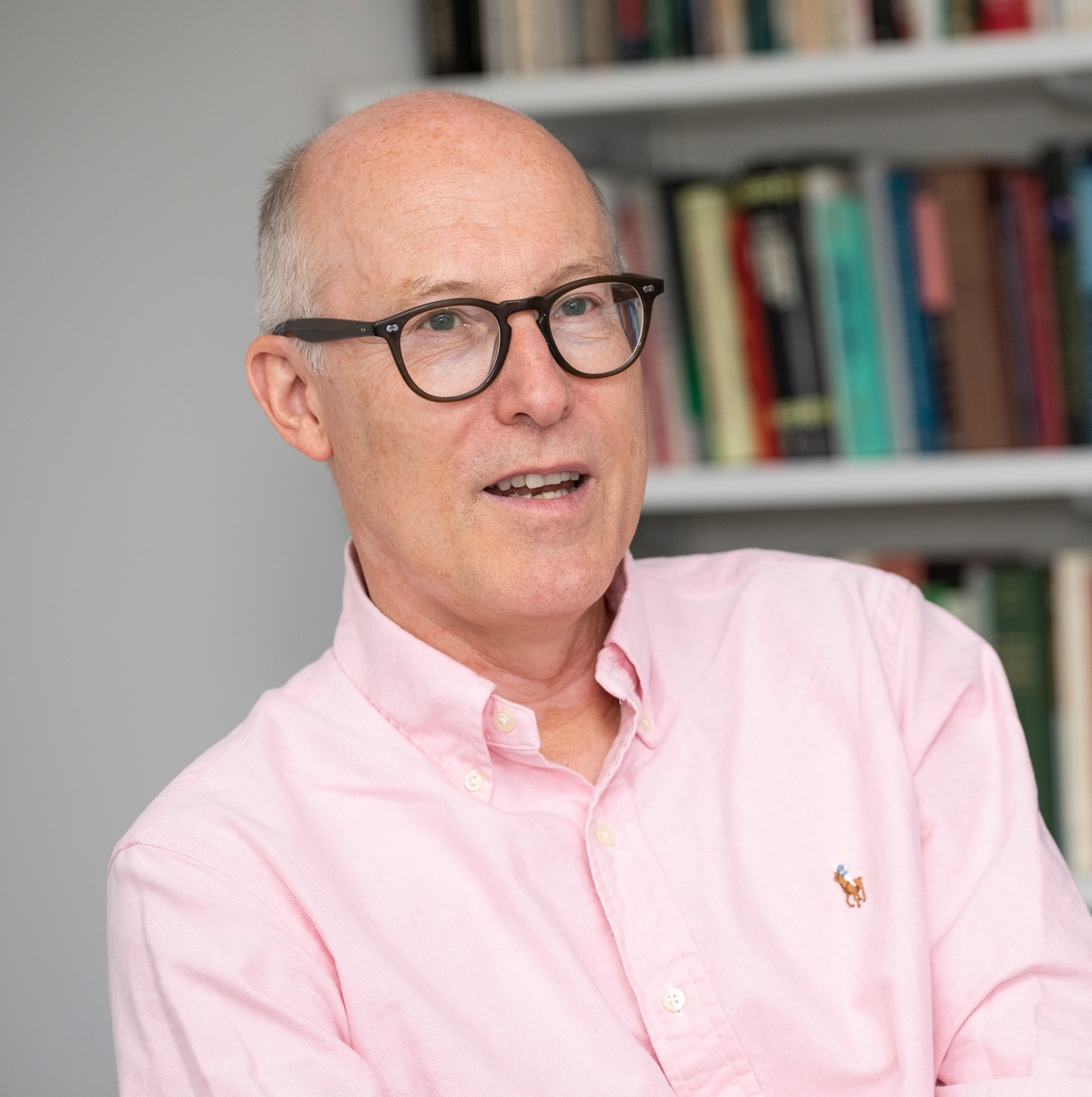
- Tim Besley in 2022
- Born: 14 September 1960 (age 66); Kesteven, Lincolnshire, England

Academic background
- Education: University of Oxford
- Doctoral advisor: W.M. Gorman
- Influences: Amartya Sen; James Mirrlees; James M. Buchanan

Academic work
- Discipline: Political economics
- Institutions: London School of Economics; Princeton University; All Souls College, Oxford
- Doctoral students: Rohini Pande; Dave Donaldson; Imran Rasul
- Notable ideas: Citizen-candidate model, Political Agency Models, Economics of State Capacity
- Awards: Yrjö Jahnsson Award (2005); John von Neumann Award (2010); BBVA Foundation Frontiers of Knowledge Award (2022)
- Website: Information at IDEAS / RePEc

Sir Timothy John Besley, CBE, FBA (born 14 September 1960) is a British economist who is the School Professor of Economics and Political Science and Sir W. Arthur Lewis Professor of Development Economics at the London School of Economics (LSE).

He is also a commissioner on the National Infrastructure Commission, a Quondam Fellow of All Souls College, Oxford since 2018, and has been the director of the Suntory and Toyota International Centres for Economic and Related Disciplines (STICERD) at the LSE. He has served as president of the European Economic Association, the International Economic Association and the Econometric Society. He has been an editor of the American Economic Review and is a co-editor of the Annual Review of Economics. From 2006 to 2009 he was an external member of the Bank of England's Monetary Policy Committee. Besley has won the 2005 Yrjö Jahnsson Award and the 2022 BBVA Foundation Frontiers of Knowledge Award among others.

== Early life and education ==
Born in Lincolnshire, Sir Tim Besley attended Aylesbury Grammar School and then studied at Oxford University, where he gained a BA in Philosophy, Politics, and Economics (PPE) with First Class Honours from Keble College, winning the George Webb Medley Prize for best exam performance in his cohort for his second and third years. He continued his graduate studies at Oxford, receiving an MPhil in economics with Distinction and the George Webb Medley Prize for the best MPhil performance in his cohort, followed by a DPhil in Economics upon election as an Examination Fellow of All Souls College in 1984.

== Career ==
Besley's first position was as an assistant professor in the economics department and Woodrow Wilson School of Public and International Affairs at Princeton University. He returned to the UK in 1995, becoming a Professor of Economics in the Department of Economics at LSE (1995-1997). He was a Professor of Economics and Political Science (1997-2007), followed by named professorships: as Kuwait Professor of Economics and Political Science (2007-2011), School Professor of Economics and Political Science (2012-ongoing), and W. Arthur Lewis Professor of Development Economics (2015-ongoing).

Besley served as the deputy director (1997-2000) and director (2000-2011) of the Suntory-Toyota International Centres for Economics and Related Disciplines (STICERD), being succeeded by Oriana Bandiera in 2012. He has been a member of the Steering Group for the International Growth Centre (IGC), a co-chair of the LSE Growth Commission and an academic director of IGC's Commission on State Fragility, Growth and Development.

Besley is a research fellow of the Centre for Economic Policy Research, and a former member of the Institutions, Organizations and Growth Programme of the Canadian Institute for Advanced Research (CIFAR). He is a past research fellow of the Institute for Fiscal Studies and was a member of the committee for the Mirrlees Review of the tax system. He was a member of the National Infrastructure Commission (NIC). When the NIC was superseded by the National Infrastructure and Service Transformation Authority (NISTA) in April 2025, Besley was appointed to the NISTA Council of Expert Advisors.

Besley served on the Bank of England's Monetary Policy Committee from September 2006 to August 2009. On the international level, Besley has served as a consultant to the World Bank and to the European Bank for Reconstruction and Development. In June 2021, he was appointed to the World Bank–International Monetary Fund High-Level Advisory Group (HLAG) on Sustainable and Inclusive Recovery and Growth, co-chaired by Mari Pangestu, Ceyla Pazarbasioglu, and Nicholas Stern.

== Research ==
Besley's research deals primarily with development economics, public economics and political economy, often with a policy focus. He studies economic policy formation in developed and emerging market economies. He has been a major influence in bringing the study of political economy back into mainstream economics.

Besley was the 2010 president of the European Economic Association. From 2014 to 2017, he served as president of the International Economic Association. In 2018, he was president of the Econometric Society.

From 1999–2004 he was a co-editor of American Economic Review – the first person to serve in this position not based at a US university. As of 2025, he became a co-editor of the Annual Review of Economics.

A selected bibliography includes:

- "Principled Agents: The Political Economy of Good Government", Oxford University Press, 2006.
- "Pillars of Prosperity: The Political Economics of Development Clusters", Princeton University Press, 2011 (with Torsten Persson).
- "Incumbent Behavior: Vote Seeking, Tax Setting and Yardstick Competition" (with Anne Case). American Economic Review, 85 (1), 25–45, 1995.
- "Property Rights and Investment Incentives: Theory and Evidence from Ghana", Journal of Political Economy, 103(5), 903–937, 1995.
- "An Economic Model of Representative Democracy" (with Stephen Coate), Quarterly Journal of Economics, 112(1), 85–114, 1997.
- "The Political Economy of Government Responsiveness: Theory and Evidence from India", (with Robin Burgess), Quarterly Journal of Economics, 117(4), 1415–1452, 2002.
- "Competition and Incentives with Motivated Agents", (with Maitreesh Ghatak), American Economic Review, 95(3), 616–636, 2005.
- "The Origins of State Capacity: Property Rights, Taxation and Politics", (with Torsten Persson) American Economic Review, 99(4), 1218–44, 2009.
- "The Logic of Political Violence", (with Torsten Persson) Quarterly Journal of Economics, 126 (3), 1411–1446, 2011.
- "State Capacity, Reciprocity and the Social Contract", Econometrica, 88(4) 1307–1335, 2020.
- "The Political Economics of Green Transitions", (with Torsten Persson) Quarterly Journal of Economics, 138 (3), 1863-1906, 2023.

== Honours and awards ==
Sir Tim Besley is a Fellow of the British Academy, and a fellow of the Econometric Society (2000). He is a foreign honorary member of the American Economic Association (2007) and the American Academy of Arts and Sciences (2011).

In 2005, he won the Yrjö Jahnsson Award along with Jordi Galí 'for their landmark contributions in development economics, public economics, and political economy, and for the development of the "New Keynesian" macroeconomics.'. He was awarded the 2010 John von Neumann Award by the Rajk László College for Advanced Studies at Corvinus University of Budapest.

Besley was appointed a Commander of the Order of the British Empire (CBE) in the 2010 Birthday Honours for services to Social Science, and a Knight Bachelor in the 2018 New Year Honours for services to Economics and Public Policy. For 2022 he was awarded the BBVA Foundation Frontiers of Knowledge Award.

== Personal life ==
Besley married political economist Gillian Paull in 1993; the couple has two sons. He lives in Barnes, in the London Borough of Richmond upon Thames.

== Works ==
- Principled agents?: the political economy of good government, Oxford University Press, 2006, ISBN 978-0-19-927150-4
- Delivering on the promise of pro-poor growth: insights and lessons from country experiences, Editors Timothy Besley, Louise Cord, World Bank Publications, 2007, ISBN 978-0-8213-6515-1
