= Eliana La Ferrara =

Italian economist

Eliana La Ferrara (born 1968) is an Italian economist and Professor of Public Policy at Harvard University's Kennedy School of Government. Before receiving tenure at Harvard in 2022, she held the Fondazione Romeo ed Enrica Invernizzi Chair in Development Economics at Bocconi University, where she also acted as Scientific Director of the Laboratory for Effective Anti-poverty Programs (LEAP). Previously, she was also the president of the Bureau for Research and Economic Analysis of Development (BREAD) as well as the president of the European Economic Association. In terms of research, her fields of interest include development economics, political economy, and public economics.

== Early life and education ==
La Ferrara was born in Mistretta in 1968. She earned a Laurea in economics and social sciences as well as a research doctorate in economics from Bocconi University in 1993 and 1997, respectively. Thereafter, she also earned a PhD from Harvard University in 1999.

== Career ==
Since 1998, La Ferrara has mostly worked at Bocconi University, where she currently holds the Fondazone Romeo ed Enrica Invernizzi Chair in Development Economics and acts as Scientific Director of the Laboratory for Effective Anti-Poverty Policies. Additionally, she has held various visiting appointments at the University of Namur (2006), the University of Oslo (2012,2013), and MIT (2012–13), and was the BP Centennial Professor at the London School of Economics in 2017–18.

In terms of professional affiliations, La Ferrara is the director of the Scientific Director of the Laboratory for Effective AntiPoverty Policies (LEAP). From 2016 to 2019 she was the president of the Bureau for Research and Economic Analysis of Development (BREAD). In 2018 she was president of the European Economic Association (EEA). She is also a member of the executive committee of the European Development Research Network (EUDN), and a co-director of the State research programme at the International Growth Centre (IGC). Furthermore, she is also affiliated with the Innocenzo Gasparini Institute for Economic Research (IGIER), CPER, the Econometric Society, and the Abdul Latif Jameel Poverty Action Lab (J-PAL) at MIT. In 2021, she was appointed to the World Bank–International Monetary Fund High-Level Advisory Group (HLAG) on Sustainable and Inclusive Recovery and Growth, co-chaired by Mari Pangestu, Ceyla Pazarbasioglu, and Nicholas Stern.

In addition, La Ferrara performs editorial duties at Economica, the Journal of African Economies, and World Development. She also functions as a referee for several economic journals, such as the American Economic Review or the Quarterly Journal of Economics. She also served on the Social Sciences Jury for the Infosys Prize 2020. She was elected fellow of the American Academy of Arts and Sciences in 2019.

== Research ==
Her research focuses on the economics of institutions, social norms, media, conflict and ethnicity. According to IDEAS/RePEc, she belongs to the 2% of most cited economists. Key areas of her research include the following:

=== Research on the economics of ethnic diversity and economic inequality ===
One major strand of La Ferrara's research studies how differences in terms of income or ethnicity between members of a community (i.e. the community's heterogeneity) affects the formation of groups, participation in social activities, and trust in others.

Investigating the effect of heterogeneity on group formation and participation in social activities in US communities, La Ferrara and Alberto Alesina found that social participation is lower the more unequal and ethnically diverse a community is. Moreover, individuals who oppose racial mixing tend to be increasingly isolated the more racially diverse their community is. Despite very different standards of living, the effect of income inequality seems also to hold in developing countries: in rural Tanzania, La Ferrara found that village-level inequality overall decreases participation in groups, especially for relatively wealthy people. However, she also found that this aggregate effect masks the importance of whether access to groups is open or restricted: if the growth in inequality is mostly due to some of the very poor becoming slightly wealthier, participation in open groups decreases, but if the growth in inequality is instead driven by average income earners becoming relatively wealthy participation in groups with restricted access increases, with both processes affecting group functioning. One channel through which a community's diversity affects its social life is through the trust (or lack thereof) between its members. In the U.S., La Ferrara and Alesina find that low trust of others is pervasive among individuals who (i) live in a racially mixed and/or highly unequal community, (ii) are members in a group that has historically been discriminated against (e.g. African Americans and, to a lesser degree, women), (iii) are unsuccessful in terms of income and education, and/or (iv) recently had a series of traumatic experiences; by contrast, religious beliefs or ethnic origins don't affect trust of others.

=== Research on the relationship between violent conflict and financial markets ===
In another strand of her research, Eliana La Ferrara studies the relationship between violent conflict and financial markets; examples therein include the development of a method to detect illegal arms trade, the analysis of whether violent conflict is bad for private firms, and financial markets' reaction to the news of violent conflict:

In their research on illegal arms trade, Eliana La Ferrara and Stefano DellaVigna speculate that events that affect the intensity of violent conflicts (and, by extension, the demand for arms) in countries which are under international arms embargoes may be reflected in arms manufacturers' stock prices if they are violating these embargoes. Investigating this hypothesis, they show that the stock returns of arms manufacturers headquartered in highly corrupt countries with an intransparent arms trade business indeed mirror these events and are able to substantiate many of these links through UN investigations and online news stories. In another study on the relationship between violent conflicts and financial markets, La Ferrara and Massimo Guidolin exploit the sudden, unexpected end of the Angolan Civil War in 2002 (due to the death of UNITA rebel leader Jonas Savimbi) to assess the effect of the conflict in diamond-rich Angola on private firms. In particular La Ferrara and Guidolin find that the event caused the abnormal returns of diamond mining firms holding concessions in Angola to decrease by 4pp but had no effect on diamond mining companies not active in Angola. In light of this finding, they suggest that violent conflict may benefit incumbent firms in the extractive sector by creating additional barriers to market entry, weakening governments' bargaining power with regard to the distribution of natural resource rents, and making the licensing of mining concessions less transparent. Finally, in another study taking a global perspective, La Ferrara and Guidolin find that for 101 violent conflicts during 1974–2004, MSCI stock indices of the U.S., British, and French stock markets, overall commodity indices (though not for oil futures, agricultural products or gold), and the U.S. dollar exchange rate tend, on average, to react positively to the news of conflict onset, whereas stock markets in Japan as well as indices of agricultural commodities, oil futures and gold don't. In general, stock markets are found to react particularly strongly to news of international conflicts as well as to news of conflicts in Asia and the Middle East, the latter being driven by the extremely strong (and mostly negative) reactions of oil futures.

=== Research on the impact of television on social norms in Brazil ===
A third strand of La Ferrara's research addresses the "export" of alternative social norms through the expansion of access to modern media, e.g. television. Together with Alberto Chong, Eliana La Ferrara exploits the gradual expansion of the television network Rede Globo across Brazil in the 1970s and 1980s to explore whether exposure to Rede Globo telenovelas, which tend to portray modern social norms (including the possibility of divorce) had an effect on divorces. Indeed, La Ferrara and Chong find that the availability of the Globo signal significantly increases the share of separated or divorced couples. In another study but again exploiting Rede Globo's gradual expansion in Brazil, La Ferrara, Chong and Suzanne Duryea analyse the impact of Globo's telenovelas, which also portray comparatively small families, on fertility and find a significant negative impact, with the effect of Globo's telenovelas on parents being further substantiated by the fact that the frequency of child names in regions with access to Globo strongly reflects naming patterns in the telenovelas. The effect of the soap operas on fertility is particularly strong for women from poor households and during the central and late phases of fertility, thus suggesting that households adjusted their views regarding the desired number of children and stopped having more children after reaching it.

=== Research on reciprocity and attitudes towards redistribution ===
Further work In her study of informal credit transactions within kinship based networks in Ghana, La Ferrara finds that repayment of loans is effectively induced through social enforcement, e.g. the sanctioning of defaulters' offspring, and that kin members sometimes adjust their lending behaviour (e.g. offering favourable terms of credit) on the characteristics of a creditor's parents in the expectation of reciprocity, i.e. that others will do the same with their offspring. Alesina and La Ferrara find that preferences for redistribution in the U.S. depend considerably on individuals' expected gains and losses from redistribution (which are strongly determined by their socioeconomic background) but also by their subjective beliefs about individual economic agency, i.e. people who don't believe that American society offers "equal opportunities" for social mobility are less averse to redistribution.

== Selected publications ==
- Harari, M., La Ferrara, E. (2018). Conflict, Climate and Cells: A Disaggregated Analysis. Review of Economics and Statistics, 100(4), pp. 594-608.
- Bossert, W., D’Ambrosio, C., La Ferrara, E. (2011). A Generalized Index of Fractionalization. Economica, 78(312), pp. 723-750.
- Alesina, A., La Ferrara, E. (2005). Ethnic Diversity and Economic Performance. Journal of Economic Literature, 43(3), pp. 762–800.
- La Ferrara E. (2003). Kin Groups and Reciprocity: A Model of Credit Transactions in Ghana. American Economic Review, 93(5), pp. 1730-1751.
- Alesina, A., La Ferrara, E. (2000). Participation in Heterogeneous Communities. The Quarterly Journal of Economics, 115, pp. 847-904.
