= Nava Ashraf =

Canadian economist

Nava Ashraf, FBA is a Canadian economist and academic. She is Professor of Economics at the London School of Economics, as well as research director of the Marshall Institute for Philanthropy and Social Entrepreneurship. Her research interests include development economics, behavioral economics, and family economics.

== Biography ==
Ashraf earned a B.A. in economics from Stanford University in 1998, and an M.A. and Ph.D. in economics from Harvard University in 2003 and 2005, respectively. After her studies, she began working at Harvard Business School in the Negotiation, Organizations and Markets Unit as assistant professor (2005–10) and later as associate professor (2010–16). Since 2016 Ashraf has been a professor at the London School of Economics. Ashraf maintains affiliations with the CEPR, J-PAL, and BREAD, in particular as research director of the Marshall Institute for Philanthropy and Social Entrepreneurship and co-director of the psychology and economics programme within the Suntory and Toyota International Centres for Economics and Related Disciplines (STICERD). She is also an editor of Economica and a referee for numerous academic journals in economics. She is a Fellow of the European Economic Association.

== Research ==
Ashraf's research focuses on development economics, behavioral economics, and family economics. Findings of her research include:

- Commitment savings accounts (i.e. accounts that restrict access to savings for a pre-specified period) may be attractive to women (but not men) displaying hyperbolic discounting and are partly effective in increasing their saving rates (with Dean Karlan and Wesley Yin);
- Spouses' contributions to their household's income depend on which spouse controls the household's saving and spending and on whether information about spouses' incomes is private;
- Most of the (surprisingly small) variance in trust between trust games and dictator games played in Russia, South Africa, and the United States can be explained by reciprocity expectations, with a smaller role for unconditional kindness, while variance in trustworthiness is mainly explained by unconditional kindness (with Iris Bohnet and Nikita Piankov);
- Women (in Zambia) who are given concealable contraceptives in their husbands' presence are 19% less likely to seek family planning services, 25% less likely to use the contraceptives, and 17% more likely to give birth (with Erica Field and Jean Lee);
- Higher prices may stimulate the use of health products, e.g. home water purification solutions, in developing countries due to a screening effect (only households that expect to use the product frequently buy it) but probably not because of psychological sunk cost effects (with James Berry and Jesse M. Shapiro).

== Awards ==
- Rising Star in Global Health (by Grand Challenges Canada and the Gates Foundation: 2012
- TIAA-CREF Paul. A Samuelson Award Certificate of Excellence (for Tying Odysseus to the Mast: Evidence from a Commitment Savings Product in the Philippines with Dean Karlan and Wesley Yin): 2006
- Queen Elizabeth II Golden Jubilee Medal for Service: 2003
- Order of British Columbia: 1995
- In 2024, she was elected a Fellow of the British Academy (FBA), the United Kingdom's national academy for the humanities and social sciences.
