= Lars E. O. Svensson =

Swedish economist

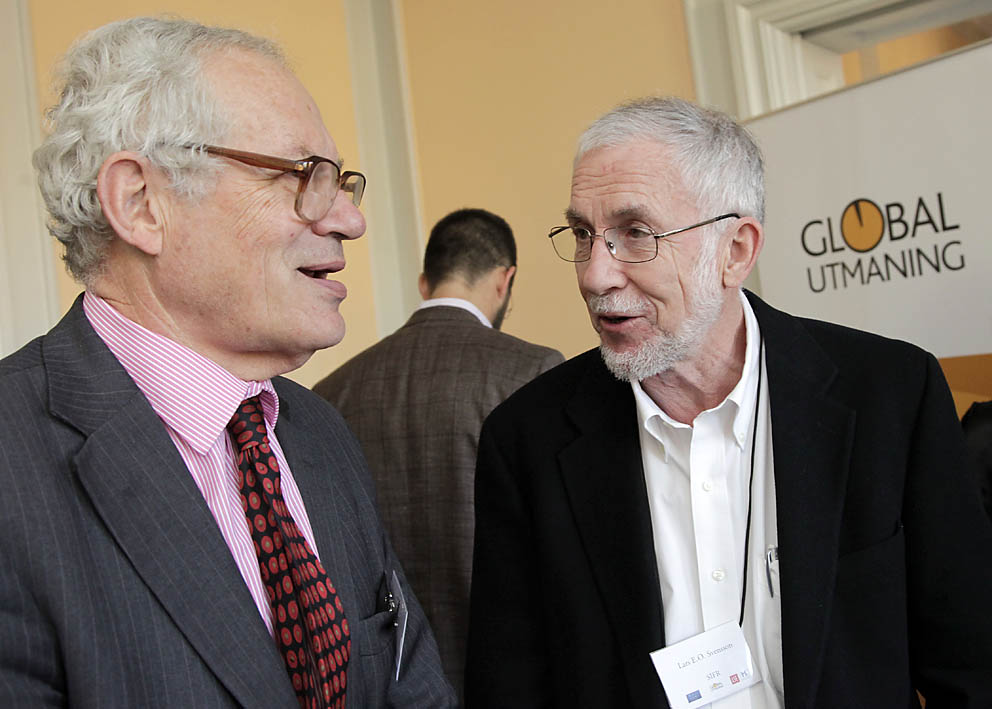
- Charles Goodhart and Lars E.O. Svensson
- Born: November 18, 1947 (age 78)

Academic background
- Education: Stockholm University; Royal Institute of Technology
- Doctoral advisor: Lars Werin

Academic work
- Discipline: monetary economics monetary policy international finance
- Institutions: Stockholm School of Economics
- Doctoral students: Torsten Persson
- Website: Information at IDEAS / RePEc

Lars Erik Oscar Svensson, is a Swedish economist. He was on the faculty of Princeton University 2001–2009. Since June 2014, he is Affiliated Professor at the Stockholm School of Economics. Since 2009 he is Affiliated Professor at Stockholm University. He has published significant research in macroeconomics, especially monetary economics, international trade and general equilibrium theory. He is among the most influential economists in the world according to IDEAS/RePEc. He is a well-known proponent of price path targeting, a topic on which he published significant research.

During 2007–2013 he was a deputy governor of the Sveriges Riksbank (the central bank of Sweden). From 2009 he dissented and advocated a more expansionary monetary policy for Sweden, since the unemployment rate was high and inflation fell far below the Riksbank's inflation target. He is also notable for advocating a slightly negative interest rate among central banks at the Riksbank in July 2009.

== Early life and education ==
Svensson earned his M.S. in mathematics in 1971 from the School of Applied Mathematics at the Royal Institute of Technology in Stockholm and his B.A. in economics, economic history and mathematics in 1973 at the Stockholm University. After studying as a Special Graduate Student in economics at the Massachusetts Institute of Technology in 1974–75, he received his Ph.D. from the Stockholm University in 1976.

== Career ==
Between 1975 and 1984 Svensson was a Research Fellow of the Institute for International Economic Studies at the Stockholm University and, until 2001, he was a professor of international economics at the same institute. During 2001–2009 he was a professor of economics at Princeton University. Before joining the Sveriges Riksbank as a deputy governor, in 2007, for a six-year term period, he acted as an advisor for many organizations, including the World Bank, the Federal Reserve Bank of New York and the Reserve Bank of New Zealand. He left the Riksbank in 2013. From 2009 he is an affiliated professor at the Institute for International Economic Studies, Stockholm University. Svensson was the recipient of the Great Gold Medal of the Royal Swedish Academy of Engineering Sciences in 2012.

He is a member of the Royal Swedish Academy of Sciences since 1989, a fellow of the Econometric Society and a fellow of the European Economic Association.

== Other activities ==
- European Systemic Risk Board (ESRB), Member of the Advisory Scientific Committee since April 2019
