= Mary Jo Bane =

American political scientist

- Spouse: Kenneth Winston

Academic background
- Education: B.A., School of Foreign Service; Harvard University Graduate School of Education
- Thesis: The Effects of Structure: A Study of First Grade Children in Open and Traditional Classrooms (1972)

Academic work
- Institutions: John F. Kennedy School of Government

Mary Jo Bane is an American political scientist who focuses on children and welfare. She is currently the Thornton Bradshaw Professor at Harvard Kennedy School, and formerly the Malcolm Wiener Professor of Social Policy and Director of the Malcolm Wiener Center for Social Policy.

== Early life and education ==
Bane was born into a Catholic family. While attending Georgetown University, she campaigned for Senator John F. Kennedy's presidential election. She became inspired by his foreign affairs platform and joined the Peace Corps, where she taught schoolchildren in Liberia.

== Career ==
Bane joined the faculty at the John F. Kennedy School of Government in 1981, where she would become the first woman to gain tenure at the Kennedy School. From 1987 until 1992, Bane served as director of the Malcolm Wiener Center for Social Policy. The next year, Bane worked as commissioner of the New York State Department of Social Services and an assistant secretary for children and families at the U.S. Department of Health and Human Services until 1996. A few years later, Bane was elected a 2003 American Academy of Political and Social Science Fellow.

A few years later, Bane was elected the Harvard's Kennedy School of Government Academic Dean, replacing Stephen M. Walt. She stayed in this role from 2006 until 2011, when she was succeeded by Iris Bohnet.

Bane is a Fellow of the National Academy of Public Administration.

== Selected publications ==
- Here to stay : American families in the twentieth century, 1976
- Welfare realities : from rhetoric to reform, 1994
- Lifting up the poor : a dialogue on religion, poverty & welfare reform, 2003
- Taking faith seriously, 2005
