= Francesco Caselli =

Economist

- Born: 14 October 1966 (age 59)

Academic background
- Education: Harvard University; University of Bologna
- Website: Information at IDEAS / RePEc

Francesco Caselli (born 14 October 1966) is the Norman Sosnow Professor of Economics and the Head of the Department of Economics at the London School of Economics (LSE). His work includes contributions to the understanding convergence and cross-country income differentials.

== Biography ==
Caselli got his Laurea in Economics and Commerce from the University of Bologna in 1991 and his PhD in Economics at Harvard University in 1997. He was an assistant professor of economics at the University of Chicago Graduate School of Business from 1997 to 2000, and moved to Harvard in 2000, where he was the Paul Sack Associate Professor of Political Economy from 2002 to 2005. He then moved to the LSE. He was the Managing Editor of The Review of Economic Studies from 2010 to 2014, and currently co-editor of Economica. He is the author of the book Technology Differences over Space and Time.

He was elected Fellow of the British Academy in 2010. He is also a fellow of the Econometric Society (2019) and the European Economic Association.
