= Ingvild Almås =

Norwegian professor and economist

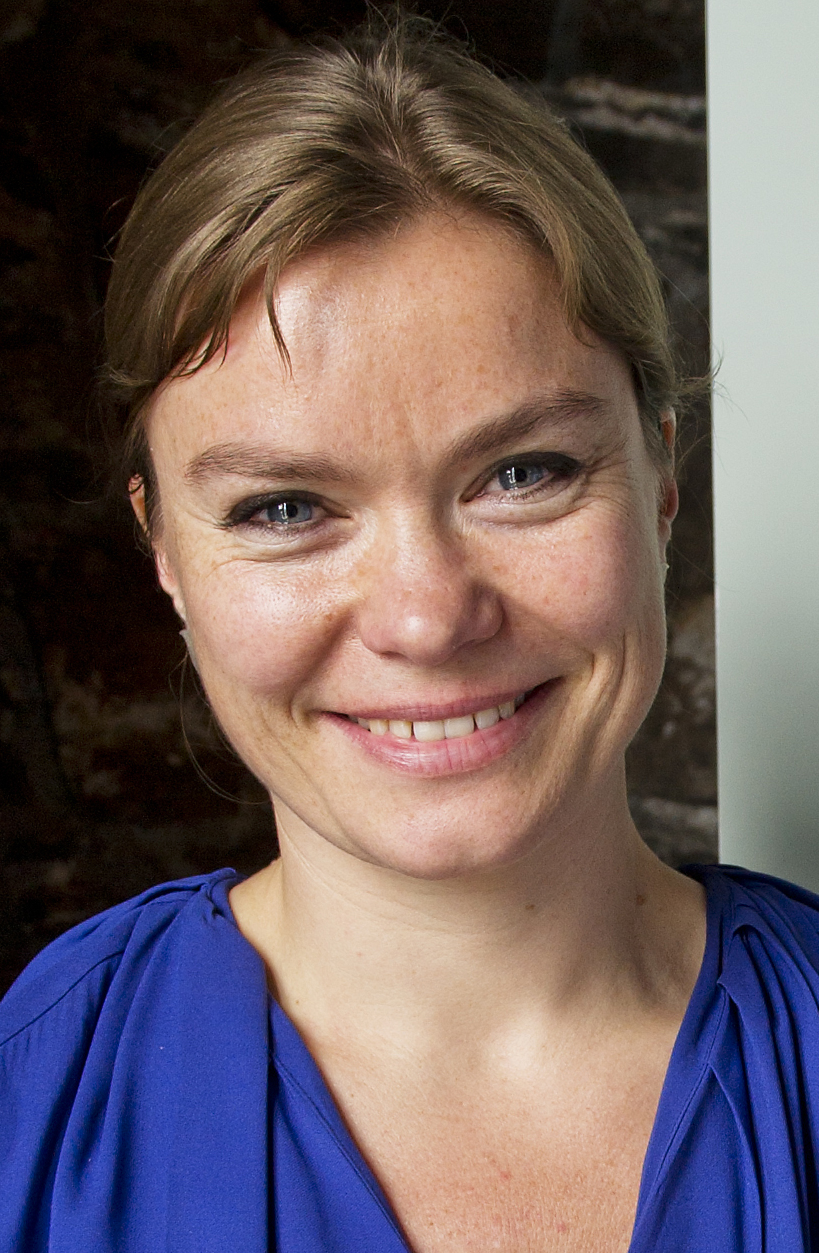
Ingvild Almås winner of the Nils Klim prize

Ingvild Almås (born 10 March, 1978) is a professor of economics at the Institute for International Economic Studies (IIES) at Stockholm University. She is also an external member of the new committee on monetary policy and financial stability in Norges Bank, the central bank of Norway.

Almås obtained her PhD from the Norwegian School of Economics in 2008 with a thesis on economic inequalities for which she received Norges Bank's award for best PhD thesis in macroeconomics.

Almås' research is mainly focused on gaining a better understanding of economic inequalities and has been published in journals such as the American Economic Review and the Journal of Political Economy. She was elected fellow of the European Economic Association in 2021.
