= Fabrizio Zilibotti =

Italian economist

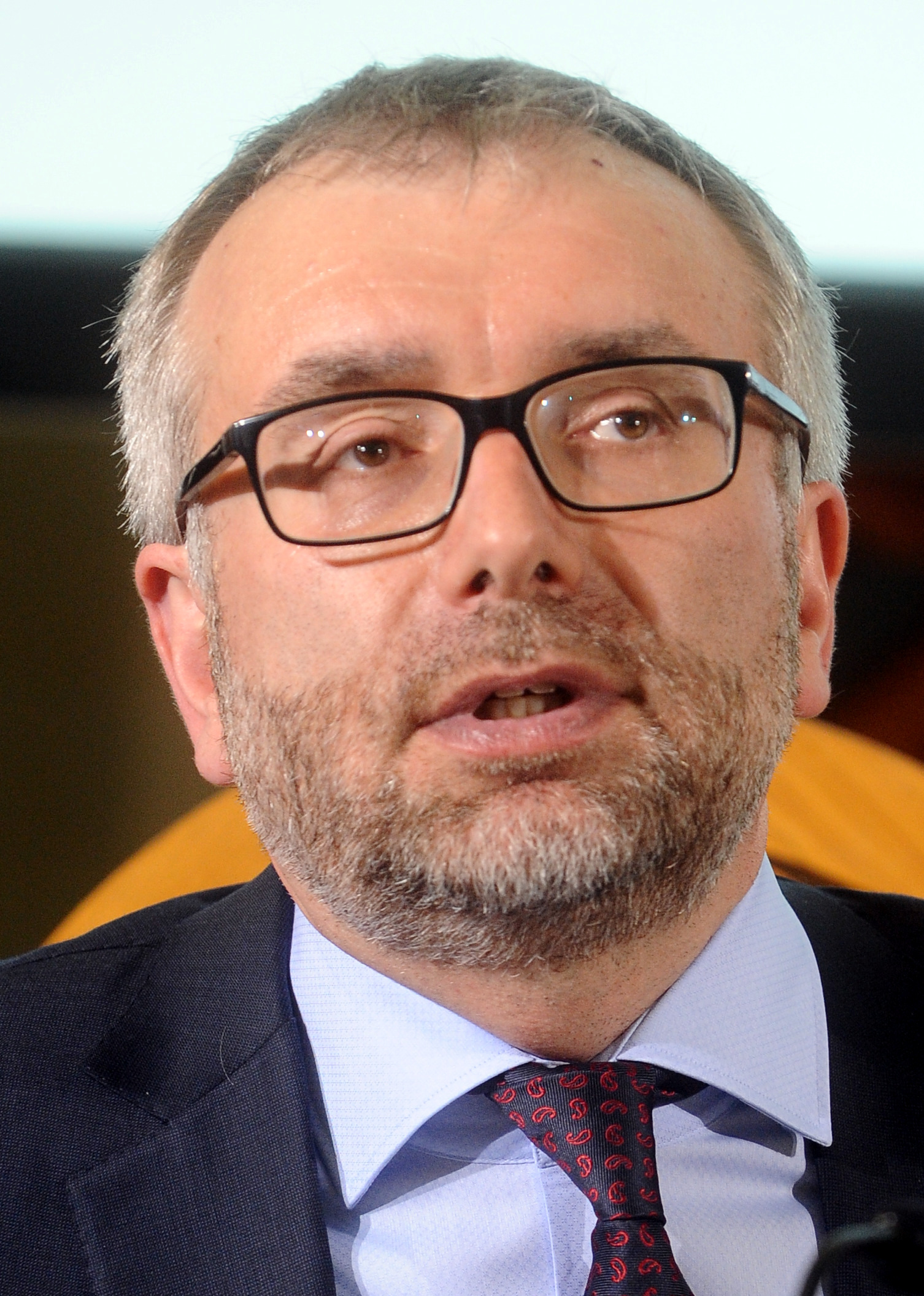
- Born: September 7, 1964 (age 62); Bologna, Italy

Academic background
- Education: London School of Economics (Ph.D., 1994; M.Sc., 1991); Yale University (honorary M.A. privatim, 2018); University of Bologna (Laurea cum laude, 1989)
- Doctoral advisor: Charlie Bean

Academic work
- Discipline: Macroeconomics; Political economics; Economic growth
- Institutions: Yale University
- Awards: Yrjö Jahnsson Award (2009); Ciliegia d'Oro (2009); Sun Yefang Award (2012
- Website: Information at IDEAS / RePEc

Fabrizio Zilibotti (born September 7, 1964) is an Italian economist. He is the Tuntex Professor of International and Development Economics at Yale University. Zilibotti was previously professor of economics at University College London, the University of Zürich, and at the Institute for International Economic Studies in Stockholm.

He has been a co-editor of Econometrica, managing editor of the Review of Economic Studies (2002-2006), and chief editor of the Journal of the European Economic Association (2009-2014). In addition, he is an associate editor of the Journal of Economic Growth and of China Economic Review. He is a fellow of the Econometric Society, of the NBER and of the CEPR, and a member of the Academia Europaea honoris causa. In 2016, Zilibotti was the president of the European Economic Association.

== Early life and education ==
Zilibotti earned a Laurea in Political Science at the Università di Bologna (1989), and a Master of Science (1991) and a Ph.D. (1994) of economics at the London School of Economics. His doctoral thesis was titled "Endogenous growth and underdevelopment traps: A theoretical and empirical analysis."

His academic career includes professorships at European universities such as Universitat Pompeu Fabra, University College London, and the IIES-Stockholm University. He has also held visiting positions at Bocconi University (“Tommaso Padoa-Schioppa Visiting Professorship”), Tsinghua University (“Mr. and Mrs. Tien Oung Liu Distinguished Visiting Professorship”) and the Universities of Oslo, Bologna, Southampton, and CERGE-EI Prague. His most recent appointment was a chair at the University of Zurich.

== Selected publications ==
His research interests include economic growth and development, the economic development of China, political economy, macroeconomics, international economics, and economics and culture.

- Fan, Tianyu; Peters, Michael; Zilibotti, Fabrizio (2023). "Growing Like India: the Unequal Effects of Service-Led Growth". Econometrica. 91 (4): 1457–1494. doi:10.3982/ECTA20964. hdl:10419/283231.
- Agostinelli, Francesco; Doepke, Matthias; Sorrenti, Giuseppe; Zilibotti, Fabrizio (2022). "When the great equalizer shuts down: Schools, peers, and parents in pandemic times". Journal of Public Economics. 90 (4): 1615–1654. doi:10.1016/j.jpubeco.2021.104574. PMC 8735857. PMID 35017763.
- Koenig, Michael; Song, Zheng; Storesletten, Kjetil; Zilibotti, Fabrizio (2022). "From Imitation to Innovation: Where Is All That Chinese R&D Going?". Econometrica. 206 (4): 1615–1654. doi:10.3982/ECTA18586. hdl:1871.1/734ab287-9ba7-4acb-992c-e2f2887a9d67.
- Mueller, Andreas; Storesletten, Kjetil; Zilibotti, Fabrizio (2019). "Sovereign Debt and Structural Reforms". American Economic Review. 109 (12): 4220–59. doi:10.1257/aer.20161457. hdl:10230/28283. S2CID 3401813.
- Doepke, Matthias; Zilibotti, Fabrizio (2017). "Parenting with Style: Altruism and Paternalism in Intergenerational Preference Transmission" (PDF). Econometrica. 85 (5): 1331–1371. doi:10.3982/ECTA14634. S2CID 17160719.
- Koenig, Michael; Rohner, Dominic; Thoenig, Mathias; Zilibotti, Fabrizio (2017). "Networks in Conflict: Theory and Evidence from the Great War of Africa". Econometrica. 85 (4): 1093–1132. doi:10.3982/ECTA13117. hdl:10419/197784.
- Zilibotti, Fabrizio (2017). "Growing and Slowing Down Like China". Journal of the European Economic Association. 15 (5): 943–988. doi:10.1093/jeea/jvx018.
- Koenig, Michael; Lorenz, Jan; Zilibotti, Fabrizio (2016). "Innovation vs. Imitation and the Evolution of Productivity Distribution". Theoretical Economics. 11 (3): 1053–1102. doi:10.3982/TE1437. hdl:10419/150301.
- Song, Zheng; Storesletten, Kjetil; Wang, Yikai; Zilibotti, Fabrizio (2015). "Sharing High Growth across Generations: Pensions and Demographic Transition in China" (PDF). American Economic Journal: Macroeconomics. 7 (2): 1–39. doi:10.1257/mac.20130322. hdl:10852/43558. S2CID 5178747.
- Rohner, Dominic; Thoenig, Mathias; Zilibotti, Fabrizio (2013). "War Signals: A Theory of Trade, Trust, and Conflict". Review of Economic Studies. 80 (3): 1114–1147. doi:10.1093/restud/rdt003.
- Song, Zheng; Storesletten, Kjetil; Zilibotti, Fabrizio (2012). "Rotten Parents and Disciplined Children: A Politico-Economic Theory of Public Expenditure and Debt". Econometrica. 80 (6): 2785–2803. doi:10.3982/ECTA8910.
- Song, Zheng; Storesletten, Kjetil; Zilibotti, Fabrizio (2011). "Growing Like China" (PDF). American Economic Review. 101 (1): 196–233. doi:10.1257/aer.101.1.196. S2CID 11039546.
- Doepke, Matthias; Zilibotti, Fabrizio (2008). "Occupational Choice and the Spirit of Capitalism". Quarterly Journal of Economics. 123 (2): 747–793. doi:10.1162/qjec.2008.123.2.747. S2CID 2649231.
- Aghion, Philippe; Burgess, Robin; Redding, Stephen; Zilibotti, Fabrizio (2008). "The Unequal Effects of Liberalization: Evidence from Dismantling the License Raj in India" (PDF). American Economic Review. 98 (4): 1397–1412. doi:10.1257/aer.98.4.1397. S2CID 966634.
- Acemoğlu, Daron; Aghion, Philippe; Lelarge, Claire; Van Reenen, John; Zilibotti, Fabrizio (2007). "Technology, Information, and the Decentralization of the Firm" (PDF). Quarterly Journal of Economics. 122 (4): 1759–1799. doi:10.1162/qjec.2007.122.4.1759. S2CID 11385763.
- Acemoğlu, Daron; Aghion, Philippe; Zilibotti, Fabrizio (2006). "Distance to Frontier, Selection, and Economic Growth". Journal of the European Economic Association. 4 (1): 37–74. doi:10.1162/jeea.2006.4.1.37. hdl:1721.1/63472.
- Doepke, Matthias; Zilibotti, Fabrizio (2005). "The Macroeconomics of Child Labor Regulation". American Economic Review. 95 (5): 1492–1524. doi:10.1257/000282805775014425.
- Hassler, John; Rodriguez Mora, Jose V.; Storesletten, Kjetil; Zilibotti, Fabrizio (2003). "The Survival of the Welfare State" (PDF). American Economic Review. 93 (1): 87–112. doi:10.1257/000282803321455179. S2CID 5183184.
- Acemoğlu, Daron; Zilibotti, Fabrizio (2001). "Productivity Differences" (PDF). Quarterly Journal of Economics. 116 (2): 563–606. Bibcode:2001QJEco.116..563A. doi:10.1162/00335530151144104. S2CID 219364814.
- Marimon, Ramon; Zilibotti, Fabrizio (1999). "Unemployment vs. Mismatch of Talents: Reconsidering Unemployment Benefits". The Economic Journal. 109 (455): 266–291. doi:10.1111/1468-0297.00432. hdl:10230/640. S2CID 18376676.
- Acemoğlu, Daron; Zilibotti, Fabrizio (1997). "Was Prometheus Unbound by Chance? Risk, Diversification, and Growth". Journal of Political Economy. 105 (4): 709–751. Bibcode:1997JPoEc.105..709A. doi:10.1086/262091. hdl:1721.1/64376. S2CID 17392005.

== Research in progress ==
- Agostinelli, Francesco; Doepke, Matthias; Sorrenti, Giuseppe; Zilibotti, Fabrizio (April 2020). "It Takes a Village: The Economics of Parenting with Neighborhood and Peer Effects". NBER Working Paper 27050. Working Paper Series. doi:10.3386/w27050. hdl:10419/216473.
