= Bohnet =

Bohnet is a surname of German origin. Notable people with the surname include:

- Eva Bohnet, the maiden name of Eva Köhler, wife of the ninth President of Germany
- Folker Bohnet (1937–2020), German actor, director and playwright
- Iris Bohnet, Swiss professor at the Kennedy School of Government, Cambridge, Massachusetts
- John Bohnet (born 1961), American baseball pitcher
