= Leape =

Leape may refer to:

- James P. Leape (born 1956), American lawyer and environmentalist, Director General of WWF (2005–2014)
- Jonathan Leape, American economist, executive director of the International Growth Centre
- Lucian Leape (1930–2025), American pediatric surgeon and professor

== See also ==
- Leaper (disambiguation)
