= Romain Wacziarg =

American economist

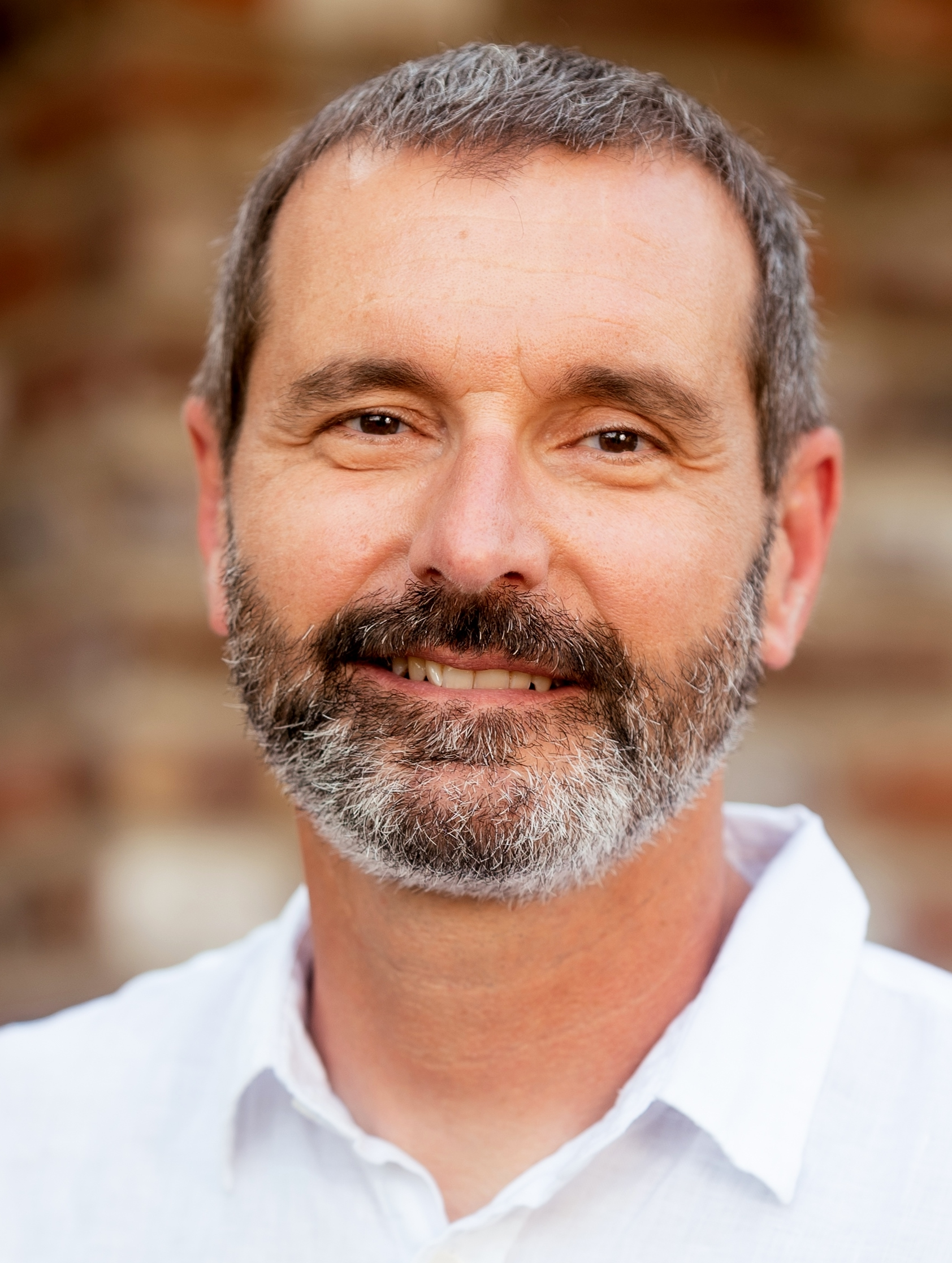
- Born: January 6, 1970 (age 56); Geneva, Switzerland
- Occupation: Economist

Academic background
- Education: Harvard University (PhD); Université Paris Dauphine (DEA); Sciences Po (Diplôme)

Academic work
- Discipline: Economics
- Sub-discipline: Political economy International economics Economic growth Economic development
- Institutions: UCLA Anderson School of Management; Stanford Graduate School of Business; National Bureau of Economic Research
- Website: http://wacziarg.bol.ucla.edu

Romain Wacziarg (born 1970) is an economist who has served as a professor of economics at the UCLA Anderson School of Management since 2011, where he has also held the Hans Hufschmid Chair in Management since 2015. He was previously a professor of economics at the Stanford Graduate School of Business. His research interests span international economics, political economy, economic growth, and economic development.

== Background and professional life ==
Wacziarg was born in Switzerland in 1970, and raised in India and France. He received a diplôme in economics and public policy from the Institute d'Études Politiques de Paris in 1990, a DEA in economics from the Université Paris Dauphine in 1992, and a PhD in economics from Harvard University in 1998, where he was advised by Robert Barro, Alberto Alesina, and Dale Jorgenson. Whilst a doctoral student at Harvard, he worked for the World Bank as short-term consultant between 1996 and 1997.

In 1998, Wacziarg became an assistant professor within the Political Economy Group at the Stanford Graduate School of Business, where he was appointed an associate professor in 2002, and was tenured in 2006. In 2008, he moved to the UCLA Anderson School of Management, where he became a full professor in 2011, and was appointed to the Hans Hufschmid Chair in Management in 2015. In 2021, he was appointed a co-editor of the Journal of the European Economic Association, and became its managing editor in 2023.

Wacziarg was the Edward Teller National Fellow at the Hoover Institution between 2002 and 2003, and has been a research associate at the NBER since 2006.

Wacziarg's research covers a variety of topics, including:

- The relationship between trade liberalization and growth;
- The long-run determinants of growth and development;
- The determinants of the first demographic transition;
- The causes of inter-state conflict;
- The effects of democratization on economic growth;
- The pattern of sectoral diversification in relation to economic development;
- The effect of cultural distance between countries on the diffusion of technology and development.

== Selected publications ==
- Openness, Country Size and Government, with A. Alesina (1998), Journal of Public Economics, 69(3), 305–321.
- Is Europe Going Too Far?, with A. Alesina (1999), Carnegie-Rochester Conference Series on Public Policy, 51(1), 1–42.
- Economic Integration and Political Disintegration, with A. Alesina and E. Spolaore (2000), American Economic Review, 90(5), 1276–1296.
- How Democracy Affects Growth, with J. Tavares (2001). European Economic Review, 45(8), 1341–1378.
- Measuring the Dynamic Gains From Trade, (2001), The World Bank Economic Review, 15(3), 393–429.
- Stages of Diversification, with J. Imbs (2003), American Economic Review, 93(1), 63–86.
- Fractionalization, with A. Alesina, A. Devleeschauwer, W. Easterly, S. Kurlat (2003), Journal of Economic Growth, 8(2), 155–194.
- Trade Liberalization and Intersectoral Labor Movements, with J. Wallack (2004), Journal of International Economics, 64(2), 411–439.
- Do Democratic Transitions Produce Bad Economic Outcomes?, with D. Rodrik (2005), American Economic Review Papers and Proceedings, 50–55.
- Borders and Growth, with E. Spolaore (2005), Journal of Economic Growth, 10(4), 331–386.
- Small States, Big Pork, with W. R. Hauk Jr. (2007), Quarterly Journal of Political Science, 2(1), 95–106.
- Death and Development, with P. Lorentzen and J. McMillan (2008), Journal of Economic Growth, 13(2), 81-124.
- Trade Liberalization and Growth: New Evidence, with K. Welch (2008), The World Bank Economic Review, 22(2), 187–231.
- The Diffusion of Development, with E. Spolaore (2009), The Quarterly Journal of Economics, 124(2), 469–529.
- A Monte Carlo Study of Growth Regressions, with W. R. Hauk Jr. (2009), Journal of Economic Growth, 14(2), 103–147.
- The Political Economy of Linguistic Cleavages, with K. Desmet and I. Ortuño-Ortín (2012), Journal of Development Economics, 97(2), 322–338.
- Wacziarg, Romain (2012). "The First Law of Petropolitics". Economica. 79 (316): 641–657. ISSN 0013-0427. JSTOR 23274785.
- How Deep Are the Roots of Economic Development?, with E. Spolaore (2013), Journal of Economic Literature, 51(2), 325–369.
- The Democratic Transition, with F. Murtin (2014), Journal of Economic Growth, 19(2), 141–181.
- War and Relatedness, with E. Spolaore (2016), The Review of Economics and Statistics, 98(5), 925–939.
- Culture, Ethnicity and Diversity, with K. Desmet and I. Ortuño-Ortín (2017), American Economic Review, 107(9), 2479–2513.
- Ancestry and Development: New Evidence, with E. Spolaore (2018), Journal of Applied Econometrics, 33(5), 748–762.
- Change and Persistence in the Age of Modernization: Saint-Germain-d'Anxure 1730–1895, with G. Blanc (2020), Explorations in Economic History, 78, 101352.
- The Cultural Divide, with K. Desmet (2021), The Economic Journal, 131(637), 2058–2088.
- Understanding Spatial Variation in COVID-19 across the United States, with K. Desmet (2022), Journal of Urban Economics, 127, 103332.
- Fertility and Modernity, with E. Spolaore (2022), The Economic Journal, 132(642), 796–833.
- Disentangling the Evolutionary Drivers of Social Complexity: A Comprehensive Test of Hypotheses (2022), with P. Turchin and others, Science Advances, 8(25), eabn3517.
- Barriers to Global Capital Allocation (2025), with Bruno Pellegrino and Enrico Spolaore, The Quarterly Journal of Economics.
