= Dave Donaldson (economist) =

British economist (born 1978)

- Born: 4 June 1978 (age 48)

Academic background
- Education: Trinity College, Oxford (MPhys); London School of Economics (Dipl., MSc, PhD)
- Doctoral advisor: Tim Besley; Robin Burgess

Academic work
- Discipline: International trade Economic Development; Economic History; Environmental Economics
- Institutions: Massachusetts Institute of Technology; National Bureau of Economic Research
- Awards: John Bates Clark Medal (2017); Fellow BREAD

Dave Donaldson (born 4 June 1978) is a Canadian economist and a professor of economics at Massachusetts Institute of Technology. He was awarded the 2017 John Bates Clark Medal and elected fellow of the American Academy of Arts and Sciences in 2020.

== Education and academic career ==
Donaldson received a Masters in Physics from Trinity College, Oxford, in 2001, and a Diploma in 2002, an M.Sc. in 2003 and a Ph.D. in 2009, all in Economics from the London School of Economics. His research explores welfare and economic growth effects of market integration; broad impacts of reduced intra-national trade barriers; and how climate-change-effects-on-humans, as well as food security and famine risks may each be mediated by trade and specialization.

He served as a co-editor of Econometrica from 2019 to 2023.

== Work ==
Donaldson's work has been described by colleague Daron Acemoglu as "empirical international trade that takes geography seriously". Likewise, Kevin A. Bryan of the University of Toronto wrote "it is hard to think of any young economist whose work is as serious as Donaldson's." Trade barriers do not only take the form of tariffs between countries; they might also take the form of geographic barriers within a country. Donaldson's work uses trade theory to examine transportation improvements, as if they were a reductions in tariff rates.

His most cited paper, Railroads of the Raj, was covered favorably in The Economist. The paper uses new trade theory to estimate the total welfare impacts of the opening of railroads in India during the British Raj. Rather than simply estimate the effect on incomes of a railroad opening or not opening due to plausibly exogenous factors, he considers the effects on the whole system. If a railroad opens to an Indian state, it causes a shift not only in the trade patterns of that state but every other state. Using an Eaton-Kortum model, he shows that all that is needed to find welfare effects is the agricultural productivity in a state, the elasticity of trade flows, and the share of the economy that comes from trade. He calculates trade costs using particular varieties of salt which are only produced in one region, but sold throughout India, and finds the elasticity of trade using rainfall shocks. Access to railroads increased local annual incomes by 16%. By comparison, real incomes across India rose 22% between 1870 and 1930.

An accompanying paper with Robin Burgess shows that the railroads decreased the frequency and severity of famines, a result which is not ex ante obvious. Increased access to trade reduces farmers' dependence on how their particular crops are doing, but makes them more dependent upon the vagaries of the market. In India, the positive effect of trade access prevailed, leading to the almost total disappearance of famines outside of wartime.

The approach of modeling the effects of transportation improvements in general equilibrium is taken up again by Donaldson in a paper with Richard Hornbeck on railroads in the United States. There has been a long historical debate on the importance of the railroad in American economic growth, with Fogel controversially advancing the thesis that the impact of railroads never being invented would be insubstantial. Donaldson and Hornbeck look at the effect on agriculture, taking into account the fact that a rail line from, for example, Columbus, Ohio to Cincinnati, Ohio, affects not only the terms of trade between the two cities, but the terms of trade between every city in the United States. Removing the railroads in 1890 would decrease the total value of agricultural land alone by nearly 60%.

Donaldson, with Costinot, looked at the effects of the economic integration of the United States on agriculture more generally, using a dataset of the potential productivity of every section of land for every crop in the United States. This allows them to estimate the optimal combination of crops if there were no trade barriers, and calculate how far away from optimal trade barriers push us. They find that up to 80% of the economic growth of agriculture between 1880 and 1997 is due to trade. Costinot and Donaldson, with Cory Smith, scale this up to the entire globe and apply it to climate change. Allowing production patterns to adjust would substantially mitigate damages to crops, with international trade having only a limited role. Costinot and Donaldson also use this dataset to test whether Ricardian comparative advantage explains the pattern of agricultural trade around the world, finding strong evidence that it does.

Donaldson has also contributed to trade theory. Arkolakis, Costinot, Donaldson, and Rodriguez-Clare, extend the work of ACR (2012) to analyze the gains from trade when markups are variable, in "The Elusive Pro-Competitive Effects of Trade". The gains from a country opening up their markets to trade may increase competition, and reduce the markups of domestic firms. On the other hand, foreign firms might be able to increase their markups. When the assumption of CES utility (which necessitates constant markups) is dropped, the welfare impact can by summarized by a constant multiplied by the welfare impact of trade under CES utility. Plugging in parameter estimates shows that opening trade need not improve allocation. The reduction in markups by domestic firms is offset by the increase in markups by foreign firms.

== Selected publications ==
- Donaldson, Dave (2018). "Railroads of the Raj: Estimating the Impact of Transportation Infrastructure". American Economic Review. 108 (4–5): 899–934. doi:10.1257/aer.20101199. hdl:1721.1/128506. S2CID 11950761.
- Donaldson, Dave; Hornbeck, Richard (2016). "Railroads and American Economic Growth: A 'Market Access' Approach". Quarterly Journal of Economics. 101 (7): 799–858. doi:10.1093/qje/qjw002. S2CID 7831109.
