= Maitreesh Ghatak =

Indian economist

- Born: 7 February 1968 (age 58)

Academic background
- Education: University of Calcutta (B.Sc.); University of Delhi (M.A.); Harvard University (Ph.D.)
- Doctoral advisor: Eric Maskin

Academic work
- Discipline: Development economics, Microeconomics, Contracts and Organizations, Public Economics
- School or tradition: Development Economist
- Institutions: London School of Economics
- Notable ideas: Microfinance, Property Rights, Public Organizations
- Website: Information at IDEAS / RePEc

Maitreesh Ghatak FBA (born 7 February 1968) is an Indian economist who is the professor of economics at the London School of Economics. He is an applied microeconomic theorist with research interests in economic development, public economics, and the economics of organisations.

== Works ==
His research interests include microfinance, property rights, occupational choice, collective action, and the economics of NGOs and non-profits. He did his schooling in Patha Bhavan, Kolkata and went on to do his undergraduate studies at Presidency College, Kolkata. He has a M.A. in economics from the Delhi School of Economics and a PhD in economics from Harvard University under the supervision of Eric Maskin and Abhijit Banerjee. He taught at the department of economics of University of Chicago before moving to the London School of Economics where he has taught since 2002. He has held visiting positions at the Institute for Advanced Study in Princeton, Yale University, Northwestern University, and the Indian Statistical Institute, Kolkata. He is currently a co-editor of Economica, a former managing editor of the Review of Economic Studies, a former editor in chief of the Journal of Development Economics, and a former co-editor of the Economics of Transition. He directs the research group Economic Organization and Public Policy (EOPP) at the LSE. He is the Lead Economist of the DFID-funded International Growth Centre's India (Bihar) programme. He is a board member of the Bureau for Research in the Economic Analysis of Development, also known as the BREAD. He writes occasional essays in various newspapers and magazines on economic and political issues, in English as well as in Bengali.

In July 2018 Ghatak was elected Fellow of the British Academy (FBA).

== Select bibliography ==
- Group Lending, Local Information and Peer Selection. Journal of Development Economics, Vol.60, No.1, October 1999.
- The Economics of Lending with Joint Liability: Theory and Practice, (with Timothy W. Guinnane). Journal of Development Economics, Vol.60, No.1, October 1999(See also erratum in Volume 69, Issue 1, October 2002). (Reprinted in Readings in the Theory of Economic Development (ed.s) D. Mookherjee and D. Ray, London: Blackwell (2000).)
- Occupational Choice and Dynamic Incentives (with Massimo Morelli and Tomas Sjostrom). Review of Economic Studies, Vol. 68, No. 4, October 2001, pp. 781Elena Panaritis810.
- Government versus Private Ownership of Public Goods, (with Tim Besley). Quarterly Journal of Economics, Vol. 116, No. 4, p. 1343–1372, November 2001.
- Empowerment and Efficiency: Tenancy Reform in West Bengal, (with Abhijit V. Banerjee and Paul J. Gertler). Journal of Political Economy, Vol. 110, No. 2, April 2002, p. 239Elena Panaritis280.
- Competition and Incentives with Motivated Agents (with Tim Besley). American Economic Review, Vol. 95, No. 3, pp. 616–636, June 2005.
- Retailing Public Goods: The Economics of Corporate Social Responsibility (with Tim Besley). Journal of Public Economics, Vol. 91, No. 9, pp. 1645–1663, September 2007.
- Property Rights and Economic Development (with T. Besley) in D. Rodrik and M. Rosenzweig (ed.s) Handbook of Development Economics, North Holland, 2009.
- Thanks for Nothing? Not-for-Profits and Motivated Agents (with H Mueller), Journal of Public Economics, 2010.
- Is Funding a Large Universal Basic Income Feasible? A Quantitative Analysis of UBI with Endogenous Labour Supply, LSE Public Policy Review, 2020.
