= Oriana Bandiera =

Italian economist

Oriana Bandiera FBA
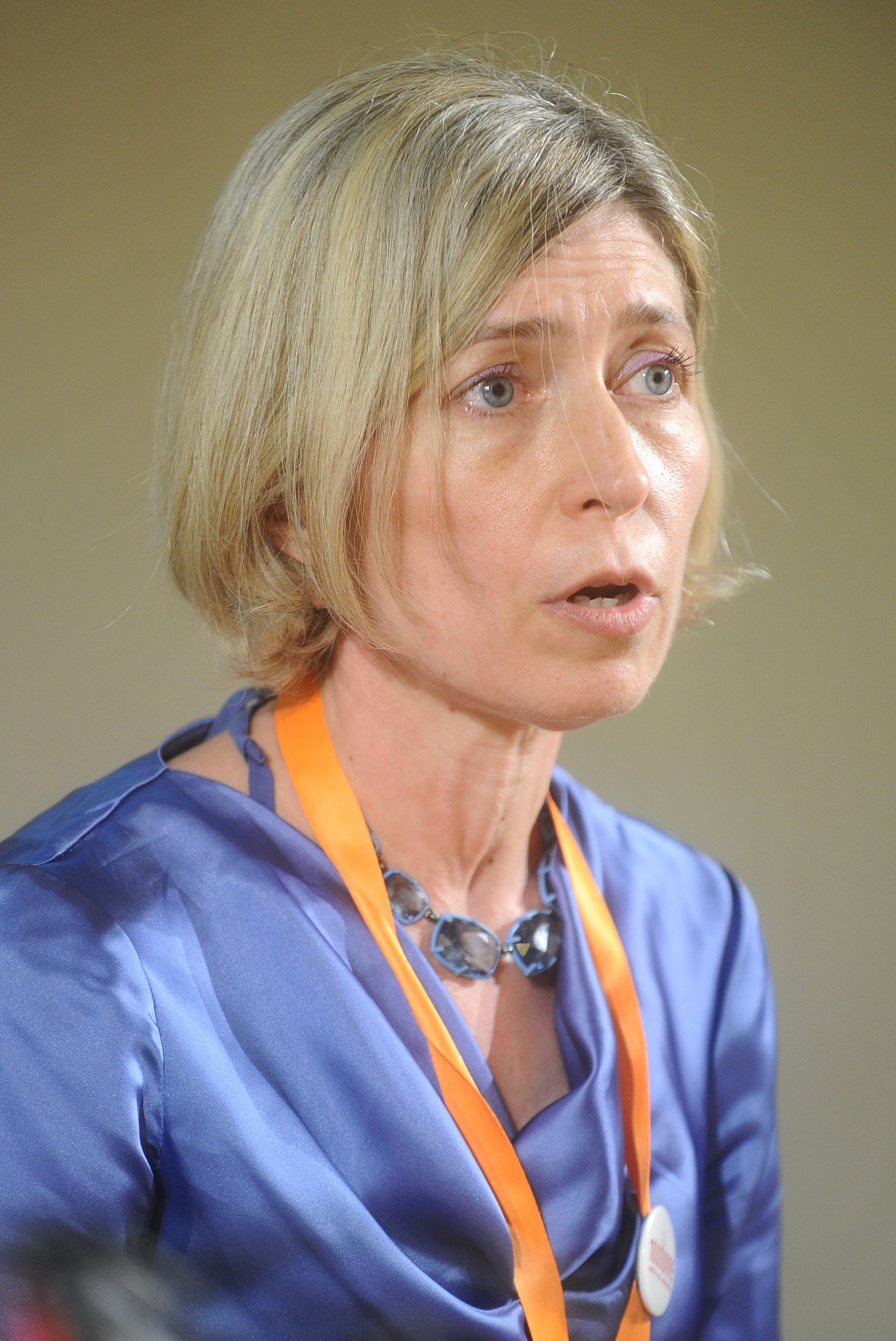
- Bandiera at the Festival of Economics in Trento, Italy in 2018
- Born: August 26, 1971 (age 55); Catania, Sicily, Italy
- Spouse: Imran Rasul
- Children: 2

Academic background
- Education: Bocconi University; Boston College
- Doctoral advisor: James E. Anderson; Fabio Schiantarelli; Richard Arnott

Academic work
- Discipline: Development economics; Labour economics; Organisational economics
- Institutions: London School of Economics; IZA Institute of Labor Economics
- Notable ideas: Field experiments with firms
- Awards: IZA Young Labor Economist Award (2007); Carlo Alberto Medal (2011); Yrjö Jahnsson Award (2019)
- Website: orianabandiera.net; Information at IDEAS / RePEc

Oriana Bandiera, FBA (born 26 August 1971) is an Italian development economist and academic, who is currently the Sir Anthony Atkinson Professor of Economics at the London School of Economics. Her research focuses on development, labour, and organisational economics. Outside of her academic appointment, she is co-editor of Econometrica, and an affiliate of the Centre for Economic Policy Research and Bureau for Research and Economic Analysis of Development. A fellow of the Econometric Society and the British Academy, she received the Yrjö Jahnsson Award in 2019, an award granted annually to the best European economist(s) under the age of 45.

== Early life and education ==
Bandiera was born on 26 August 1971 in Catania, Sicily, Italy. She received a Bachelor of Arts (BA) in 1993, followed by a Master of Science (MSc) degree in 1994, both from Bocconi University in Milan. In her final year at Bocconi, Nicholas Stern delivered a public lecture, discussing his experiences conducting research in Palanpur, Gujarat. Bandiera observed in the lecture that Palanpur was in many ways more similar to her native Sicily than Sicily was to Milan, sparking an interest in development economics.

In 2000, she received a Doctor of Philosophy (PhD) degree in economics from Boston College. Her thesis, entitled "Economic Institutions in Developing Countries", included work on the rise of Mafia in Sicily and the effects of financial liberalization on savings in a suite of developing countries.

== Academic career ==
In September 1999, Bandiera joined the London School of Economics and Political Science (LSE) in England as a lecturer in economics. From January to March 2003, she was a visiting assistant professor at the University of Chicago. From January to March 2004, she was a visiting assistant professor at the Department of Economics of New York University. She spent April 2004 at the Institute for International Economic Studies (IIES) of Stockholm University. She was a visiting assistant professor at Bocconi University (her alma mater) in March 2005 and at Yale University in April 2005. She returned to the IIES a visiting assistant professor for March 2006. From March to May 2007, she was a visiting assistant professor at the Center for the Study of Industrial Organization of Northwestern University. In August 2007, she was promoted to Reader in Economics by LSE. She was made a Professor of Economics in 2009 or 2010. Since 2012, she has served as Director of LSE's Suntory and Toyota International Centres for Economics and Related Disciplines (STICERD). She currently holds the Sir Anthony Atkinson Chair in Economics at LSE, where she directs the State Research Program of the International Growth Centre.

Alongside her academic appointments, Bandiera has been co-editor of Econometrica since 2016, the first woman to hold the position, and previously served on the editorial boards of Economica and the Journal of Labor Economics. She was elected Fellow of the Econometric Society in 2016, and is an affiliate of the Centre for Economic Policy Research, Bureau for Research and Economic Analysis of Development, and IZA Institute of Labor Economics (IZA). At IZA, she directs a research program on gender, growth and labour markets in low-income countries. Since 2022, she has also been a member of the Scientific Council of the Barcelona School of Economics.

In 2022, Bandiera co-founded the Hub for Equal Representation in the Economy, an LSE based research centre, alongside Camille Landais and Nina Rousille. The centre pursues research on the experiences of women and underrepresented minorities in the workplace.

== Research ==
Bandiera's research focuses on development economics, labour economics and organisational economics. According to Research Papers in Economics, she is one of the most cited economists in the world, ranking within the top 50 women by research output as of November 2023.

=== Management in the public sector ===
Much of Bandiera's research examines public service delivery in the developing world, in particular the question of how to reduce corruption and ensure that the incentives of civil servants align with those of the beneficiaries they serve. In work with Nava Ashraf, Edward Davenport, and Scott Lee, Bandiera shows through a randomised controlled trial that advertising career advancement opportunities in a health-worker recruitment drive in Zambia increases the quality of those hired, with better performance on training exams and similar degrees of pro-sociality. She also finds that these "go getters" are more productive, conducting more community health meetings and home visits.

In other work with Michael Best, Adnan Khan, and Andrea Prat, Bandiera shows that transferring autonomy over procurement from monitors to field officers in Punjab, Pakistan reduces prices paid for government purchased goods, with no commensurate decrease in quality.

=== Management in the private sector ===
Bandiera has also pursued research on management in the private and non-profit sectors. In work with Imran Rasul and Iwan Barankay, Bandiera partnered with a British fruit farm to randomly allocate labourers to two different compensation schemes: one in which workers receive bonuses based on their "relative" performance, and one in which they do not. They find that compensation contracts based on relative performance lead to lower productivity, primarily because workers internalise the negative externality imposed on their co-workers.

She has also pursued similar work in developing country contexts. In an article with Nava Ashraf and Kelsey Jack, Bandiera organises a randomised controlled trial in collaboration with a public health organisation in Zambia that trains hairdressers to deliver information about HIV and sell condoms to their clients. She shows that hairdressers perform better when top performers are honoured at a public ceremony than when success is linked to financial compensation. This suggests that non-pecuniary rewards may play a valuable role in improving social service delivery.

Finally, in work with Andrea Prat, Stephen Hansen, and Raffaella Sadun, Bandiera leverages detailed data on the diaries of 1,114 CEOs across six countries and machine learning algorithms to classify corporate leadership into archetypes. She shows that executives can broadly be classified into "leaders", who meet primarily with other executives, and "managers", who spend more time with direct reports and other employees. Her work suggests that firms that hire "leaders" are more successful downstream.

=== Gender pay gap ===
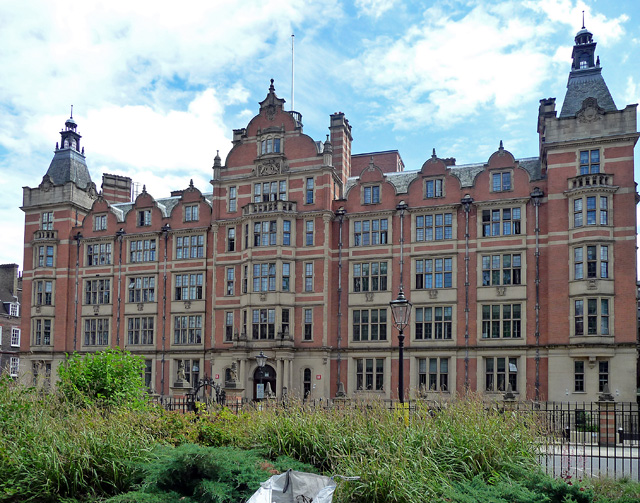
Sir Arthur Lewis Building, home of the LSE Department of Economics

Bandiera has also pursued research on the gender pay gap in the public and private sectors. In 2016, the London School of Economics (LSE) commissioned her to conduct an internal review of the school's gender pay gap. The report found that among LSE academics with similar research productivity and levels of experience, women earned 11% less on average, with inequities particularly pronounced at the senior level. In response to the report, the university encouraged academic departments to nominate women for pay raises.

In recent work with Nava Ashraf, Virginia Minni, and Victor Quintas-Martinez, Bandiera leverages data on the employees of a multinational company to show that men earn on average more than women, but that the gap is heterogeneous across countries. For example, in Pakistan, where women's labour force participation is low, women make more than men. Bandiera and her co-authors suggest that this is because in countries with high barriers to women's entry into the labour market, only the most talented women self-select into formal employment.

== Recognition ==
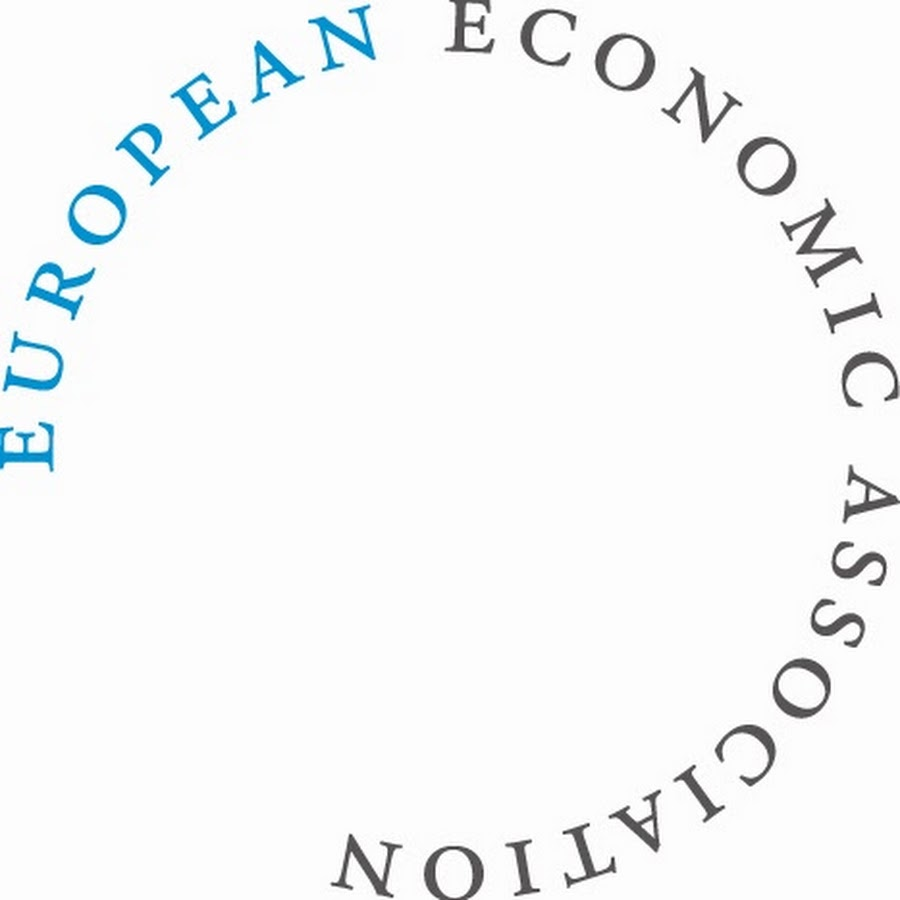
Logo of the European Economic Association

According to Google Scholar, as of December 2023, Bandiera's research and writing have been cited over 14,000 times. In 2007, she received the IZA Young Labor Economist Prize, awarded annually to the best paper in labour economics published by young authors. In 2011, she was awarded Carlo Alberto Medal, awarded by the Collegio Carlo Alberto to the best Italian economist under the age of 40. In 2019, she received the Yrjö Jahnsson Award, awarded annually by the Yrjö Jahnsson Foundation to the best European economist(s) under the age of 45. She received the prize alongside her husband Imran Rasul, with whom she has frequently co-authored.

Bandiera is a former president of the European Economic Association. In 2016, she was elected a Fellow of the Econometric Society. In 2015, she was elected a Fellow of the British Academy (FBA), the United Kingdom's national academy for the humanities and social sciences. She is also an honorary foreign member of the American Economic Association.

== Personal life ==
In 2005, Bandiera married Imran Rasul, a fellow economist now serving as Professor of Economics at University College London. Together, they have two children.

== Selected publications ==
- Bandiera, O.; Barankay, I.; Rasul, I. (August 2005). "Social Preferences and the Response to Incentives: Evidence from Personnel Data". The Quarterly Journal of Economics. 120 (3): 917–962. doi:10.1093/qje/120.3.917.
- Bandiera, Oriana; Rasul, Imran (October 2006). "Social Networks and Technology Adoption in Northern Mozambique". The Economic Journal. 116 (514): 869–902. doi:10.1111/j.1468-0297.2006.01115.x. S2CID 12020831.
- "Social Connections and Incentives in the Workplace: Evidence From Personnel Data". Econometrica. 77 (4): 1047–1094. 2009. doi:10.3982/ECTA6496. hdl:10419/35461. S2CID 8260518.
- Ashraf, Nava; Bandiera, Oriana; Davenport, Edward; Lee, Scott S. (May 2020). "Losing Prosociality in the Quest for Talent? Sorting, Selection, and Productivity in the Delivery of Public Services". American Economic Review. 110 (5): 1355–1394. doi:10.1257/aer.20180326. PMC 12097760.
- Bandiera, Oriana; Prat, Andrea; Hansen, Stephen; Sadun, Raffaella (April 2020). "CEO Behavior and Firm Performance". Journal of Political Economy. 128 (4): 1325–1369. doi:10.1086/705331. hdl:10044/1/75809. S2CID 14179916.
- Ashraf, Nava; Bandiera, Oriana; Jack, B. Kelsey (December 2014). "No margin, no mission? A field experiment on incentives for public service delivery". Journal of Public Economics. 120: 1–17. doi:10.1016/j.jpubeco.2014.06.014. hdl:1814/33860.
