= Kjetil Storesletten =

Norwegian economist

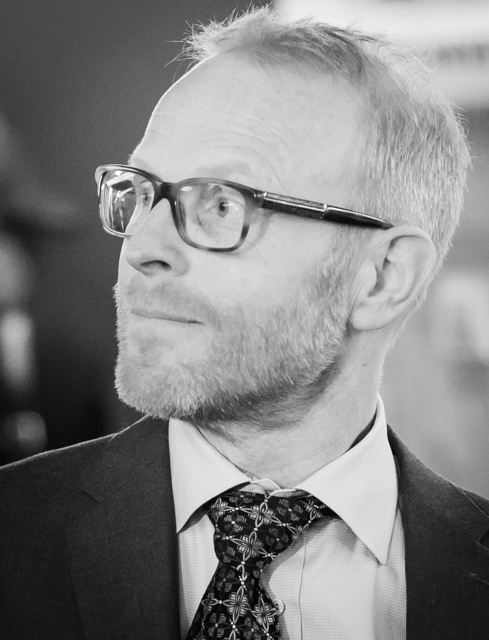
- Guests at Governor Øystein Olsen's annual address in February 2017.
- Born: 1 February 1967 (age 59)

Academic background
- Education: Carnegie Mellon University; Norwegian School of Economics
- Influences: Finn Kydland

Academic work
- Discipline: Macroeconomics
- Institutions: University of Minnesota
- Website: Information at IDEAS / RePEc

Kjetil Storesletten (born 1 February 1967) is a Norwegian economist. He is a professor of economics at the University of Minnesota. Between 2009 and 2012, he was a monetary advisor to the Federal Reserve Bank of Minneapolis. He also served as the European Economic Association's president in 2019.

Storesletten earned his doctorate in economics from Carnegie Mellon University in 1995.

== Selected publications ==
- Song, Zheng; ———; Zilibotti, Fabrizio (2012). "Rotten Parents and Disciplined Children: A Politico-Economic Theory of Public Expenditure and Debt". Econometrica. 80 (6): 2785–2804. doi:10.3982/ecta8910.
- Heathcote, Jonathan; ———; Violante, Giovanni L. (2010). "The Macroeconomic Implications of Rising Wage Inequality in the United States" (PDF). Journal of Political Economy. 118 (4): 681–722. doi:10.1086/656632. S2CID 158269513.
- ———; Telmer, Chris I.; Yaron, Amir (2004). "Cyclical Dynamics in Idiosyncratic Labor Market Risk". Journal of Political Economy. 112 (3): 695–717. doi:10.1086/383105. S2CID 7065721.
- ——— (2000). "Sustaining Fiscal Policy Through Immigration". Journal of Political Economy. 108 (2): 300–324. doi:10.1086/262120. S2CID 154296475.
