= Economica =

- Discipline: Economics
- Language: English
- Edited by: Nava Ashraf, Oriana Bandiera, Tim Besley, Francesco Caselli, Maitreesh Ghatak, Stephen Machin, Ian Martin, and Gianmarco Ottaviano

Publication details
- History: 1921–present
- Publisher: Wiley-Blackwell for the Department of Economics at the London School of Economics (United Kingdom)
- Frequency: Quarterly
- Impact factor: 1.500 (2018)

Standard abbreviations
- ISO 4: Economica

Indexing
- ISSN: 0013-0427 (print); 1468-0335 (web)
- LCCN: 22023854
- JSTOR: 00130427
- OCLC no.: 47075577

Links
- Journal homepage; Online access; Online archive; Ingentaconnect archive; Page at the LSE

Economica is a peer-reviewed academic journal of generalist economics published on behalf of the London School of Economics by Wiley-Blackwell. Established in 1921, it is currently edited by Nava Ashraf, Oriana Bandiera, Tim Besley, Francesco Caselli, Maitreesh Ghatak, Stephen Machin, Ian Martin, and Gianmarco Ottaviano.

== Notable papers ==
Two very influential papers in economics were published in Economica and have inspired a lecture series held annually at the London School of Economics:

- Coase, R. H. (1937). "The Nature of the Firm". Economica. 4 (16): 386–405. doi:10.1111/j.1468-0335.1937.tb00002.x.
- Phillips, A. W. (1958). "The Relation Between Unemployment and the Rate of Change of Money Wage Rates in the United Kingdom, 1861?1957". Economica. 25 (100): 283–299. doi:10.1111/j.1468-0335.1958.tb00003.x. S2CID 153833665.

== Abstracting and indexing ==
According to the Journal Citation Reports, the journal has a 2018 impact factor of 1.500, ranking it 149th out of 363 journals in the category "Economics".

== See also ==
- List of economics journals
