= Stephen Coate =

British-American economist

Academic background
- Education: Swansea University; University of Sussex; Northwestern University
- Thesis: Three Essays on Famine Relief Policy
- Doctoral advisor: Bill Rogerson

Academic work
- Discipline: Economist
- Sub-discipline: Political economy, public economics, public policy
- Institutions: Harvard Kennedy School; University of Pennsylvania; Cornell University

Stephen Thomas Redvers Coate is a British-American economist and currently Kiplinger Professor of Public Policy at Cornell University. His research focuses on developing economic models to analyze public policy issues.

== Education ==
Coate graduated with a B.Sc. in economics from the University College of Swansea in 1980. He went on to further study at the University of Sussex and received an M.A. in public policy in 1981. He received his PhD from Northwestern University in 1988.

== Career ==
Coate's first academic position was as an assistant professor of public policy at the Harvard Kennedy School of Government. He left Harvard for the University of Pennsylvania in 1990, where he worked as an assistant professor of economics until 1993 and assistant professor of public policy until 1997. He was granted tenure and associate professorship in 1997 but left for his current position at Cornell University the following year.

He was elected fellow of the Econometric Society and the American Academy of Arts and Sciences in 2004 and 2017, respectively.

He has served a range of academic journals in an editorial capacity, such as the Journal of Public Economics, the American Economic Review and the Quarterly Journal of Economics.

== Selected works ==
- Besley, Timothy; Coate, Stephen (1995). "Group lending, repayment incentives and social collateral". Journal of Development Economics. 46: 1–18. doi:10.1016/0304-3878(94)00045-E.
- Besley, T.; Coate, S. (1997). "An Economic Model of Representative Democracy". The Quarterly Journal of Economics. 112: 85–114. doi:10.1162/003355397555136.
- Besley, Timothy; Coate, Stephen (2003). "Centralized versus decentralized provision of local public goods: A political economy approach". Journal of Public Economics. 87 (12): 2611–2637. doi:10.1016/S0047-2727(02)00141-X. S2CID 34971399.
- Azzimonti, Marina; Battaglini, Marco; Coate, Stephen (2016). "The costs and benefits of balanced budget rules: Lessons from a political economy model of fiscal policy". Journal of Public Economics. 136: 45–61. doi:10.1016/j.jpubeco.2016.03.001.
- Coate, Stephen; Milton, Ross T. (2019). "Optimal fiscal limits with overrides". Journal of Public Economics. 174: 76–92. doi:10.1016/j.jpubeco.2019.04.001. S2CID 8756380.
