= Annual Review of Economics =

- Discipline: Economics
- Language: English
- Edited by: Philippe Aghion, Timothy Besley

Publication details
- History: 2009–present, 17 years old
- Publisher: Annual Reviews (US)
- Frequency: Annually
- Open access: Subscribe to Open
- Impact factor: 12.2 (2025)

Standard abbreviations
- ISO 4: Annu. Rev. Econ.

Indexing
- ISSN: 1941-1383 (print); 1941-1391 (web)
- LCCN: 2008214322
- JSTOR: annureviecon
- OCLC no.: 190859329

Links
- Journal homepage

The Annual Review of Economics is a peer-reviewed academic journal that publishes an annual volume of review articles relevant to economics. It was established in 2009 and is published by Annual Reviews (AR). The co-editors are Philippe Aghion and Timothy Besley. As of 2023, it is being published as open access, under the Subscribe to Open model.

== History ==
The Annual Review of Economics was first published in 2009 by Annual Reviews (AR), a nonprofit organization whose stated mission is to synthesize knowledge "for the progress of science and the benefit of society." The journal's founding editors were Timothy Bresnahan and Nobel laureate Kenneth J. Arrow. As of 2021, it is published both in print and online.

== Scope and indexing ==
The Annual Review of Economics defines its scope as covering significant developments in economics; specific subdisciplines included are macroeconomics; microeconomics; international, social, behavioral, cultural, institutional, education, and network economics; public finance; economic growth, economic development; political economy; game theory; and social choice theory. As of 2026, Journal Citation Reports lists the journal's impact factor as 12.2, ranking it fifth of 626 journals in the category "Economics". It is abstracted and indexed in Scopus, Social Sciences Citation Index, ABI/INFORM, and EconLit, among others.

== Editorial processes ==
The Annual Review of Economics is helmed by the editor or the co-editors. The editor is assisted by the editorial committee, which includes associate editors, regular members, and occasionally guest editors. Guest members participate at the invitation of the editor, and serve terms of one year. All other members of the editorial committee are appointed by the AR board of directors and serve five-year terms. The editorial committee determines which topics should be included in each volume and solicits reviews from qualified authors. Unsolicited manuscripts are not accepted. Peer review of accepted manuscripts is undertaken by the editorial committee.

=== Editors of volumes ===
Dates indicate publication years in which someone was credited as a lead editor or co-editor of a journal volume. The planning process for a volume begins well before the volume appears, so appointment to the position of lead editor generally occurred prior to the first year shown here. An editor who has retired or died may be credited as a lead editor of a volume that they helped to plan, even if it is published after their retirement or death.

- Kenneth J. Arrow and Timothy Bresnahan (2009–2017)
- Philippe Aghion (2018)
- Aghion and Hélène Rey (2019–2026)
- Aghion and Timothy Besley (2026–present)

=== Current editorial board ===
As of 2026, the editorial committee consists of the three co-editors and the following members:

- Hanming Fang
- Alexandre Mas
- Serena Ng
- Nathan Nunn
- Larry Samuelson

Previous members (as of 2024) included Gene M. Grossman.

== See also ==
- Annual Review of Financial Economics
- List of economics journals
