= Eswar Prasad =

Indian-American economist (born 1965)

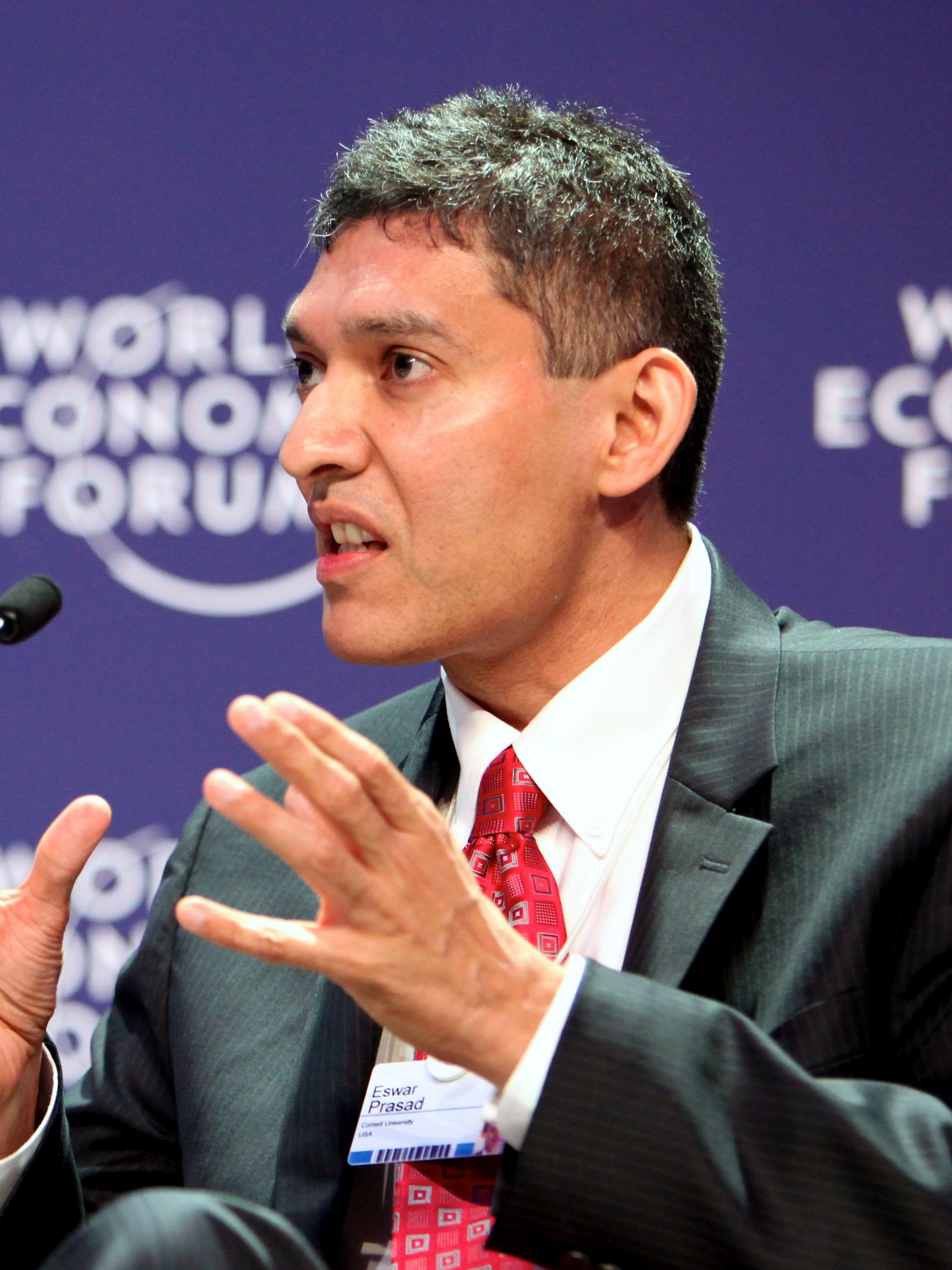
- World Economic Forum on East Asia, 2012
- Born: 1965 (age 60–61); India
- Education: University of Madras (BA); Brown University (MA); University of Chicago (PhD)
- Occupation: Economist
- Known for: Author of "The Dollar Trap", "Gaining Currency: The Rise of the Renminbi", "The Future of Money"
- Website: prasad.dyson.cornell.edu

Eswar Shanker Prasad (born 1965) is an American economist. He is the Tolani Senior Professor of International Trade Policy at Cornell University and a senior fellow at the Brookings Institution, where he holds the New Century Chair in Economics.

== Early life and education ==
Prasad began his studies in economics at the University of Madras, where he graduated with a B.A. in 1985. He received his M.A. from Brown University in 1986 and his Ph.D. from the University of Chicago in 1992. He is married to Basia Kaminska. They have two children, Berenika Prasad, Yuvika Prasad, and their dog, Mozart.

Prasad is a former Chief of the Financial Studies Division at the International Monetary Fund’s Research Department and was also the head of the IMF’s China division. He served as the co-editor of the journal IMF Staff Papers, was on the editorial board of Finance & Development and was the founding editor of the quarterly IMF Research Bulletin. He is also a research associate at the National Bureau of Economic Research and a research fellow at the Institute for the Study of Labor (IZA) in Bonn.

Prasad's research covers many areas including labor economics, business cycles, and open economy macroeconomics. He has testified before the United States Senate Committee on Finance and the United States House Committee on Financial Services (both on China), and his research has been cited in the U.S. Congressional Record. He is now also one of the two Lead Academics for the India country programme at the International Growth Centre. His publication record includes articles in many collective volumes as well as academic journals such as the American Economic Review, The Economic Journal, the Journal of Development Economics, the Journal of Economic Perspectives, the Journal of International Economics, the Journal of Monetary Economics and the Review of Economics and Statistics.

== Economic views ==
In a series of papers written with Michael Keane in the early 2000s, Prasad argued that the Polish model of transition, which involved rapid liberalization of prices and opening to trade ("The Big Bang"), combined with very gradual privatization of state enterprises and a generous system of social transfers, led to both superior economic growth and less inequality than occurred in other former communist countries.

In The Dollar Trap (2014), Prasad examined the U.S. dollar's continuing dominance in the world economy following the 2008 financial crisis. In an interview with the Wall Street Journal, he stated:

... it’s difficult to lay out a convincing scenario where the dollar is displaced any time in the foreseeable future as the dominant reserve currency. In international finance everything is relative. It’s not that the U.S. has especially good policies or growth prospects, it’s that the rest of the world looks weaker when it comes to putting together the powerful financial institutions that the U.S. has.... There are times, like during the debt-ceiling debate, when that trust is called into question. But the world has no other place to go, especially during times of global financial market turbulence or, paradoxically, even turbulence originating in the U.S.

Prasad was asked in 2014 to comment on whether he believed President Barack Obama would impose harsher sanctions against Russia for their aggression against Ukraine and annexation of Crimea. Prasad said harsher sanctions at this time were unlikely.

In October 2016, Prasad published Gaining Currency: The Rise of the Renminbi. As the date for the designation of the Chinese renminbi as an IMF major global currency also approached, Prasad

thinks fears of a [Chinese] financial meltdown are overblown. Most borrowers and lenders, he points out, are owned by the government, so banks are unlikely to pull their loans and precipitate a cascading crisis. Still, economic and financial fragility, he argues, will limit the rise of the Chinese yuan as a global “safe haven” currency.

The book was launched at Brookings with a panel including Prasad, Ben Bernanke and others moderated by Greg Ip of the Wall Street Journal.
