= Timothy Bresnahan =

American economist

- Born: 1953 (age 72–73); Falls Church, Virginia, United States
- Education: Haverford College; Princeton University
- Partner: Lenis Hazlett
- Children: 2
- Scientific career
- Workplaces: Stanford University; Harvard University; United States Department of Justice Antitrust Division
- Doctoral students: Bronwyn Hall

Timothy Francis Bresnahan (born 1953) is an American economist who researches industrial organization. He was a founding co-editor of the Annual Review of Economics, a fellow of the Econometric Society, and recipient of a BBVA Foundation Frontiers of Knowledge Award in 2017.

== Early life and education ==
Timothy Francis Bresnahan was born in 1953 to parents Nancy and Maurice F. Bresnahan. He grew up in Falls Church, Virginia with three siblings; his father worked for the government in the Bureau of Labor Statistics. He attended Haverford College where he received a bachelor's degree in economics and German in 1975. He received a master's from Princeton University in 1978 and stayed to earn a PhD in 1980, both in economics.

== Career ==
Bresnahan began working at Stanford University as an assistant professor in 1979. In 1986 he was promoted to associate professor; he held various outside positions in the next several years. From 1986 to 1987 he was the Marvin Bower Fellow and visiting associate professor at Harvard University. From 1989 to 1990 he was a visiting scholar at the Hoover Institution. He was promoted to full professor at Stanford in 1991, and in 2002 he became the Landau Professor in Technology and the Economy. He was the chair of the economics department from 2004 to 2008. He is now an Emeritus Professor at Stanford and Senior Fellow Emeritus at the Stanford Institute for Economic Policy Research. He served as chief economist of the United States Department of Justice Antitrust Division from 1999 to 2000.

Bresnahan has provided amicus briefs or testified in court, including the United States Supreme Court, about a variety of topics such as product liability, antitrust law, and intellectual property. He researches industrial organization and how technology generates value.

He was one of the founding editors of the Annual Review of Economics, which was first published in 2009. He remained co-editor with Kenneth J. Arrow through 2015. He has been an associate editor for RAND Journal of Economics, Journal of Industrial Economics, and American Economic Review.

== Awards and honors ==
In 2017 he was a recipient of a BBVA Foundation Frontiers of Knowledge Award. He is a fellow of the Econometric Society and the American Academy of Arts and Sciences.

== Personal life ==
He is married to Lenis Hazlett and has two children.
