= Torsten Persson =

Swedish economist (born 1954)

- Born: 18 April 1954 (age 72); Stockholm, Sweden

Academic background
- Education: Stockholm University
- Doctoral advisor: Lars E. O. Svensson

Academic work
- Discipline: Political economics Macroeconomics; International economics Public economics
- School or tradition: Constitutional economics
- Institutions: Stockholm University; London School of Economics
- Awards: Yrjö Jahnsson Award (1997); BBVA Foundation Frontiers of Knowledge Award (2022)
- Website: Information at IDEAS / RePEc

Torsten Persson (born 18 April 1954) is a Swedish economist who is the Swedish Research Council Distinguished Professor at the Institute for International Economic Studies, Stockholm University and Centennial Professor of Economics at the London School of Economics, and has held visiting positions at leading universities as Harvard, Princeton and Berkeley.

He has collaborated extensively with Guido Tabellini and Tim Besley on political economy.

Persson is a past director of the Institute for International Economic Studies, president of the European Economic Association, a member of The Royal Swedish Academy of Sciences, and serves on The Prize Committee for the Alfred Nobel Memorial Prize in Economic Sciences.

He is a member of the council for the Lindau Nobel Laureate Meetings.

For 2022 he was awarded the BBVA Foundation Frontiers of Knowledge Award.

== Work ==
- Political Economics – Explaining Economic Policy (with Guido Tabellini), MIT Press, 2000.
- The Economic Effects of Constitutions (with Guido Tabellini), MIT Press 2003.
