= Imran Rasul =

British academic economist

Imran Rasul OBE, FBA
- Born: 29 July 1974 (age 52)
- Spouse: Oriana Bandiera

Academic background
- Education: London School of Economics; University of Oxford
- Doctoral advisor: Timothy Besley

Academic work
- Discipline: Labour economics Development economics Public economics
- Institutions: University College London; Institute for Fiscal Studies; International Growth Centre; University of Chicago Graduate School of Business
- Awards: Yrjö Jahnsson Award (2019); IZA Institute of Labor Economics Young Economist Prize (2010)
- Website: Information at IDEAS / RePEc

Imran Rasul OBE FBA (born 29 July 1974) is a British Pakistani economist and academic. He is Professor of Economics at the University College London, managing editor of the Journal of the European Economic Association, and co-director of the Centre for the Microeconomic Analysis of Public Policy at the Institute for Fiscal Studies. His research interests include labour, development and public economics and he is considered to be one of the leaders within social norms and capital economics.

== Early life and education ==
Rasul was born on 29 July 1974 to parents of Pakistani descent. He studied economics at the London School of Economics (LSE), graduating with a Bachelor of Science (BSC) degree in 1995. He then undertook a Master of Philosophy (MPhil) degree at the University of Oxford, which he completed in 1997. He returned to LSE to under a Doctor of Philosophy (PhD) degree under the supervision of Professor Timothy Besley; he was awarded his doctorate in 2003 with a thesis entitled "Non-contractibilities in the household: Theory and evidence".

== Career ==
In 2018, Rasul was part of the Economic Advisory Council formed by Pakistani Prime Minister Imran Khan to provide assistance on issues of economics and finance but resigned in solidarity with Atif Mian who was asked to resign from the council due to his religious beliefs.

== Personal life ==
In 2005, Rasul married Oriana Bandiera, a fellow economist. Together, they have two children.

== Awards and honours ==
In 2007 Rasul was awarded the IZA Institute of Labor Economics Young Economist Prize.

In 2019 Rasul and Oriana Bandiera were jointly awarded the Yrjö Jahnsson Award in Economics. The award is given to a European economist that is no older than 45 years old and has made a contribution in theoretical and applied research that is significant to economies in Europe.

Rasul was elected as a Fellow of the British Academy (FBA) in 2019 and fellow of the Econometric Society in 2020.

He was appointed Officer of the Order of the British Empire (OBE) in the 2020 Birthday Honours for services to social sciences.
