= Institute for International Economic Studies =

Swedish research institute

The Institute for International Economic Studies (IIES) is a Swedish research institute at Stockholm University, founded in the early 1960s. The main objective is to produce outstanding research for publication in leading international journals. The faculty at IIES consists of 18 full time researchers and publishes on around 4 papers in the top five economics journals each year.

Scholars from the IIES have received a number of international awards, such as the Nobel Memorial Prize in Economic Sciences and the Yrjö Jahnsson Award. Among many other honors, two IIES scholars have been elected Presidents of the European Economic Association, one elected President of the Econometric Society, three elected Foreign Honorary Members of the American Academy of Arts and Sciences, and six elected members of the Royal Swedish Academy of Sciences. A number of IIES scholars hold positions on the Editorial boards of top international journals.

== Current academic staff at IIES ==
=== Professors ===
- Ingvild Almås
- Lars Calmfors
- Harry Flam
- John Hassler
- Per Krusell
- Assar Lindbeck
- Mats Persson
- Torsten Persson
- David Strömberg
- Jakob Svensson (director)
- Peter Svedberg

=== Assistant and associate professors ===
- Almut Balleer
- Tessa Bold
- Timo Boppart
- Tobias Broer
- Konrad Buchardi
- Jonathan de Quidt
- Mitch Downey
- Alexandre Kohlhas
- Kurt Mitman
- Arash Nekoei
- Peter Nilsson
- Kathrin Schlafmann
- Yimei Zou
