= Jonathan Leape =

American economist

Academic background
- Education: University of Oxford; Harvard University

Academic work
- Discipline: Development economics
- Institutions: International Growth Centre, London School of Economics

Jonathan Leape is the executive director of the International Growth Centre, and an associate professor of economics at the London School of Economics and Political Science.

His areas of research include public economics, teaching and learning in higher education, financial sector reforms, taxation, congestion charging, and capital flows. He has a PhD in Economics from Harvard University.

== Career ==
Jonathan Leape has been at the London School of Economics and Political Science since 1985. In 1990, after a request from the Minister for Foreign Affairs (Australia), he set up the Centre for Research into Economics and Finance in Southern Africa, based at the LSE.

In 2009 Jonathan Leape became the Director of LSE:100, an LSE course that introduces undergraduate students to social science. He became the executive director of the International Growth Centre in 2013.
