= Journal of the European Economic Association =

- Discipline: Economics
- Language: English
- Edited by: Romain Wacziarg

Publication details
- History: 2003–present
- Publisher: Wiley-Blackwell on behalf of the European Economic Association
- Frequency: Bimonthly
- Impact factor: 4.583 (2020)

Standard abbreviations
- ISO 4: J. Eur. Econ. Assoc.

Indexing
- ISSN: 1542-4766 (print); 1542-4774 (web)
- LCCN: 2002213978
- JSTOR: 15424766
- OCLC no.: 51003412

Links
- Journal homepage; Online access; Online archive; Journal page on association's website

The Journal of the European Economic Association is a peer-reviewed academic journal covering all aspects of economics. It was established in 2003 and is published by Wiley-Blackwell on behalf of the European Economic Association. The current managing editor is Romain Wacziarg, Professor of Economics at the University of California, Los Angeles.

According to the Journal Citation Reports, the journal has a 2020 impact factor of 4.583.
