= Iris Bohnet =

Swiss economist & academic

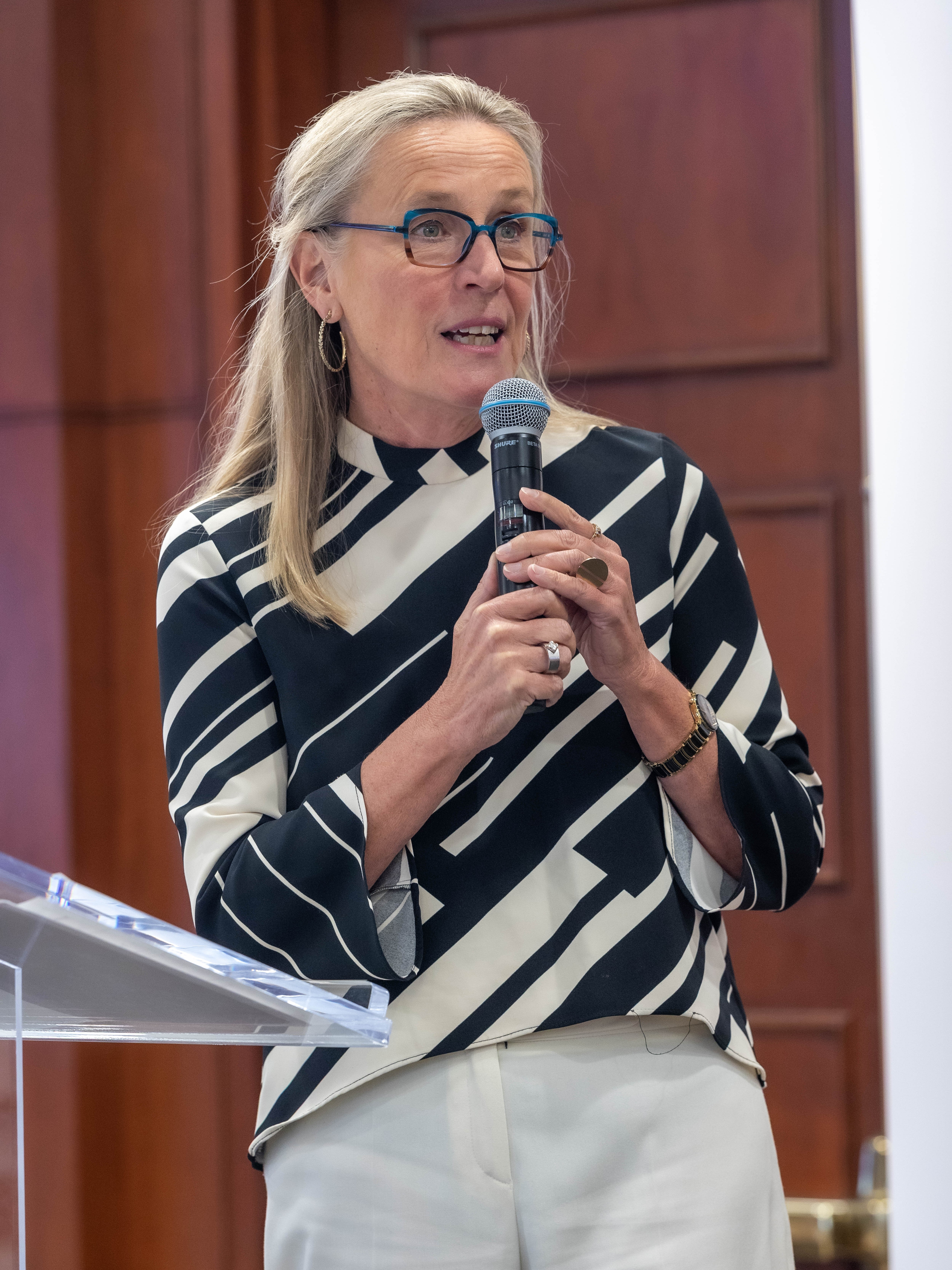
- Bohnet in 2026
- Born: March 16, 1966 (age 60); Lucerne, Switzerland

Academic background
- Education: University of Zurich (Lic. phil. I, Dr. oec. publ.)

Academic work
- Discipline: Behavioral economics
- Sub-discipline: Gender; Public policy
- Institutions: Harvard Kennedy School; Harvard Radcliffe Institute
- Notable works: What Works: Gender Equality by Design (2016); Make Work Fair (2025)
- Website: Official website

Iris Bohnet (born March 16, 1966) is a behavioral economist and the Albert Pratt Professor of Business and Government at the Harvard Kennedy School. She is co-director of the Women and Public Policy Program at Harvard Kennedy School and director of the social sciences program at the Harvard Radcliffe Institute. Her research applies insights from economics and psychology to improve decision-making in organizations and society, often with a gender or cross-cultural perspective. She is the author of What Works: Gender Equality by Design (2016) and Make Work Fair (2025), the latter coauthored with Siri Chilazi.

Bohnet served as academic dean of Harvard Kennedy School for six years. She serves as a scientific advisor to the UN Secretary-General, on the Workplace Innovation Council, and was a member of the Gender Equality Advisory Council of the G7. Since 2007, she has directed the Women and Public Policy Program at Harvard Kennedy School.

== Biography ==
=== Early life and education ===
Iris Bohnet was born in Lucerne, Switzerland, on March 16, 1966. As a child, Bohnet dreamed of becoming a teacher. She studied economics, economic history, and political science at the University of Zurich, earning a Lic. phil. I degree in 1992 (a pre-Bologna Swiss university degree roughly equivalent to a U.S. master's degree). Reflecting on her choice of study, Bohnet said, "Social considerations have always intrigued me. Studying economics and political science enabled me to understand the fundamentals." She remained at the University of Zurich to complete a doctorate in economics, receiving her Dr. oec. publ. degree in 1997 (equivalent to a U.S. Ph.D. in economics).

=== Career ===
From 1997 to 1998, Bohnet was a visiting scholar at the University of California, Berkeley. She joined the Harvard Kennedy School in 1998 as an assistant professor of public policy and was promoted to associate professor in 2003. In 2006, she became a professor, the first Swiss woman to hold a professorship at Harvard University. In 2018, she was named the Albert Pratt Professor of Business and Government.

Bohnet served as sole director of the Women and Public Policy Program at Harvard Kennedy School, one of the school's 10 research centers, from 2007 to 2018. Since 2018, she has served as the center's co-director alongside Hannah Riley Bowles. She served as academic dean from 2011 to 2014—only the second woman appointed to the position, and the first non-American—and again from 2018 to 2021. Since 2024, she has also served as director of the social sciences at the Harvard Radcliffe Institute.

Beyond academia, Bohnet has advised governments, international organizations, and private companies on gender equity. She served on the G7 Gender Equality Advisory Council during the United Kingdom's 2021 G7 presidency and is a member of the United Nations Scientific Advisory Board. She also serves on the Workplace Innovation Council, an initiative of the Aspen Institute and Pivotal that promotes evidence-based workplace innovation and gender equity.

Bohnet collaborated on the ACT (Action to Catalyze Tech) Report, an evidence-based framework for advancing diversity, equity, and inclusion in the technology sector. In 2024, the White House Office of Science and Technology Policy cited the report in Equity and Excellence 2050: A National Strategy for Progress and Prosperity as a model resource for employers and institutions.

Bohnet has been engaged with the World Economic Forum for more than a decade. She has served on the Global Agenda Council on Women's Empowerment, the Global Agenda Council on Behavior, and the Global Future Council on Behavioural Sciences, and has been faculty chair of the Young Global Leaders executive education program Global Leadership and Public Policy for the 21st Century at Harvard Kennedy School.

In 2012, Bohnet received the Julius Adams Stratton Prize for Intercultural Achievement from the American Swiss Foundation. She has also been awarded honorary doctorates by the University of Lucerne (2016), the Stockholm School of Economics (2022), and the University of Zurich (2024).

Bohnet joined the Board of Directors of the Swiss major bank Credit Suisse in 2012. Guided by her own research, she promoted greater diversity, gender equality and sustainability within the bank. However, as the longest-serving member of the Board of Directors, she also bore significant shared responsibility for the adverse developments that ultimately led to the collapse of Credit Suisse in 2023. As a member of the Compensation Committee and an expert on incentive structures, she allowed the bank, from 2013 onwards, to award compensation that was determined by the four-member committee not on the basis of objective criteria, but solely at its own discretion. This resulted in several hundred “Material Risk Takers and Controllers”, in addition to senior executives, primarily in the US investment banking business, being able to substantially increase their bonuses, even in years in which the bank recorded losses amounting to billions. Following the acquisition of Credit Suisse by UBS, which took effect on 12 June 2023, Bohnet stepped down from the Board of Directors.

== Research ==
=== Advancing gender equity through behavioral design ===
Iris Bohnet's research applies insights from behavioral economics to advance fairness at work and create equal opportunities for all. Her work focuses on redesigning organizational policies, practices, and procedures rather than attempting to change individuals.

In the book What Works: Gender Equality by Design (2016), Bohnet discusses how many conventional diversity, equity, and inclusion initiatives—particularly diversity training aimed at reducing individual bias—have produced limited empirical results. Drawing on research in behavioral economics, psychology, and organizational behavior, she proposes replacing these approaches with behavioral design: the systematic redesign of hiring, promotion, evaluation, and other workplace processes to reduce opportunities for bias. Rather than assuming individuals can simply overcome unconscious biases, Bohnet argues that organizations should create environments in which fair decisions are easier to make. The book helped popularize behavioral design as a practical framework for advancing gender equality in workplaces, winning 800-CEO-READ's 2016 Business Book of the Year and being shortlisted for the Financial Times and McKinsey Business Book of the Year Award. Its ideas also reached prominent audiences through Bohnet's appearances at venues including SXSW, the World Economic Forum meetings in Davos, and Talks at Google.

In Make Work Fair (2025), coauthored with Siri Chilazi, Bohnet extends this framework to workplace fairness more broadly. The book argues that organizations frequently mistake existing systems as meritocratic even though recruitment, promotion, performance evaluation, and compensation processes often contain hidden structural biases. Bohnet and Chilazi advocate for measuring organizational outcomes, testing interventions, and redesigning systems so that merit is assessed more fairly and consistently. Rather than treating fairness as a matter of individual intention or organizational culture alone, the book presents it as a problem of institutional design that can be addressed through evidence-based management. The book has further extended these ideas into contemporary debates about the future of work, offering organizational leaders a practical framework for pursuing fairness at a time when many employers are reassessing traditional approaches to diversity and inclusion.

==== Joint evaluation and gender bias ====
In a 2016 study published in Management Science, Bohnet, Alexandra van Geen, and Max H. Bazerman examined whether changing how candidates are evaluated could reduce gender bias in hiring, promotion, and job assignments. The researchers compared separate evaluation, in which candidates are considered individually, with joint evaluation, in which evaluators compare multiple candidates simultaneously. They found that evaluators assessing candidates separately were more likely to rely on gender stereotypes, including favoring men for stereotypically male tasks and women for stereotypically female tasks. Under joint evaluation, these gender differences disappeared and evaluators were more likely to select candidates based on their previous performance.

The authors described joint evaluation as an “evaluation nudge”: rather than attempting to eliminate evaluators' underlying biases, the intervention changes the decision-making environment so that relevant information about individual performance becomes more salient. They argued that comparative evaluation encourages more deliberative and information-based decisions and can therefore improve both gender equality and the quality of the candidates selected.

== Personal life ==
Bohnet is married to attorney Michael Zürcher. They have two sons, Dominik and Luca.

== Selected works ==
- Women and Public Policy Program at Harvard. (2026). Fairness and Meritocracy at Work: How to Be 'FAIR,' Scale Impact, and Shift Norms [Video]. YouTube. https://www.youtube.com/watch?v=eojvDrUmf9U
- Arslan, C., Chang, E. H., Chilazi, S., Bohnet, I., & Hauser, O. P. (2025). Behaviorally designed training leads to more diverse hiring. Science, 387(6732), 364–366. https://doi.org/10.1126/science.ads5258
- Bohnet, I., Hauser, O. P., & Kristal, A. S. (2025). Can gender and race dynamics in performance appraisals be disrupted? The case of social influence. Journal of Economic Behavior & Organization, 235, Article 107032. https://doi.org/10.1016/j.jebo.2025.107032
- Bohnet, I., & Saidi, F. (2019). Informational inequity aversion and performance. Journal of Economic Behavior & Organization, 159, 181–191. https://doi.org/10.1016/j.jebo.2019.02.005
- Bohnet, I., van Geen, A., & Bazerman, M. (2016). When Performance Trumps Gender Bias: Joint vs. Separate Evaluation. Management Science, 62(5), 1225–1234. https://doi.org/10.1287/mnsc.2015.2186
- Bohnet, I., Herrmann, B., & Zeckhauser, R. (2010). Trust and the Reference Points for Trustworthiness in Gulf and Western Countries. The Quarterly Journal of Economics, 125(2), 811–828. https://doi.org/10.1162/qjec.2010.125.2.811
- Greig, F., & Bohnet, I. (2009). Exploring gendered behavior in the field with experiments: Why public goods are provided by women in a Nairobi slum. Journal of Economic Behavior & Organization, 70(1), 1–9. https://doi.org/10.1016/j.jebo.2008.12.006
- Bohnet, I., Greig, F., Herrmann, B., & Zeckhauser, R. (2008). Betrayal Aversion: Evidence from Brazil, China, Oman, Switzerland, Turkey, and the United States. The American Economic Review, 98(1), 294–310. https://doi.org/10.1257/aer.98.1.294
