= International Growth Centre =

Economic research centre of London School of Economics

Coordinates: 51.51551°N 0.11533°W

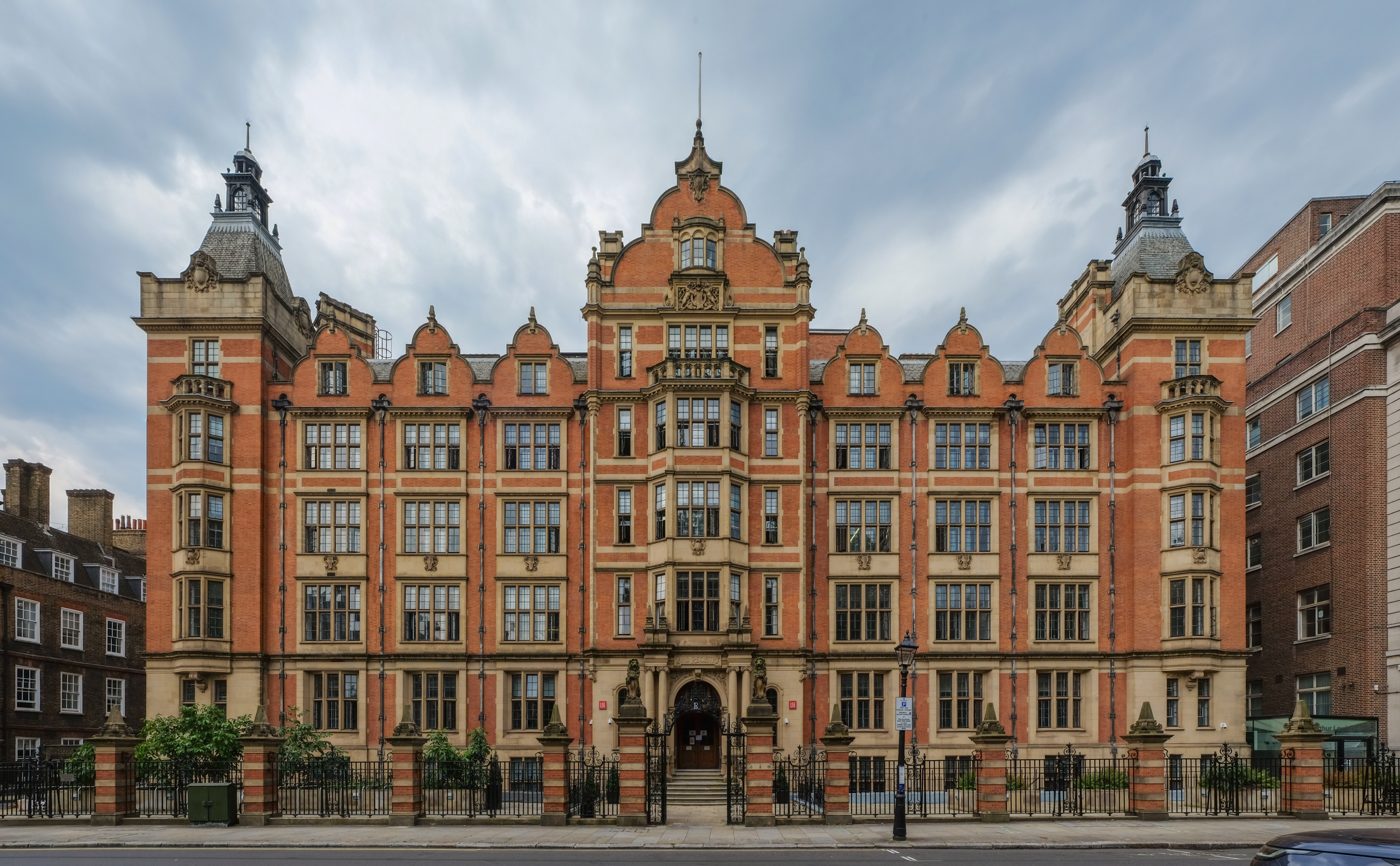
- Founded: 2008
- Type: Economic research
- Location: London, United Kingdom
- Region served: 22 countries
- Key people: Paul Collier, Robin Burgess, Anthony Venables, Jonathan Leape, Edward Glaeser, Oriana Bandiera
- Parent organization: London School of Economics, University of Oxford
- Website: theigc.org

The International Growth Centre (IGC) is an economic research centre based at the London School of Economics, operated in partnership with University of Oxford's Blavatnik School of Government.

The centre was launched in December 2008 and is funded by the UK Foreign, Commonwealth and Development Office. The IGC is led by Jonathan Leape, along with directors Robin Burgess, Sir Paul Collier, Anthony Venables, John Sutton and Chang-Tai Hsieh.

The centre runs 15 country offices in 14 partner states and directs a global network of over 1,000 researchers. IGC research is based around four research themes: state, firms, cities, and energy. These research programmes are led by 10 Research Programme Directors. Since its foundation the IGC has supported over 650 research projects. The IGC has also responded to specific government requests for advice in countries such as Malawi, Afghanistan, and Sri Lanka.

IGC country programmes are led by Country Directors working with dedicated Lead Academics, supported by locally based Country Economists. IGC country programme teams are based in the offices of think tanks or government bodies within the relevant country.

IGC researchers include Esther Duflo, Nicholas Bloom, Rachel Glennerster, Lant Pritchett, John Van Reenen, Nicholas Stern, Dean Karlan, Edward Miguel, and Maurice Obstfeld.

== Country programmes ==
For each partner country, the IGC supports a team of resident economists who respond to specific policy demands on issues of economic growth. This covers applied economic analysis, long-term research and policy engagement activities, as well as rapid responses to pressing policy questions.

The IGC Bangladesh programme was established in 2009. It is currently hosted in the BRAC University Institute of Governance and Development. The programme focuses on five areas of research: i) state effectiveness ii) firm capabilities iii) food security iv) infrastructure development, and v) sustainable urbanisation in Bangladesh. Professor Mushfiq Mobarak (Yale University and Professor Fahad Khalil (University of Washington) serve as Lead Academics for IGC Bangladesh. In 2014, IGC country researcher and former caretaker government adviser, Wahiduddin Mahmud addressed an IGC co-hosted conference at BRAC University on the issue of dysfunctional governance in Bangladesh.

The IGC Ethiopia programme was established in 2010, in partnership with the Ethiopian Development Research Institute. IGC Ethiopia focuses on the following research areas: industrial development, urbanisation, developing agriculture, youth unemployment, and state effectiveness. In 2014 IGC Ethiopia jointly sponsored a small grants scheme for junior researchers with the Ethiopian Economics Association. In 2012, a study of youth unemployment in Ethiopia was conducted by the IGC which found that whilst unemployment in urban areas remains widespread, it has declined greatly since 1999. The same study also found that women have not benefited as much as men from reductions in unemployment.

The IGC Ghana programme was initiated in 2009. It is led by Dr. Nii Sowa (Country Director), Dr. Sam Mensah (Co-Country Director), and Lead Academic and Professor Christopher Udry (Yale University). IGC Ghana has funded research in areas such as macroeconomic stability, agricultural productivity, private sector development, education and skills acquisition and natural resource management. IGC Ghana is based at the Institute of Statistical, Social and Economic Research at the University of Ghana. The IGC, in partnership with the Ministry of Finance of Ghana and the Bank of Ghana, organized the Africa Growth Forum 2014, which brought together policymakers, academics, and researchers to discuss issues relating to the Ghanaian economy.

The IGC Bihar programme was initiated in 2009. It is hosted by the Asian Development Research Institute in Patna, India. IGC Bihar has funded research on literacy, vocational training, economic policy, and public finance. In 2014, the organization organised the Bihar Growth Conference which was attended by the Chief Minister of Bihar, Jitan Ram Manjhi, who has also attended the IGC Growth Week 2014 in London.

The IGC India Central programme was launched in April 2010. The team is led by Dr. Pronab Sen (Country Director), Professor Dilip Mookherjee (Lead Academic) and Professor Eswar Prasad (Lead Academic). It is based within the Indian Statistical Institute in Delhi, India. the IGC India Central team also manages 'Ideas for India', a web-based economic and policy blog. In 2013, the IGC South Asia Growth Conference was held in Delhi which addressed schooling, public sector and programme design, macroeconomics and finance, firms and investment, and health.

The IGC Liberia programme focuses on four themes: strengthening state capabilities, natural resource management, macroeconomic management, and urbanisation. Following initial engagement in 2011 and consultations with Liberian stakeholders in 2012, IGC officially established its Liberia office in February 2013, based in the Ministry of State Without Portfolio. Liberia's Minister for Commerce and Industry, Axel M. Addy, spoke as part of IGC Growth Week 2014 in London.

The IGC Mozambique programme was established in October 2010. IGC Mozambique's research agenda has developed around three broad themes: private sector development, state effectiveness, and the development of agriculture. IGC Mozambique is directed by its two Lead Academics Dr Sandra Sequeira (London School of Economics and Political Science) and Pedro Vicente (Nova School of Business and Economics). The IGC has organized several events in Mozambique, including a workshop on management practices in the manufacturing sector, and a forum on economic growth.

The IGC Myanmar programme began in 2012. It operates in partnership with Myanmar Development Resource Institute – Centre for Economic and Social Development (MDRI-CESD) and has researched subjects including labour regulation and natural resource management. The organization has also projected revenue receipts for the Internal Revenue Department in Myanmar with its partners.

The IGC Pakistan programme was initiated in 2010. it is based within the Lahore University of Management Sciences and is guided by Dr. Ijaz Nabi (Country Director), Dr. Naved Hamid (Resident Director), Dr. Ali Cheema (Lead Academic) and Dr. Asim Khwaja (Lead Academic). The programme currently focuses on five policy areas for growth – macroeconomic management, state capabilities, firm capabilities, urbanisation and energy. It is currently working closely with the governments of Punjab, Pakistan and Khyber Pakhtunkhwa on medium-term economic planning. Research funded by the IGC into the Pakistan football-making industry found that despite supplying firms with cost-cutting technology, take-up rates of the new technology were low due to misaligned incentives between workers and the company. The organization has also funded research into low tax collection in Punjab, and successfully instituted a 'pay for performance' scheme in Punjab that raised significant tax revenue.

The IGC Rwanda programme began operations in November 2010, at the request of President Paul Kagame. It operates under a Memorandum of Understanding with the Ministry of Finance and Economic Planning (Rwanda) which requires that it "produce demand-driven research outputs that strengthen the evidence base for policy-making relevant to Rwanda’s long-run growth", with a focus on research and analysis under four main thematic areas: agriculture, infrastructure, macroeconomic policy and finance, and trade and industry. The IGC participated in a Rwanda Research Roundtable in 2014 as part of its partnership with the Rwandan government. A joint NAEB-IGC study on the Rwandan coffee sector found that Rwandan export revenues are affected by coffee washing stations operating below capacity, with the majority of the washing stations lacking funding.

The IGC Sierra Leone programme is based at the Centre of Policy Studies at the University of Sierra Leone. Its main areas of research are state capabilities, agriculture, and governance. Research conducted by the IGC has found that the number of rice traders in some Ebola-hit areas of Sierra Leone has fallen by nearly 70% between 2012 and late 2014. The economic consequences of Ebola in Sierra Leone are continuing to be monitored by the IGC.

The IGC South Sudan programme opened in August 2012. The programme is structured around three main pillars: responding to crisis, natural resource management, and addressing isolation, diversification, and job creation. The organization has published several studies regarding the oil sector in South Sudan.

The IGC Tanzania programme was established in 2008 – the first in-country programme of the IGC. The Tanzania programme is headed by Country Director Dr. John Page (Brookings Institution), Lead Academic Professor Chris Adam (University of Oxford) and Senior Country Research and Policy Fellow Dr. Pantaleo Kessy (Bank of Tanzania). IGC Tanzania's office is hosted by the Bank of Tanzania, and has so far focused on researching poverty reduction, structural transformation, preparation for monetary union, inflation and fiscal strategy. Other areas of research include firm capabilities, urbanisation, and energy. Professor John Sutton, an IGC researcher, delivered the Gilman Rutihinda Memorial Lecture at the Bank of Tanzania and urged the country to integrate local firms into gas multinational supply chains.

The IGC Uganda programme has been hosted at the Bank of Uganda since it opened in 2012. Its priority areas include natural resource management and monetary policy, the regional integration process, raising income and inclusive growth. IGC Uganda research has included analysis of integration of economic activity within the East African Community, the evolution of public expenditure priorities in light of natural resource revenues, and the options and strategies for financing fiscal deficits within the country. IGC research showed that eight out of ten Rwandan farmers in the study are not willing to adopt fertilisers as they are perceived as low quality.

The IGC Zambia programme started in 2010. It established its country office in 2011, located at the Zambian Institute for Policy Analysis and Research (ZIPAR). The IGC has collaborated with the Zambian Ministry of Health to test recruitment strategies for health workers in rural areas, which have now been implemented and scaled up by the Zambian government. The IGC has also engaged with the Zambia Revenue Authority.

== Research programmes ==
IGC research is focused within four research themes: state, firms, cities, and energy.

The IGC state research programme looks at the role of the public sector in economic development. Within the State research theme, the IGC has worked on 364 projects and organised 33 events. The state research programme is headed by Professor Oriana Bandiera (London School of Economics and Political Science), Professor Henrik Kleven (London School of Economics and Political Science), Professor Eliana La Ferrera (Bocconi University), and Professor Gerard Padro i Miquel (London School of Economics and Political Science).

One IGC state project run by Raj Chetty (Harvard University), Nasiruddin Ahmed (BRAC University), Ghulam Hossain (Chairman of the Pakistani National Board of Revenue), Ahmed Mushfiq Mobarak (Yale University), Aminur Rahman (University of Virginia), and Monica Singhal (Harvard University) looked at how social recognition can be used to increase value-added tax revenue in Pakistan. The researchers sent letters to inform firms that their tax compliance behaviour would be shared with other firms in their cluster in a subsequent letter. They hypothesised that this intervention may spur voluntary tax compliance by allowing firms to be recognised by their neighbours and peers. They found that in areas of low tax compliance, where less than 15% of firms paid any VAT the previous year (in 2012), the peer recognition treatment had no significant effect on tax payment rates. However, in areas where at least 15% of firms had paid VAT in 2012, firms who received the peer recognition treatment were 3.4 percentage points more likely to make a payment in the post-intervention period

The IGC firms research programme seeks to understand the forces that determine the productivity of firms. Within the Firms research theme, the IGC has worked on 293 projects and organised 25 events. The IGC's Firms research programme is headed by Professor Nicholas Bloom (Stanford University), Professor Tavneet Suri (MIT Sloan School of Management), Professor Christopher Udry (Yale University), Professor Eric Verhoogen (Columbia University), Dr Greg Fischer (London School of Economics and Political Science), Professor Imran Rasul (University College London), Professor Andres Rodriguez-Clare (University of California, Berkeley), and Professor Christopher Woodruff (University of Warwick).

An IGC firms project in Sialkot, Pakistan, one of the world's top producers of footballs, found that employees in factories producing footballs resisted a new technology that limited waste and improved efficiency. Researchers found a new way to cut the footballs' pentagon panels from sheets of rexine, and they provided football manufacturers with a new cutting pattern and new cutting tools to implement the new design. While one of the largest companies in the city quickly adopted the new technology for almost all its production, few others followed suit. Based on further investigation, the researchers conjectured that take-up was slow because employees were resisting the new technology. Cutters were paid per piece, with no incentive to reduce waste, and were concerned that the new die would slow them down and reduce their incomes.

The IGC cities research programme explores the challenges of urbanisation in the developing world and the potential of cities to act as drivers of economic growth. The IGC's cities research programme is led by Edward Glaeser (Harvard University) and Gharad Bryan (London School of Economics and Political Science). 45 projects and nine events have been funded through the IGC cities programme.

The IGC energy research programme analyses the role that energy plays in shaping the growth of developing countries. Within the Energy research theme, the IGC has worked on 55 projects and organised four events. The energy programme is headed by Professor Michael Greenstone (Massachusetts Institute of Technology) and Professor Nicholas Ryan (Yale University).

== Events ==
The IGC holds a number of events throughout the year with the purpose of discussing a wide range of economic growth-related issues, sharing the findings of its research, and stimulating policy debates within the IGC's four thematic focus areas: cities, energy, state effectiveness, and firms.

IGC events focus on combining research and policy and feature speakers from IGC's network of researchers and policymakers from Africa and South Asia.

The IGC's flagship events are "Growth Week", its annual conference in London, and a series of smaller regional and thematic conferences held in the UK, Africa, and South Asia with the aim of forging collaborations between policymakers and academics.

In addition, a number of in-country research dissemination and policy events and workshops are held every year. The IGC also holds a number of public lectures at the London School of Economics and Political Science.
