= European Economic Association =

Learned society for economists

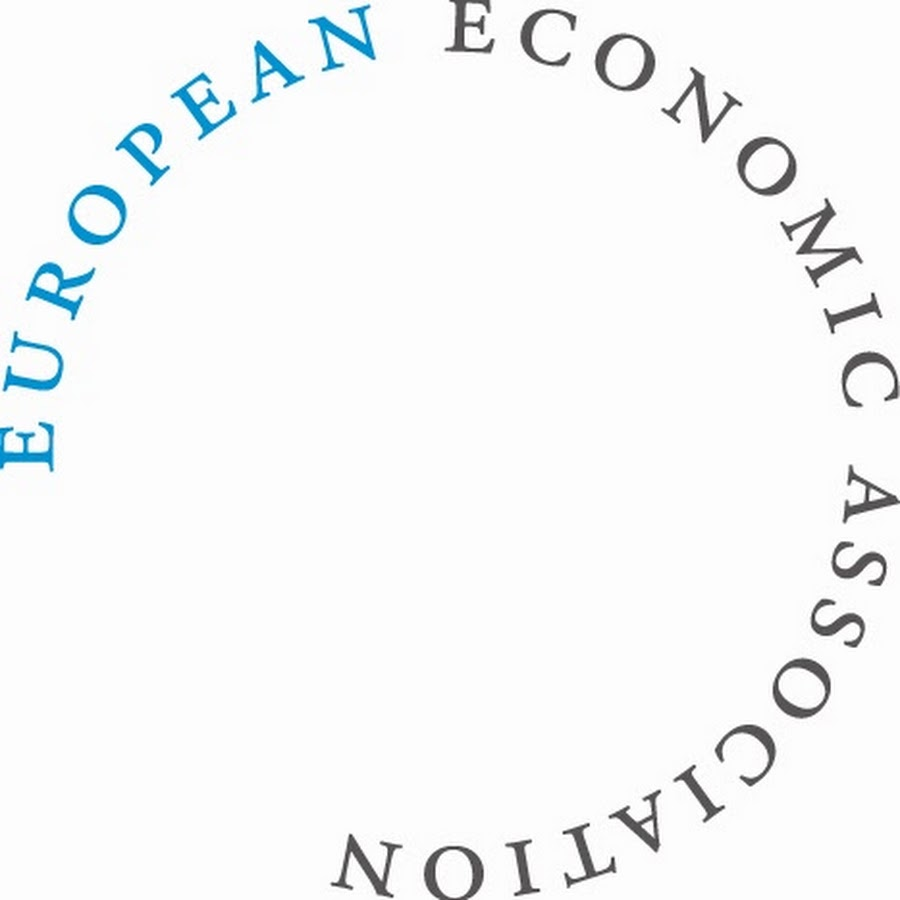
- Formation: 1986
- Legal status: Learned society in economics
- Purpose: Contribute to the development and application of economics as a science in Europe
- Headquarters: Tessenderlo, Belgium
- Region served: Europe
- Members: 4,200
- President: Imran Rasul
- Main organ: Executive Committee
- Website: www.eeassoc.org

The European Economic Association (EEA) is a professional academic body which links European economists. It was founded in the mid-1980s. Its first annual congress was in 1986 in Vienna and its first president was Jacques Drèze. The current president is Imran Rasul. The Association currently has around 4000 members. Its objectives are:

". . . to contribute to the development and application of economics as a science in Europe; to improve communication and exchange between teachers, researchers and students in economics in the different European countries; and to develop and sponsor co-operation between teaching institutions of university level and research institutions in Europe "

It publishes the Journal of the European Economic Association. In August of each year the Association, in collaboration with the Econometric Society organises a congress in a European city. The congress attracts around 1500 participants.

== Association presidents ==
Presidents, European Economic Association (EEA)
Term of Office	Name of President	Country
1986	Jacques Drèze (1929–2022)	Belgium
1987	János Kornai (1928–2021)	Hungary
1988	Edmond Malinvaud (1923–2015)	France
1989	Tony Atkinson (1944–2017)	United Kingdom
1990	Agnar Sandmo (1938–2019)	Norway
1991	Assar Lindbeck (1930–2020)	Sweden
1992	Martin Hellwig (born 1949)	Germany
1993	Mervyn King (born 1948)	United Kingdom
1994	Roger Guesnerie (born 1943)	France
1995	Louis Phlips (born 1933)	Belgium
1996	David Newbery (born 1943)	United Kingdom
1997	Reinhard Selten (1930–2016)	Germany
1998	Jean-Jacques Laffont (1947–2004)	France
1999	Partha Dasgupta (born 1942)	India; United Kingdom
2000	James Mirrlees (1936–2018)	United Kingdom
2001	Jean Tirole (born 1953)	France
2002	J. Peter Neary (1950–2021)	Ireland
2003	Torsten Persson (born 1954)	Sweden
2004	Richard Blundell (born 1952)	United Kingdom
2005	Mathias Dewatripont (born 1959)	Belgium
2006	Andreu Mas-Colell (born 1944)	Spain
2007	Guido Tabellini (born 1956)	Italy
2008	Ernst Fehr (born 1956)	Austria; Switzerland
2009	Nicholas Stern (born 1946)	United Kingdom
2010	Tim Besley (born 1960)	United Kingdom
2011	Christopher Pissarides (born 1948)	Cyprus
2012	Jordi Galí (born 1961)	Spain
2013	Manuel Arellano (born 1957)	Spain
2014	Orazio Attanasio (born 1959)	Italy
2015	Rachel Griffith (born 1963)	United Kingdom; United States
2016	Fabrizio Zilibotti (born 1964)	Italy
2017	Philippe Aghion (born 1956)	France
2018	Eliana La Ferrara (born 1968)	Italy
2019	Kjetil Storesletten (born 1967)	Norway
2020	Per Krusell (born 1959)	Sweden
2021	Silvana Tenreyro (born 1973)	Argentina; United Kingdom
2022	Oriana Bandiera (born 1971)	Italy
2023	Maristella Botticini (born ----)	Italy
2024	Jan Eeckhout (born 1970)	Belgium
2025	Hélène Rey (born 1970)	France
2026	Imran Rasul (born 1974)	Pakistan; United Kingdom
