= Department of Economics, University of Oxford =

Department of Oxford University

Department of Economics
- Established: 1999; 27 years ago
- Head of Department: Johannes Abeler
- Academic staff: 50
- Location: Manor Road Building, Manor Road, Oxford, United Kingdom
- Website: economics.ox.ac.uk

The Department of Economics is an academic department at the Social Sciences Division at the University of Oxford in Oxford, England, United Kingdom.

Relatively recently founded in 1999, the department is located in the Norman Foster-designed Manor Road Building.

== History of Economics in Oxford ==
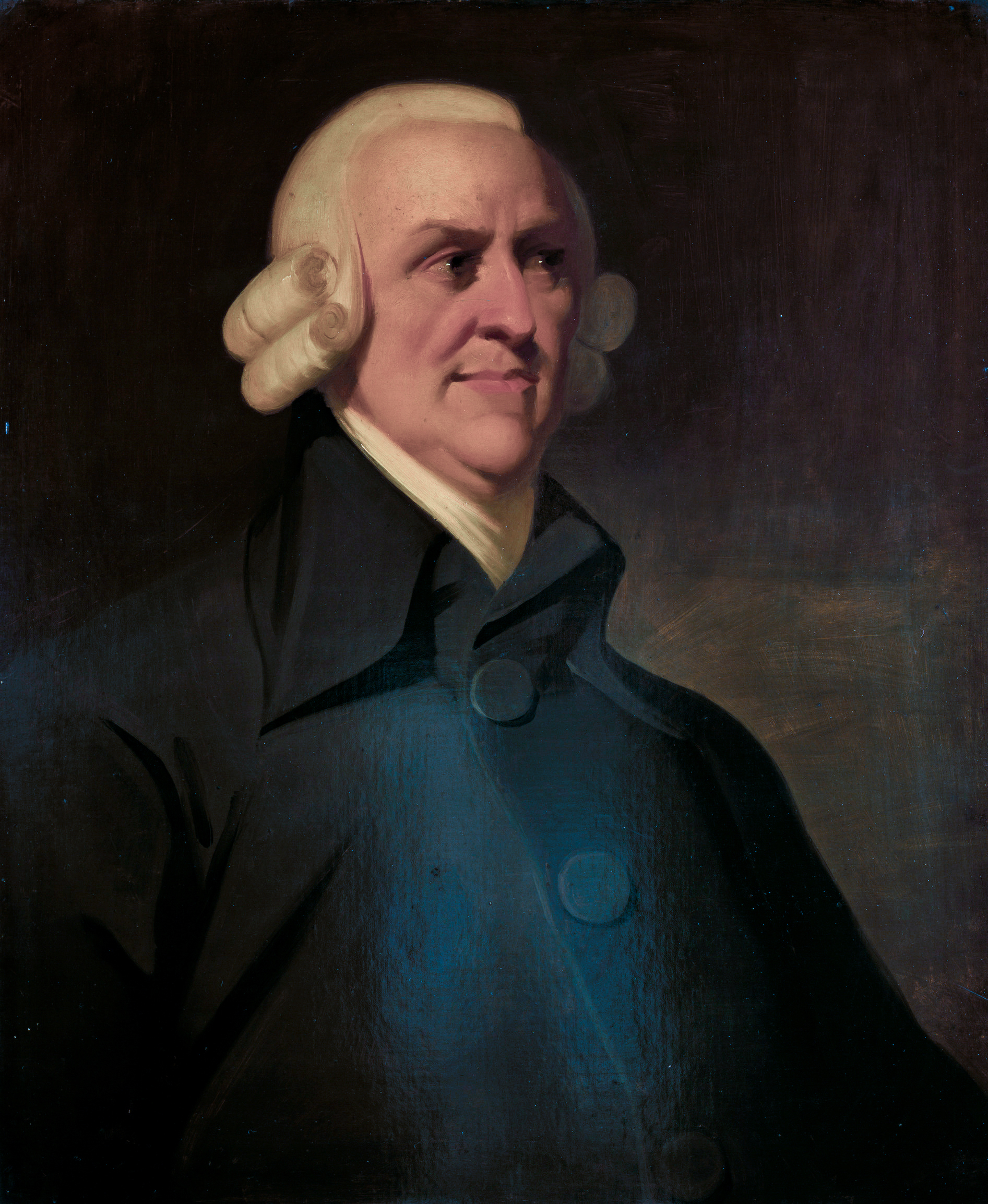
Adam Smith pursued graduate studies at Balliol College in 1740.

Despite the department's relatively recent establishment, Oxford has a long history within Economics.

The 19th century saw an expansion of economics within Oxford, with political economy being offered as an option to Greats students, and the Drummond Chair in Political Economy being established in 1825 at All Souls College, first being held by Nassau William Senior. Other notable 19th century Oxford economists include Arnold Toynbee, Francis Ysidro Edgeworth.

The 20th century saw the first economics programme, a postgraduate Diploma in Economics, in 1904. Economics was later introduced as part of a degree programme as part of the “modern greats” course in 1920, later Philosophy, Politics and Economics. Economist L.L. Price argued that this emphasised Oxford's stance of treating economics “pretty.. but unimportant”. 20th century Oxford economists include Sir Roy Harrod, Jacob Marschak, Nicholas Stern, Sir David Hendry, Stephen Nickell, David Soskice, Tim Harford, and Mark Carney.

=== Nobel Prizes ===
Oxford recipients of the Nobel award of Economics

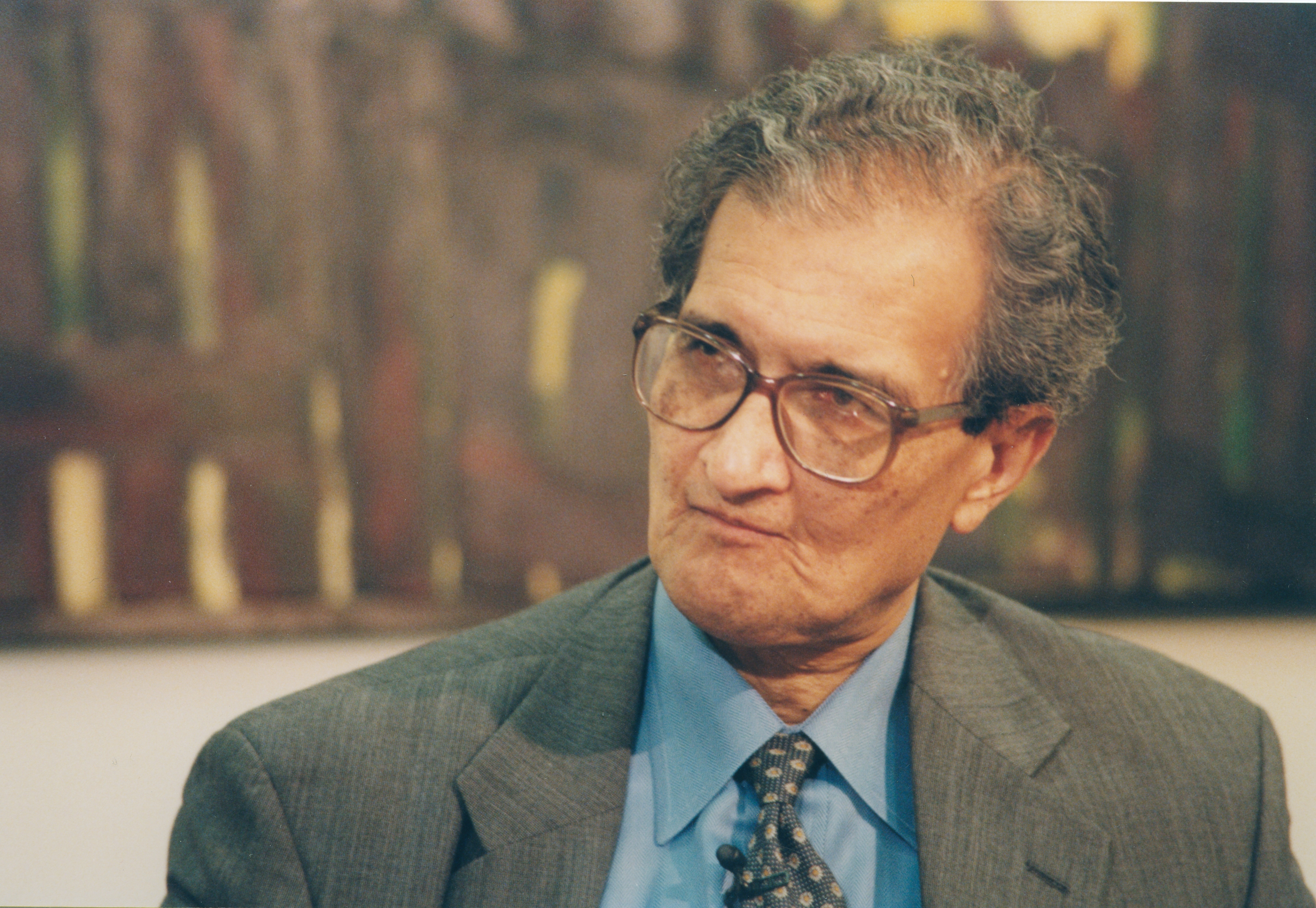
Amartya Sen (1998)

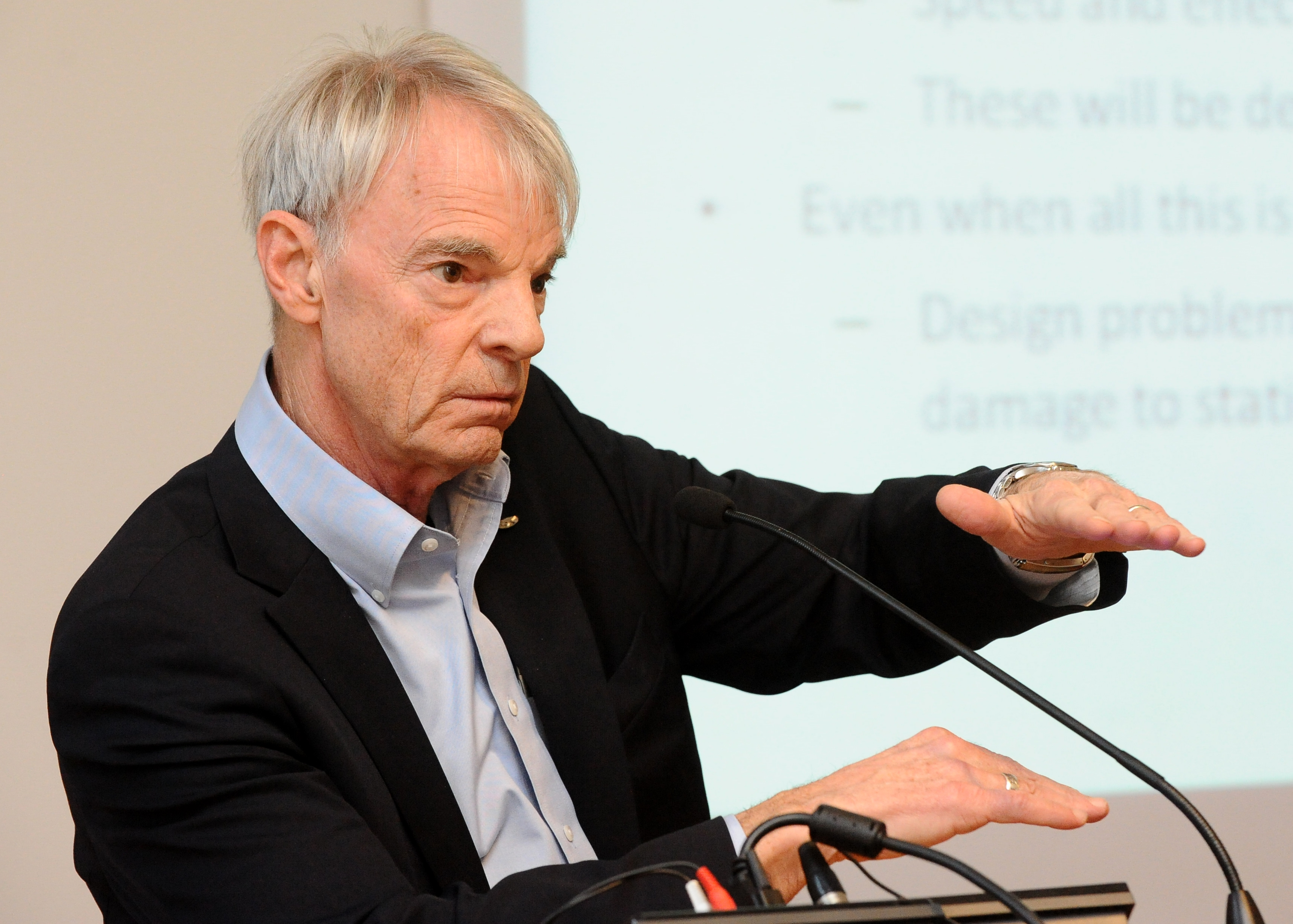
Michael Spence (2001)

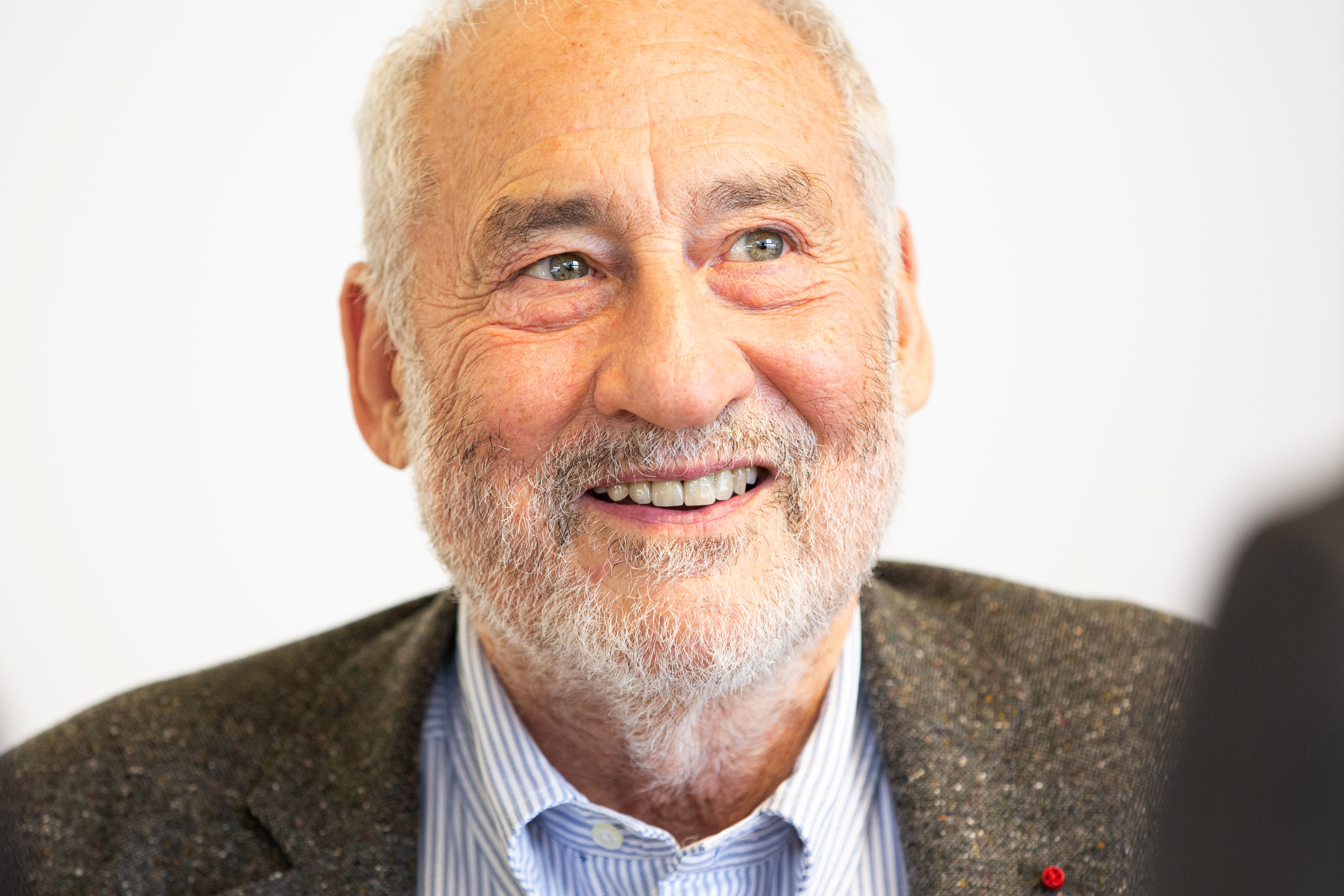
Joseph Stiglitz (2001)

Ten academics affiliated with Oxford have won the Nobel Memorial Prize in Economic Sciences:

- Sir John Hicks (1972; MA, Balliol; Drummond Professor of Political Economy)
- Gunnar Myrdal (1974; Fellow of Balliol)
- James Meade (1977; MA, Oriel)
- Lawrence Klein (1980; Lincoln)
- Robert Solow (1987; George Eastman Visiting Professor; Fellow of Balliol)
- Sir James Mirrlees (1996; Edgeworth Professor of Economics; Fellow of Nuffield)
- Amartya Sen (1998; Fellow of Nuffield; Drummond Professor of Political Economy; Fellow of All Souls)
- Michael Spence (2001; Rhodes Scholar; MA, Magdalen)
- Joseph Stiglitz (2001; Drummond Professor of Political Economy; Fellow of All Souls, Visiting Fellow of St Catherine's)
- Philippe Aghion (2025; Fellow of Nuffield College)

== Courses ==
The department offers three undergraduate courses in economics, but notably no straight economics option:

- BA History & Economics, run jointly with the History Faculty
- BA Economics & Management, run jointly with the Saïd Business School
- BA Philosophy, Politics & Economics, run jointly with the Philosophy Faculty, and Politics Department

At graduate level, the department offers six courses:

- MSc Economics for Development, jointly offered by the Department of International Development
- MSc Financial Economics, jointly offered by the Saïd Business School
- MSc Economic and Social History, jointly offered by the Faculty of History
- MPhil in Economics and Social History, jointly offered by the Faculty of History
- MPhil Economics
- DPhil Economics

== Research ==
In the 2014 Research Excellence Framework (REF2014), the Department received an overall grade-point average of 3.44 (out of 4) - the third highest of any department in Economics and Econometrics in the UK, behind UCL and the London School of Economics.

=== Research groups and centres ===
The department currently houses nine research groups, and is involved with five different research centres:

Research groups:

- Applied Economics
- Behavioural economics
- Development economics
- Econometrics
- Economic history
- International trade
- Macroeconomics
- Microeconomic theory
- Resources and the environment

Research centres:

- Centre for the Study of African Economies (CSAE) — directed by Stefan Dercon
- Oxford Centre for the Analysis of Resource-Rich economies (OxCarre) — directed by Anthony Venables
- Economic Modelling (EMoD) at the Institute for New Economic Thinking (INET)
- Urbanising in Developing Countries — directed by Anthony Venables, jointly with the London School of Economics
- International Growth Centre

== Rankings ==
In the 2021 Complete University Guide, the programme is ranked second nationally, behind the University of Cambridge.

The Tilburg University Economics Ranking is a worldwide ranking of Economics schools based on research contribution placing Oxford second in Europe, and 11th globally. Similarly, the Academic Ranking of World Universities sees Oxford place third in Europe, and 15th globally.

The 2020 Times Higher Education World University Rankings places Oxford first in the UK, and third globally.

In the 2020 QS World University Rankings by subject, Oxford is ranked second in Europe, and ninth globally for Economics & Econometrics.

== Notable current and former faculty ==
Current and former faculty includes the Director of Policy Research at the World Bank, Chief Economists at the Department for International Development, and Members of the Monetary Policy Committee, among many other prominent roles.

- Mark Armstrong
- Vincent Crawford
- Ian Crawford
- Stefan Dercon
- Martin Ellison
- Beata Javorcik
- Paul Klemperer
- Margaret A. Meyer
- J. Peter Neary
- Kevin W. S. Roberts
- Rick van der Ploeg
- Anthony Venables CBE
- Sir John Vickers

== Notable former faculty ==
- Andrew Graham
- Sir David Hendry
- John Muellbauer
- Frances Stewart
- David Vines
- Peyton Young

== See also ==
- Faculty of Economics, University of Cambridge
- UCL Department of Economics
- London School of Economics
