= Bourgeois of Paris =

Member of a feudal corporation or guild in Paris during the French monarchy

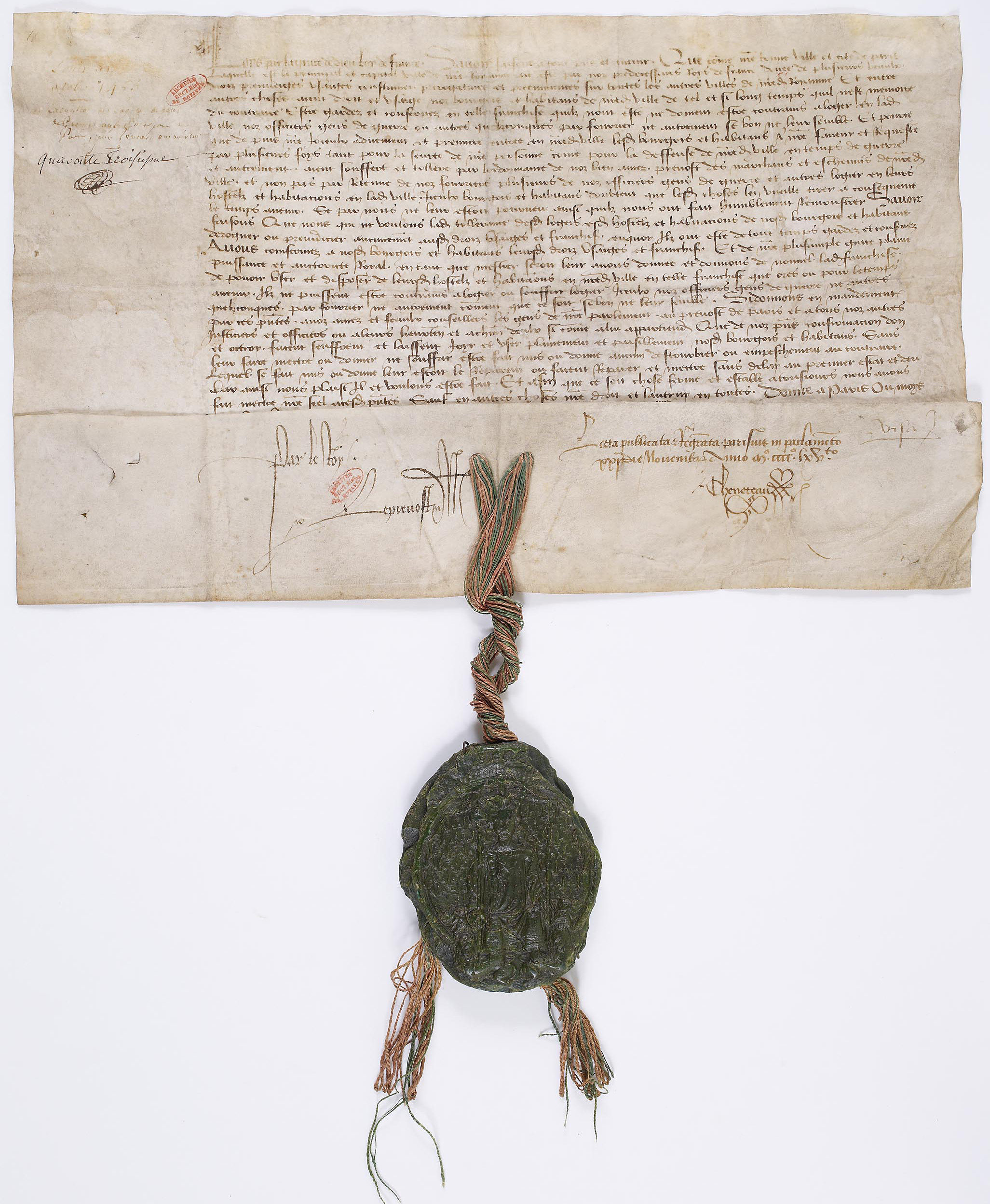
Edict of Louis XI confirming the privileges of the Bourgeois of Paris, National Archives, AE-II-478.

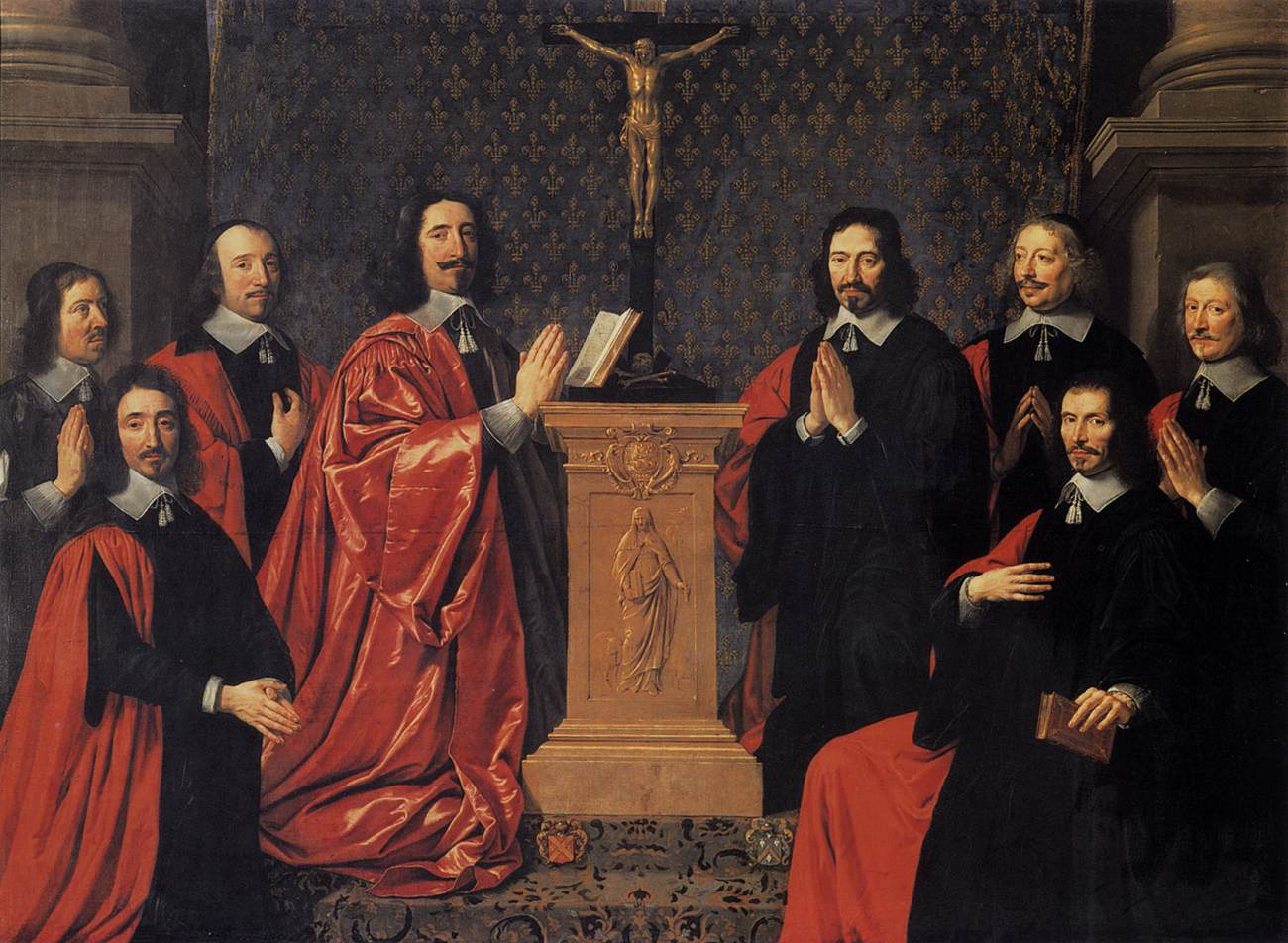
The échevins of Paris, by Philippe de Champaigne, 1648

A bourgeois of Paris was traditionally a member of one of the corporations or guilds that existed under the Ancien Régime. According to Article 173 of the Custom of Paris, a bourgeois had to possess a domicile in Paris as a tenant or owner for at least a year and a day. This qualification was also required for public offices such as provost of the merchants, alderman or consul, but unlike the bourgeois or citizens of other free cities, Parisians did not need letters of bourgeoisie to prove their status.

A bourgeois of Paris had privileges as well as duties. While they were exempt from paying the taille, they were required to pay the city taxes, contribute to a public charity, arm themselves at their own expense, and join the urban militia.

== Definition ==
According to article 173 (previously 129) of the Custom of Paris, the "right of the Bourgeoisie" can be attained in Paris by any person "living and residing there for a year and a day." "Living and residing" meant having a personal home and staying there continuously with family as opposed to making temporary stays for business; this was proven by a receipt of rent or personal capitation. Renting a room or staying in a furnished hotel was not considered. Unlike the bourgeois or citizens of other free cities, Parisians did not need letters of bourgeoisie to prove their status.

Anyone who owned a home in Paris intra-muros as an owner or tenant and had resided there for over a year was considered a bourgeois of Paris. There were no other conditions such as heritage or an oath, unlike in Brussels at the same period.

== Duties and privileges of the Bourgeois of Paris ==
The privileges of the Bourgeois of Paris were numerous and diverse and varied greatly from decade to decade. The list published in 1884 in L'Intermédiaire des chercheurs et curieux (The Intermediate of the Researchers and Curious) gives a glimpse into the variety of these privileges. Laurence Croq, who dedicated a thesis to studying the Bourgeois of Paris in the 18th century, explains that this status had a polymorphous characteristic.

The first privilege of the Bourgeois of Paris was being allowed their own set of customary rules: the Coutume de Paris.

The second privilege of the Bourgeois of Paris was the right for merchants to be organized into bodies. These bodies received certain privileges from the king, such as the right to have a seal, a common fund, and a "parlor for Bourgeois" (city hall); the right to defend itself, to close itself, and to administer itself; and the right to have its own justice and its own police force.

=== Privilege of jurisdiction ===
According to Article 112 of the Custom of Paris, the Bourgeois of Paris cannot be forced to plead in defense anywhere other than Paris, including in civil matters for purely real rights.

=== Fiscal privileges ===
Fiscal privileges were numerous; those maintained until the Meeting of the Estates-General in 1789 included:

- Exemption from the Taille, including income from property in the countryside in the jurisdiction of the Vicomté de Paris (the Bourgeois of Versailles, Poissy, Lyons, Amiens, Bordeaux, and several other large cities had the same privilege);
- Exemption from the right of freehold, granted by Charles VI in July 1409 and suppressed by Louis XV;
- Right to wholesale the wine of one's own home without the ministry of jurés-crieurs and without being required to register the sale, and to import it into Paris without paying the tariffs;
- Exemption from the mortmain and the right of mortmain on a property in mortmain throughout the kingdom.

=== Some privileges identical to those of the Nobility ===
The Bourgeois of Paris were given some privileges almost equal to the nobility's, the oldest being the exemption from mortmain, from the Taille, and freehold to benefit from the noble guard. At an early period, the Bourgeois of Paris received the right to wear a helmet and/or crested coats of arms and to carry a sword from King Charles V.

According to Chateaubriand, "Charles V granted letters of nobility to all the Bourgeois of Paris; Charles VI, Louis XI, Francis I, and Henry II confirmed these letters of nobility. Paris was never a commune because it was franc by the mere presence of the king." Henry III restricted this privilege in 1577 to the Provost of the Merchants and the Aldermen alone. It was suppressed in 1667, restored in 1707, suppressed again in 1715, and finally restored in 1716, which remained until the end of the Ancien Régime.

The Bourgeois of Paris also enjoyed the right to the noble guard, who were called the Bourgeois Guard when serving them.

== Birth of the bourgeoisie in Paris ==
The oldest corporations or guilds in Paris were the clothiers, grocers, haberdashers, and furriers.

The water merchants, heirs of the "nautes de Lutèce", monopolised the Basilica of Saint-Denis and the Grande Boucherie (lit. Big Butchery) and constituted a third power along with the clergy and the French nobility that consecrated the Great Ordinance of the provost of merchants in 1357

In 1190, before leaving for a crusade, King Philippe Auguste wrote his will and placed six "loyal men" at the head of the provosts: Thibaut Le Riche, Athon de Greve, Evrouin Le Changeur, Robert de Chartres, Baudouin Bruneau and Nicolas Boucel.

The Livre des métiers (Book of trades) and the Livre de la taille (Book of the taille), written under provost Étienne Boileau, allow readers to learn about the rising status of the Bourgeoisie. Holders of registered occupations were considered to be Bourgeois.

During the 13th century, numerous Bourgeois dynasties were built, including the Sarrazins, Barbettes, Bourdonnais (see rue des Bourdonnais), and Pisdoe or Pizdoue.

== Bourgeois of Paris families still in existence today ==
=== 13th century ===
- Pizdoe family, four provosts of the merchants of Paris. Many aldermen. In the history of the capital, it was the dynasty that ruled Paris during the longest period. The Pédoüe was also one of the principal landowners of Paris in the thirteenth and fourteenth centuries.
- Bourdon family from the rue des Bourdonnais. Two provosts of the merchants.
- Marcel family, one provost of merchants: Étienne Marcel, provost of the merchants of Paris and a participant in the Jacquerie revolt. Several aldermen.
- Cocatrix family, a provost of merchants. Several aldermen.
- Sarrazin family, a provost of the merchants. Several aldermen.
- Barbette family, Étienne Barbette, provost of merchants of Paris. Several aldermen. Rue Barbette was created in the 16th century on one of their properties.

=== 16th century ===
- Cochin family, politicians, a prefect, historians. Founders of the Cochin Hospital.

=== 17th century ===
- Chebron family, Sieur de Bonnegarde and Cardonne. Councillor of the King in the election of Paris. Hereditary Office of Comptroller General, former triennial of the seventh part of the Annuities of the Town Hall. Letters of the Bourgeoisie. Anointed on July 24, 1697.
- de Lens family (goldsmiths of Philippe I, Duke of Orléans.), also Bourgeois of Brussels.
- Martin de Bussy and Martin de Boulancy families.
- de Silvestre family.
- Vandive family, a branch of the van Dievoet family, Bourgeois of Brussels.
- Bruté de Rémur family, silk merchants.

=== 18th century ===
- Simonneau-Dubreuil family (1776). Rue des Saints-Pères (related to the family of Saunières, including Henry de Saunières, commissioner of sizes and militia steward of Limoges around 1740).
- Billon family (1702)
- Gaudart family
- Rocquet family
- Chebrou family (1770). Also Bourgeois of Niort (see Chebrou families de La Merichère, Chebrou de Beugnon Chebrou La Foucardière, Chebrou des Loges Chebrou Brush, Chebrou Lespinats, Chebrou La Rouliere, Chebrou Petit-Château and all collateral family ties).
- Chevauché family (filiation followed since 1687, documented as Bourgeois of Paris since 17317).
- Marguet family, from which the theater actor Amant is born.
- de Villiers family, Jean de Villiers (1712-1786) descendants of painters.
- de Gisors family, cousin of the de Villiers family, descendants of architects.
- Louis family, Claude Germain Louis Devilliers.
- Maillé family, at the origin of the Royal Manufacture of Spalme.

== See also ==
=== Bibliography ===
- Laurence Croq, Les « Bourgeois de Paris » au XVIIIe siècle : identification d'une catégorie sociale polymorphe, thèse de doctorat en histoire, Université de Paris-I, 1998 ISBN 2-7295-2567-X.
- Jean Favier, Le Bourgeois de Paris au Moyen Âge, Éditions Tallandier, 2012, 670 p. ISBN 978-2847348453.
- Mathieu Marraud, De la Ville à l'État. La Bourgeoisie parisienne -XVIIe et XVIIIe siècles, Paris, Albin Michel, coll. « Bibliothèque Histoire », 2009, 552p. ISBN 978-2-226-18707-9.
- Mathieu Marraud, La Noblesse de Paris au XVIIIe siècle, Paris, Le Seuil, 2000, 576 p. ISBN 978-2020372107.
- Bonneserre de Saint-Denis, Armorial du Parlement de Paris, 1862.

=== See also ===
- History of Paris
- Bourgeois of Brussels
- Bourgeoisie of Geneva
- Seven Noble Houses of Brussels
- Guilds of Brussels
- Étienne Boileau
- Etienne Marcel
- Cabochien revolt
- Israel Silvestre
- Van Dievoet family

== Authority ==
Content in this edit is translated from the existing French Wikipedia article at fr: Bourgeois de Paris; see its history for attribution.
