= Dercon =

Dercon is a surname. Notable people with the surname include:

- Chris Dercon (born 1958), Belgian art historian, curator, and museum director
- Stefan Dercon (fl. 1985), Belgian-British economist
