= Professor Edgeworth =

Professor Edgeworth may refer to:

- Francis Ysidro Edgeworth (1845–1926), Drummond Professor of Political Economy at Oxford University
- A fictional pseudonym of Time Lord Azmael in The Twin Dilemma, a Doctor Who story
- The Edgeworth Professor of Economics at Oxford University
