= Guilds in medieval Europe =

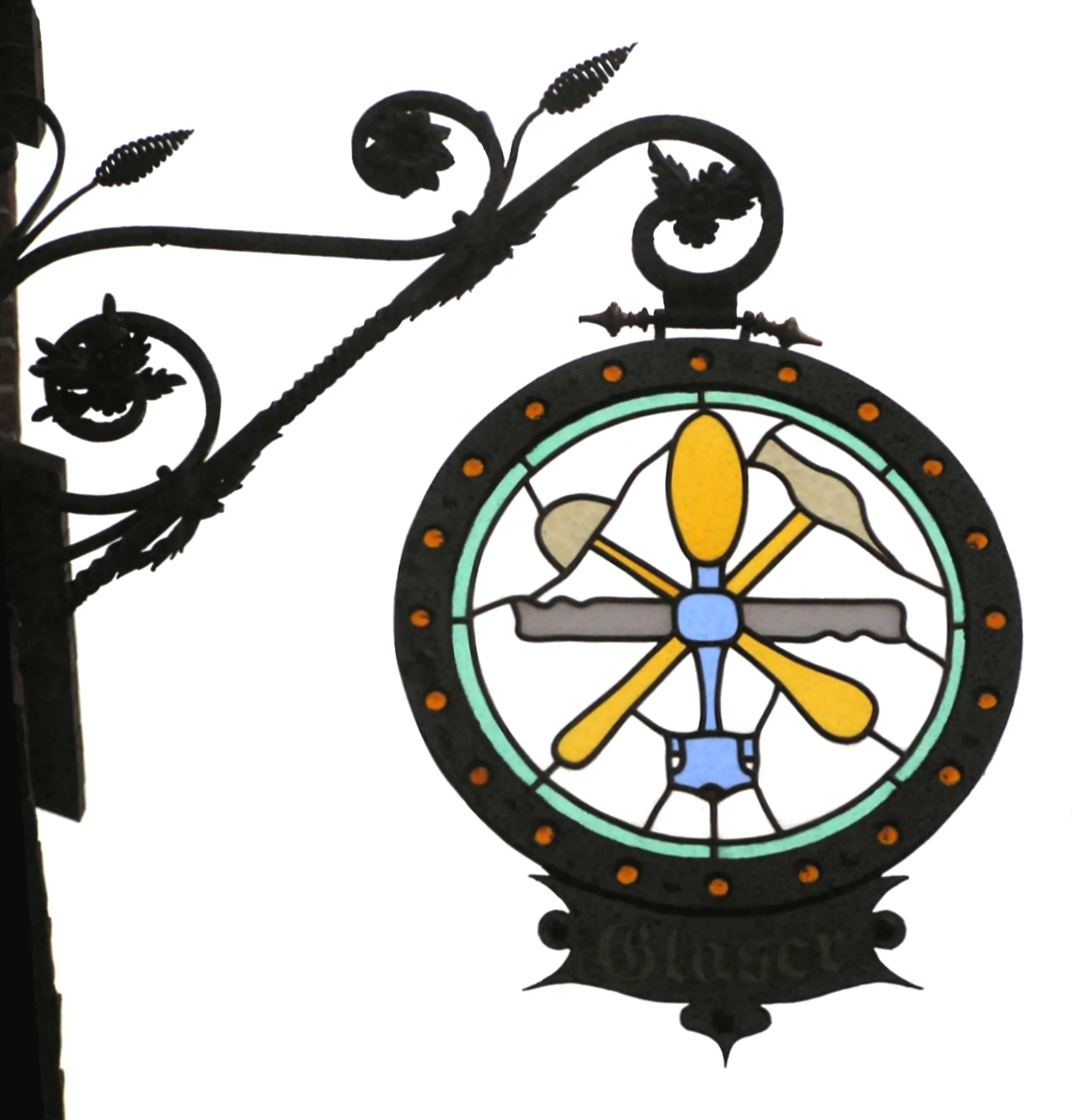
Traditional hand-forged guild sign of a glazier — in Germany. These signs can be found in many old European towns where guild members marked their places of business. Many survived through time or staged a comeback in industrial times. Today they are restored or newly created, especially in old town areas.

Guilds in medieval Europe were associations of craftsmen, merchants, or other skilled workers that emerged across Europe to regulate trade, maintain standards, and protect the economic and social interests of their members. These organizations developed into influential institutions that shaped urban economies, oversaw apprenticeships and professional conduct, and often held significant political authority within their towns. Guilds varied widely—from powerful merchant guilds to specialized craft guilds—and their legacy can still be seen today in surviving traditions, historical buildings, and the organizational models that influenced modern trade regulation and professional associations.

There were several types of guilds, including the two main categories of merchant guilds and craft guilds but also the frith guild and religious guild. Guilds arose beginning in the High Middle Ages as craftsmen united to protect their common interests.

They sometimes depended on grants of letters patent from a monarch or other ruler to enforce the flow of trade to their self-employed members, and to retain ownership of tools and the supply of materials, but most were regulated by the local government. Guild members found guilty of cheating the public would be fined or banned from the guild. A lasting legacy of traditional guilds are the guildhalls constructed and used as guild meeting-places.

An important result of the guild framework was the emergence of universities at Bologna (established in 1088), Oxford (at least since 1096) and Paris (c. 1150); they originated as scholastic guilds of students (as at Bologna) or of masters (as at Paris).

== Origin ==
In the Early Middle Ages, most of the Roman craft organisations, originally formed as religious confraternities, had disappeared, with the apparent exceptions of stonecutters and perhaps glassmakers, mostly the people that had local skills. Gregory of Tours tells a miraculous tale of a builder whose art and techniques suddenly left him, but were restored by an apparition of the Virgin Mary in a dream. Michel Rouche remarks that the story speaks for the importance of practically transmitted journeymanship.

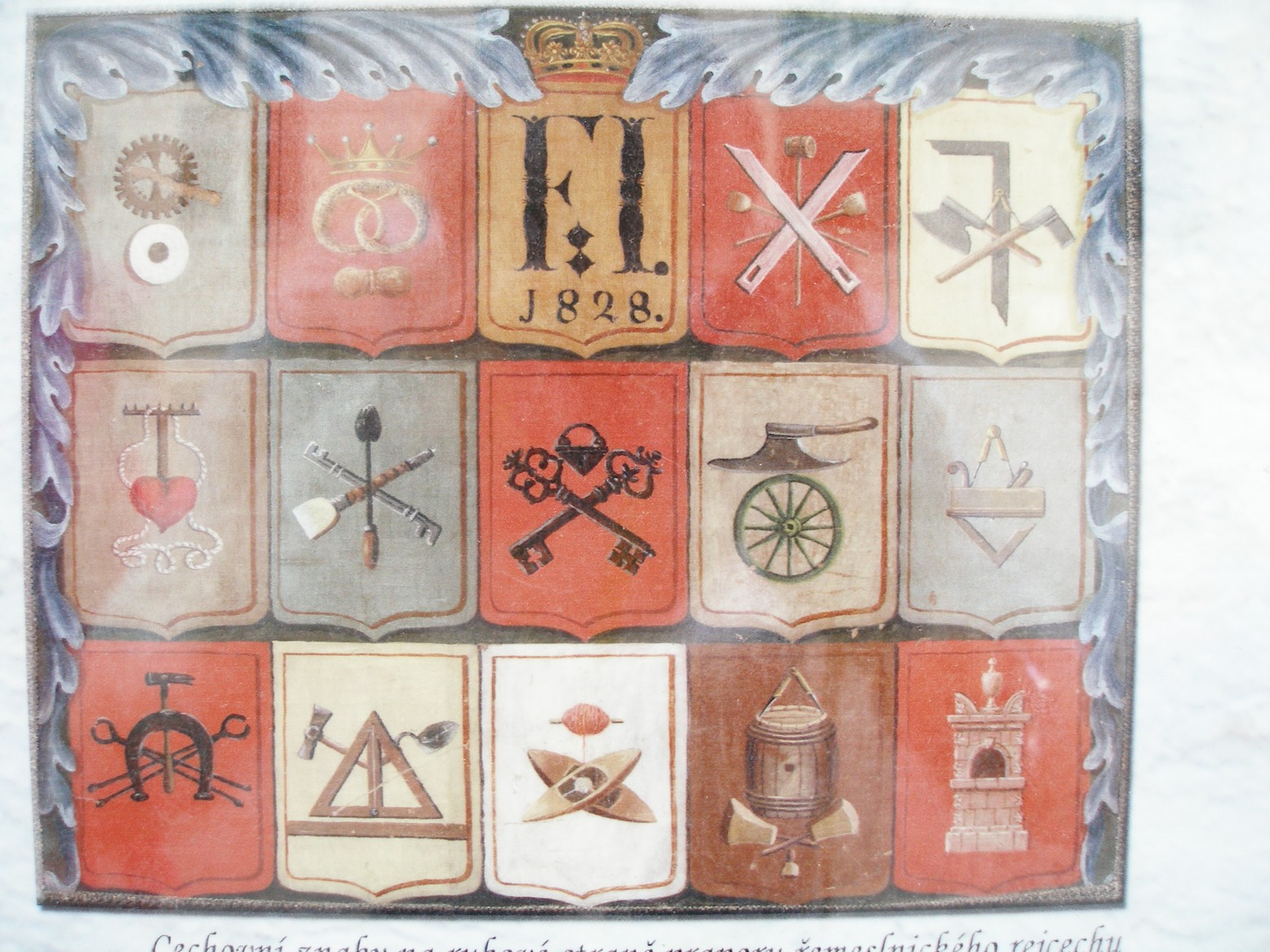
Coats of arms of guilds in a town in the Czech Republic displaying symbols of various European medieval trades and crafts

Early egalitarian communities called "guilds" were denounced by Catholic clergy for their "conjurations" — the binding oaths sworn among the members to support one another in adversity, kill specific enemies, and back one another in feuds or in business ventures. The occasion for these oaths were drunken banquets held on December 26. In 858, West Francian Bishop Hincmar sought vainly to Christianise the guilds.

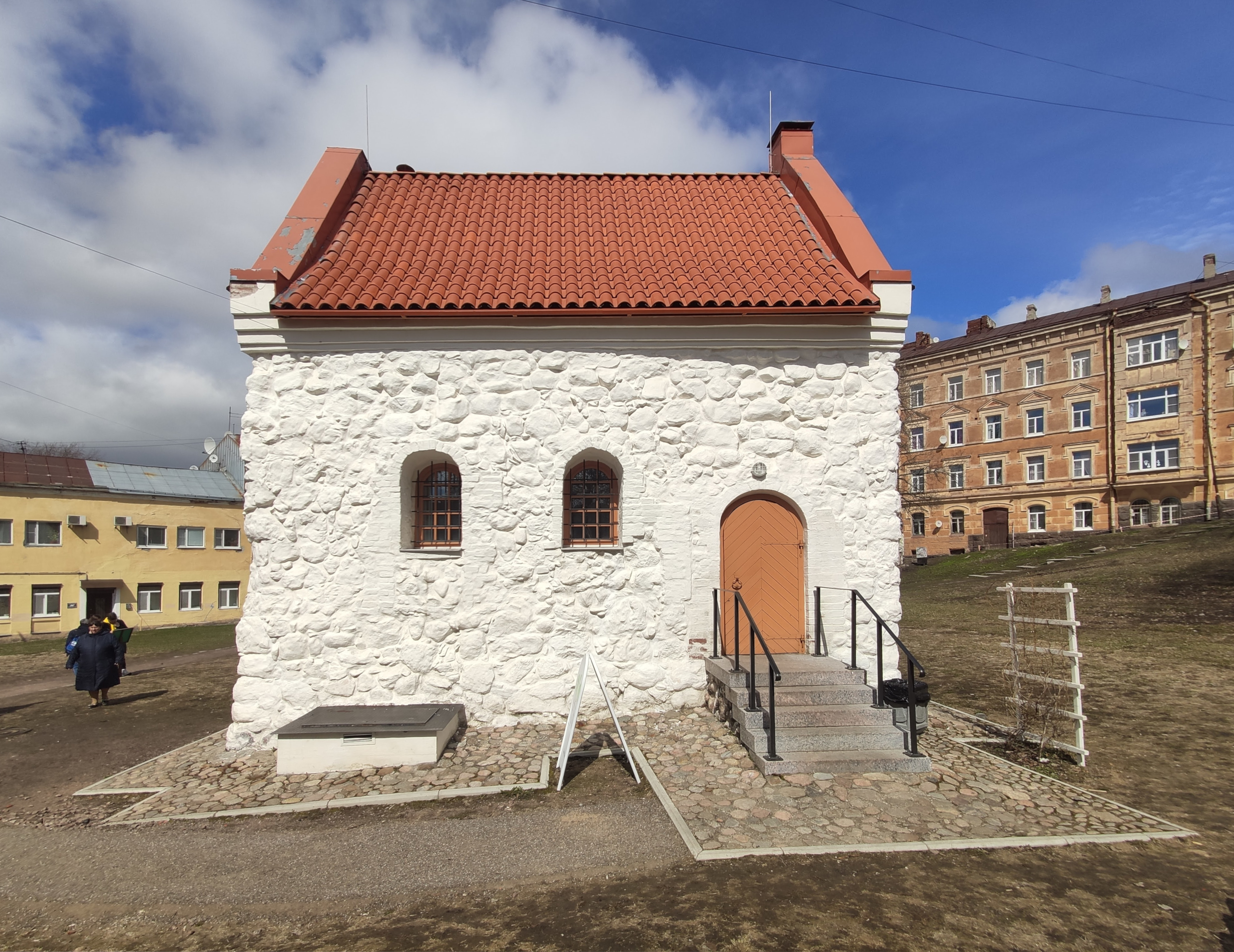
The medieval Merchant Guild House in Vyborg, Russia

Where guilds were in control, they shaped labor, production and trade; they had strong controls over instructional capital, and the modern concepts of a lifetime progression of apprentice to craftsman, and then from journeyman eventually to widely recognized master and grandmaster began to emerge. In order to become a master, a journeyman would often go on a two or three year voyage called Wanderjahre. The practice of the Wanderjahre still exists, although it is not obligatory, in Germany and France.

As production became more specialized, trade guilds were divided and subdivided, eliciting the squabbles over jurisdiction that produced the paperwork by which economic historians trace their development: The metalworking guilds of Nuremberg were divided among dozens of independent trades in the boom economy of the 13th century, and there were 101 trades in Paris by 1260. In Ghent, as in Florence, the woolen textile industry developed as a congeries of specialized guilds. The appearance of the European guilds was tied to the emergent money economy, and to urbanization. Before this time it was not possible to run a money-driven organization, as commodity money was the normal way of doing business. The guild was at the center of European handicraft organization into the 16th century.

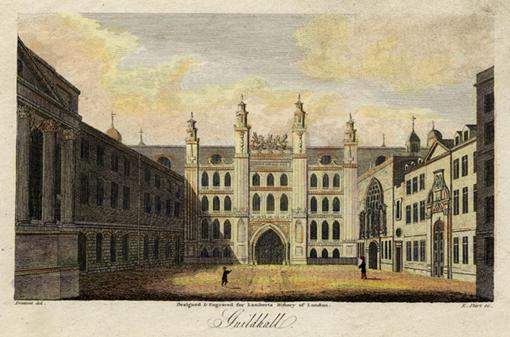
A center of urban government: the Guildhall, London (engraving, c. 1805)

The guilds were identified with organizations enjoying certain privileges (letters patent), usually issued by the king or state and overseen by local town business authorities (some kind of chamber of commerce). These were the predecessors of the modern patent and trademark system. The guilds also maintained funds in order to support infirm or elderly members, as well as widows and orphans of guild members, funeral benefits, and a 'tramping' allowance for those needing to travel to find work.

European guilds imposed long standardized periods of apprenticeship, and made it difficult for those lacking the capital to set up for themselves or without the approval of their peers to gain access to materials or knowledge, or to sell into certain markets, an area that equally dominated the guilds' concerns. These are defining characteristics of mercantilism in economics, which dominated most European thinking about political economy until the rise of classical economics.

The guild system survived the emergence of early capitalists, which began to divide guild members into "haves" and dependent "have-nots". The civil struggles that characterize the 14th-century towns and cities were struggles in part between the greater guilds and the lesser artisanal guilds, which depended on piecework. "In Florence, they were openly distinguished: the Arti maggiori and the Arti minori—already there was a popolo grasso and a popolo magro". Fiercer struggles were those between essentially conservative guilds and the merchant class, which increasingly came to control the means of production and the capital that could be ventured in expansive schemes, often under the rules of guilds of their own. German social historians trace the Zunftrevolution, the urban revolution of guildmembers against a controlling urban patriciate, sometimes reading into them, however, perceived foretastes of the class struggles of the 19th century.

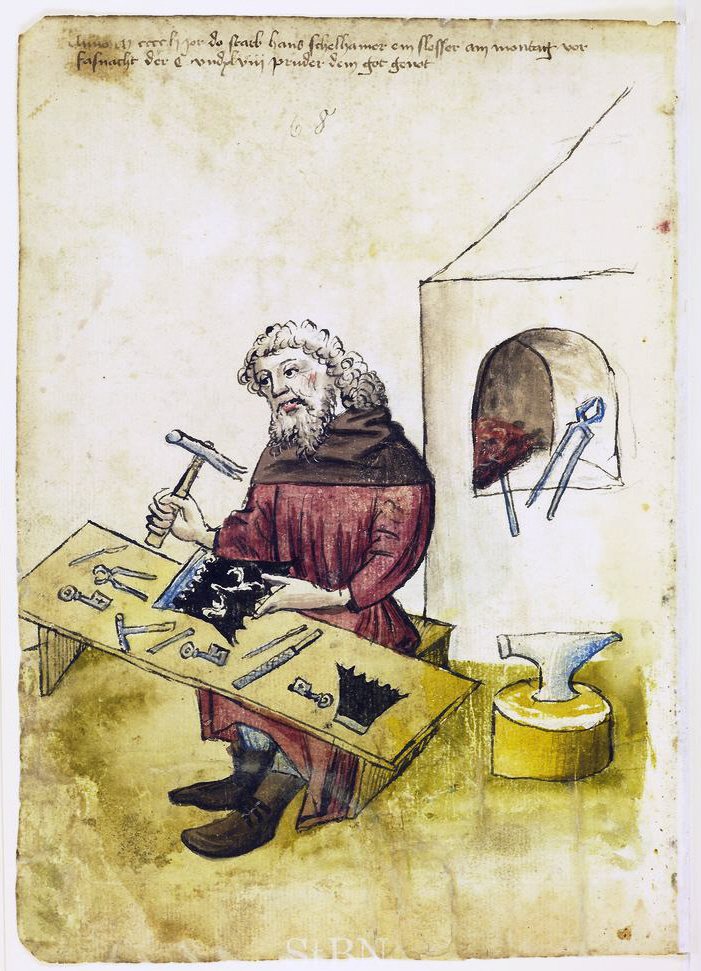
Locksmith, 1451

In the countryside, where guild rules did not operate, there was freedom for the entrepreneur with capital to organize cottage industry, a network of cottagers who spun and wove in their own premises on his account, provided with their raw materials, perhaps even their looms, by the capitalist who took a share of the profits. Such a dispersed system could not so easily be controlled where there was a vigorous local market for the raw materials: wool was easily available in sheep-rearing regions, whereas silk was not.

== Guilds by area ==
=== France ===
In France, guilds were called corps de métiers. According to Viktor Ivanovich Rutenburg, "Within the guild itself there was very little division of labour, which tended to operate rather between the guilds. Thus, according to Étienne Boileau's Book of Handicrafts, by the mid-13th century there were no less than 100 guilds in Paris, a figure which by the 14th century had risen to 350." There were different guilds of metal-workers: the farriers, knife-makers, locksmiths, chain-forgers, nail-makers, often formed separate and distinct corporations; the armourers were divided into helmet-makers, escutcheon-makers, harness-makers, harness-polishers, etc. In Catalan towns, especially at Barcelona, guilds or gremis were a basic agent in the society: a shoemakers' guild is recorded in 1208.

The Livre des métiers de Paris (Book of Trades of Paris) was compiled by Étienne Boileau, the Grand Provost of Paris under King Louis IX. It documents that 5 out of 110 Parisian guilds were female monopolies, and that only a few guilds systematically excluded women. Boileau notes that some professions were also open to women: surgeons, glass-blowers, chain-mail forgers. Entertainment guilds also had a significant number of women members. John, Duke of Berry documents payments to female musicians from Le Puy, Lyons, and Paris. In Rouen women had participated as full-fledged masters in 7 of the city's 112 guilds since the 13th century. There were still many restrictions. Medieval Parisian guilds did not offer women independent control of their work.

In France, a resurgence of the guilds in the second half of the 17th century is symptomatic of Louis XIV and Jean Baptiste Colbert's administration's concerns to impose unity, control production, and reap the benefits of transparent structure in the shape of efficient taxation.

When French seamstresses attained guild privileges in 1675, their corporate privilege extended to clothing for women and children. When they entered guilds, seamstresses in Paris, Rouen, and Aix-en-Provence acquired the right to make articles of clothing for women and children, but not for men or boys over age eight. This division reappeared in every French city where seamstresses entered guilds.

In July 1706, a group of women, members of the Parisian wigmakers, went to Versailles in order to petition Louis XIV to remove a stifling tax that had been levied on wigs that same year. The tax was removed in mid-July 1706 although historians do not believe that the guildswomen were the sole reason as to why.

Many people who participated in the French Revolution saw guilds as a last remnant of feudalism. The d'Allarde Law of March 1791 abolished guild privileges in France and the Le Chapelier Law in the same year fully suppressed guilds. In 1803 the Napoleonic Code banned any coalition of workmen whatsoever.

=== England ===
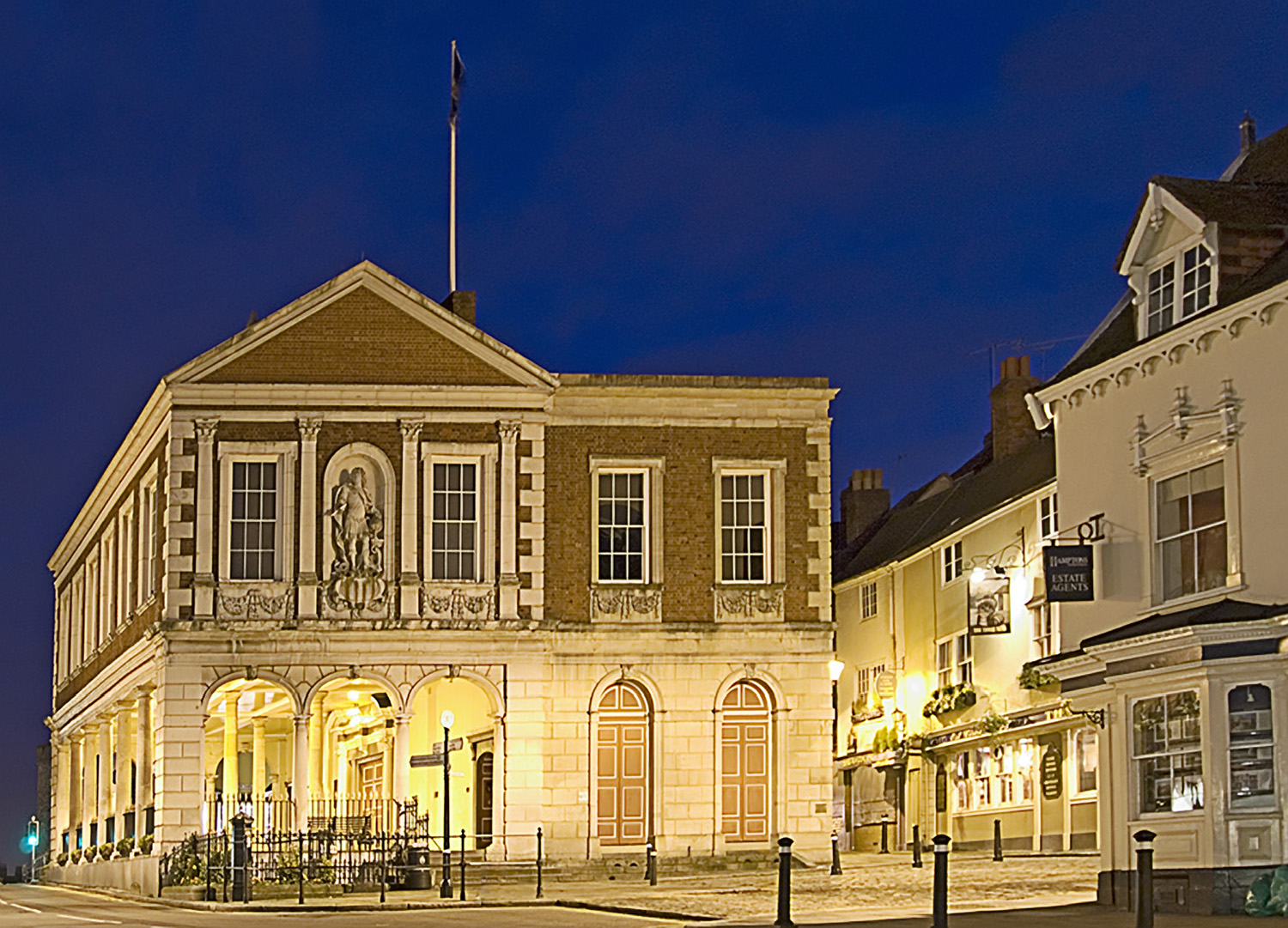
One of the legacies of the guilds: the elevated Windsor Guildhall originated as a meeting place for guilds, as well as a magistrates' seat and town hall.

The continental system of guilds and merchants arrived in England after the Norman Conquest, with incorporated Gild Merchant, societies of merchants in each town or city holding exclusive rights of doing business there, who in many cases the became the governing body of a town. Although London did not have a Gild Merchant, London's Guildhall became the seat of the Court of Common Council of the City of London Corporation, the world's oldest continuously elected local government, whose members to this day must be Freemen of the city. The Freedom of the City, effective from the Middle Ages until 1835, gave the right to trade, and was only bestowed upon members of a Guild or Livery.

As the guild system of the City of London declined during the 17th century, the Livery Companies transformed into mutual assistance fraternities. More than 110 guilds, referred to as livery companies, survive today, with the oldest 871 years old. Other groups, such as the Worshipful Company of Tax Advisers, have been formed far more recently. Membership in a livery company is expected for individuals participating in the governance of The City, as the Lord Mayor and the Remembrancer.

In a study of London silkwomen of the 15th century by Marian K. Dale, she notes that medieval women could inherit property, belong to guilds, manage estates, and run the family business if widowed.

=== Germany ===
The guild system reached a mature state in Germany c. 1300 and held on in German cities into the 19th century, with some special privileges for certain occupations remaining today. In the 15th century, Hamburg had 100 guilds, Cologne 80, and Lübeck 70.

Not all city economies were controlled by guilds; some cities were "free."

In the German city of Augsburg craft guilds are mentioned in the town charter of 1156.

In medieval Cologne there were three guilds that were composed almost entirely of women, the yarn-spinners, gold-spinners, and silk-weavers. Men could join these guilds, but were almost exclusively married to guildswomen. This was a required regulation of the yarn-spinners guild. The guildswomen of the gold-spinners guild were often wives of guildsmen of the gold-smiths. This type of unity between husband and wife was seen in women's guild participation through the medieval and early modern periods; in order to avoid unpleasant litigation or legal situations, the trades of husband and wife often were the same or complementary. Women were not restricted to solely textile guilds in medieval Cologne, and neither did they have total freedom in all textile guilds. They had limited participation in the guilds of dyers, cotton-weavers, and guilds in the leather industry. They did enjoy full rights in some wood-working guilds, the guilds of coopers and turners. Women also seemed to have extensively engaged in the fish trade, both within and outside of the guild. The butcher and cattle-trade guilds also listed women among their ranks. In practically all of these guilds, a widow was allowed to continue her husband's business. If she remarried to a man who was not a member, she usually lost that right.

In fourteenth-century north-east Germany, people of Wendish, i.e. Slavic, origin were not allowed to join some guilds. According to Wilhelm Raabe, "down into the eighteenth century no German guild accepted a Wend."

=== Switzerland ===
In Switzerland, guilds (German: Zünfte, French: corporations, Italian: corporazioni) began organizing in the 12th century, with the Basel guild charters of 1226-1271 among the oldest founding documents in the region. These associations fulfilled multiple functions beyond economic regulation: they defended trade interests, established quality standards, provided professional training, and served as religious confraternities working for members' salvation. The medieval vision of guilds emphasized guaranteeing a minimum livelihood rather than maximizing profits, leading to fixed prices and wages, production limits, and prohibitions on hoarding raw materials. However, guild development varied significantly across regions—while they were encouraged by the bishops of Basel, they were prohibited in Zurich by the 1281 charter, as the city's ruling alliance of merchants and knights sought to prevent craftsmen from achieving autonomy.

The period from the 13th to 15th centuries witnessed major guild struggles as craftsmen challenged patrician dominance in serious constitutional conflicts. In Zurich, knight Rudolf Brun allied with craftsmen to overthrow the council in 1336, establishing a new regime where seats were allocated to twelve craftsmen's guilds and the Konstaffel (guild of knights and rentiers). Similar revolts succeeded in Basel (1337), Rheinfelden (1331), Winterthur (1342), and other cities. In guild cities like Zurich, Basel, and Schaffhausen, guilds dominated all public life, while in patrician-ruled cities such as Bern, Lucerne, and Fribourg, they held only secondary political roles or none at all. Medieval Swiss guilds also extended beyond local boundaries, forming supralocal associations across the Upper and Middle Rhine regions where delegates met to discuss economic agreements, regulations, and strategies for dealing with journeymen's demands.

Guild power faced new challenges in the early modern period as economic and social changes transformed their role. The Reformation added religious antagonisms to existing tensions, with simple craftsmen—often Protestant—opposing Catholic authorities from the merchant class. Economic difficulties and declining trades in the 16th century led to increased closure, with strict criteria of legitimate birth and "honorability" excluding many from membership, including children born out of wedlock, those from "dishonorable" professions, non-citizens, and adherents of other confessions. The rise of proto-industrialization from the 16th century onward shifted manufacturing to the countryside, particularly in textiles and watchmaking, as merchant-entrepreneurs organized the Verlagssystem to exploit cheaper rural labor and escape guild regulations. The Helvetic Republic abolished guild membership requirements in 1798, though this proved temporary; guilds were reestablished in several cantons in 1803 and again after 1815, finally losing their economic power during the constitutional reforms of the 1830s, with freedom of trade enshrined in the Federal Constitution by 1874.

=== Spain ===
The latest guilds to develop in Western Europe were the gremios of Spain: e.g., Valencia (1332) or Toledo (1426).

=== Italy ===
In Florence, Italy, there were seven to twelve "greater guilds" and fourteen "lesser guilds". The most important of the greater guilds was that for judges and notaries, who handled the legal business of all the other guilds and often served as an arbitrator of disputes. Other greater guilds include the wool, silk, and the money changers' guilds. They prided themselves on a reputation for very high-quality work, which was rewarded with premium prices. The guilds fined members who deviated from standards. Other greater guilds included those of doctors, druggists, and furriers. Among the lesser guilds, were those for bakers, saddle makers, ironworkers and other artisans. They had a sizable membership, but lacked the political and social standing necessary to influence city affairs.

The Venetian community in the Renaissance was constructed on the emphasis on the relationships between neighbours, ritual brothers and kinsmen all living together in equality from the upper and lower social class. Many scholars believe that the stability, prosperity and political security was significantly due to their notion of working together and communal action. Petrarch, in the mid-fourteenth century, described Venice as "solidly built on marble but standing more solid on a foundation of civil concord." The stability of Venice was escalated through the system of the Venetian guilds. Dennis Romano wrote in his book, Patricians and Popolani: "Nowhere in Venetian society was the emphasis on community and solidarity more pronounced than in the guilds." By the mid-fourteenth century, Venice had founded more than fifty guilds that helped to achieve cooperation from both members of the government and the guild. The government was shrewd to practice fair justice equally to all social levels, which prevented riots or political protests. Depending on the artisan's trade and specialty, individuals joined the corresponding guild group upon a pledge of allegiance to the doge. There were many types of guilds such as the stonemasons, woodcarvers, glassmakers, furriers and wool industries.

== Organization ==
The guild was made up by experienced and confirmed experts in their field of handicraft. They were called master craftsmen. Before a new employee could rise to the level of mastery, he had to go through a schooling period during which he was first called an apprentice. After this period he could rise to the level of journeyman. Apprentices would typically not learn more than the most basic techniques until they were trusted by their peers to keep the guild's or company's secrets.

Like journey, the distance that could be travelled in a day, the title 'journeyman' derives from the French word for 'day' as a period of time (journée). Journeymen were able to work for other masters, unlike apprentices, and generally paid by the day. After being employed by a master for several years, and after producing a qualifying piece of work, the apprentice was granted the rank of journeyman and was given documents (letters or certificates from his master and/or the guild itself) which certified him as a journeyman. As an independently qualified worker, he could travel to other towns and countries to learn from other masters. Such wanderings could span large parts of Europe and were an unofficial way of communicating new methods and techniques, though by no means all journeymen made such travels — they were most common in Germany and Italy, and in other countries journeymen from small cities would often visit the capital.

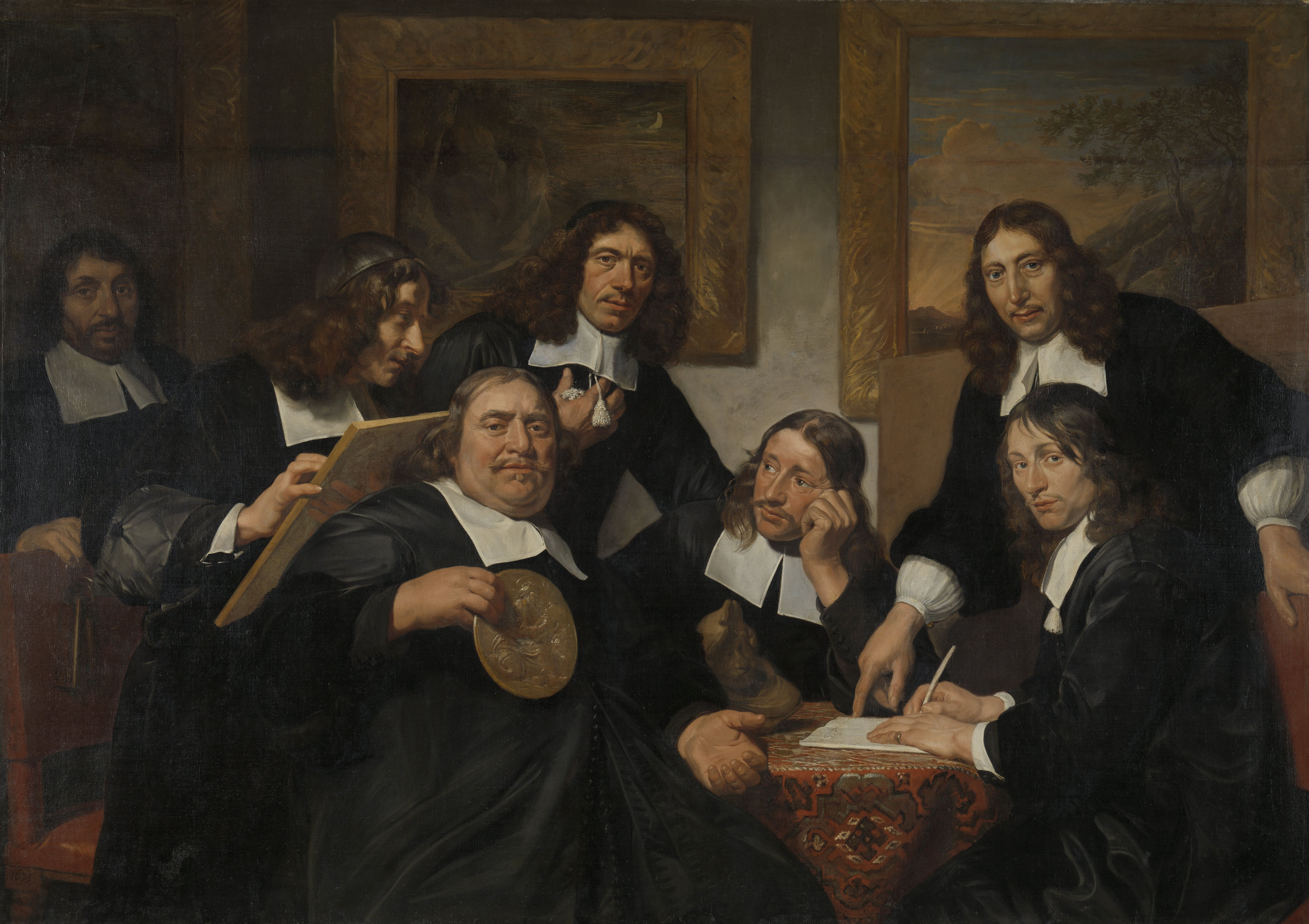
The Haarlem Painter's Guild in 1675, by Jan de Bray

After several years of experience, a journeyman could be received as master craftsman, though in some guilds this step could be made straight from apprentice. This would typically require the approval of all masters of a guild, a donation of money and other goods (often omitted for sons of existing members), and the production of a so-called "masterpiece", which would illustrate the abilities of the aspiring master craftsman; this was often retained by the guild.

The medieval guild was established by charters or letters patent or similar authority by the city or the ruler and normally held a monopoly on trade in its craft within the city in which it operated: handicraft workers were forbidden by law to run any business if they were not members of a guild, and only masters were allowed to be members of a guild. Before these privileges were legislated, these groups of handicraft workers were simply called 'handicraft associations'.

The town authorities might be represented in the guild meetings and thus had a means of controlling the handicraft activities. This was important since towns very often depended on a good reputation for export of a narrow range of products, on which not only the guild's, but the town's, reputation depended. Controls on the association of physical locations to well-known exported products, e.g. wine from the Champagne and Bordeaux regions of France, tin-glazed earthenwares from certain cities in Holland, lace from Chantilly, etc., helped to establish a town's place in global commerce — this led to modern trademarks.

In many German and Italian cities, the more powerful guilds often had considerable political influence, and sometimes attempted to control the city authorities. In the 14th century, this led to numerous bloody uprisings, during which the guilds dissolved town councils and detained patricians in an attempt to increase their influence.

In the Russian Empire merchant guilds were very important. There was already a move towards consolidation in the 16th century with the gosti integrated into the Muscovite hierarchy as heads of large corporations with obligations owed to the tsar and privileges extracted from him and with regional and local trade operating outside the capital conducted by the gostinnaya sotnya (lit. guests' hundred) and the sukonnaya sotnya (mercer's hundred) respectively. From Peter the Great at the beginning of the 18th century until the Decree on the Abolition of Estates, these divisions were formally organized into three guilds registered with the state for a fee and enjoining privileges to trade in certain areas and goods and in 1775 capital requirements for each rank.

== Fall of the guilds ==
Ogilvie (2004) argues that guilds negatively affected quality, skills, and innovation. Through what economists now call "rent-seeking" they imposed deadweight losses on the economy. Ogilvie argues they generated limited positive externalities and notes that industry began to flourish only after the guilds faded away. Guilds persisted over the centuries because they redistributed resources to politically powerful merchants. On the other hand, Ogilvie agrees, guilds created "social capital" of shared norms, common information, mutual sanctions, and collective political action. This social capital benefited guild members, even as it arguably hurt outsiders.

An example of the last of the British Guilds meeting rooms c. 1820

The guild system became a target of much criticism towards the end of the 18th century and the beginning of the 19th century. Critics argued that they hindered free trade and technological innovation, technology transfer and business development. According to several accounts of this time, guilds became increasingly involved in simple territorial struggles against each other and against free practitioners of their arts.

Two of the most outspoken critics of the guild system were Jean-Jacques Rousseau and Adam Smith, and all over Europe a tendency to oppose government control over trades in favour of laissez-faire free market systems grew rapidly and made its way into the political and legal systems. Smith wrote in The Wealth of Nations (Book I, Chapter X, paragraph 72):

It is to prevent this reduction of price, and consequently of wages and profit, by restraining that free competition which would most certainly occasion it, that all corporations, and the greater part of corporation laws, have been established. (...) and when any particular class of artificers or traders thought proper to act as a corporation without a charter, such adulterine guilds, as they were called, were not always disfranchised upon that account, but obliged to fine annually to the king for permission to exercise their usurped privileges.

Karl Marx in his Communist Manifesto also criticized the guild system for its rigid gradation of social rank and what he saw as the relation of oppressor and oppressed entailed by this system. It was the 18th and 19th centuries that saw the beginning of the low regard in which some people hold the guilds to this day. In part due to their own inability to control unruly corporate behavior, the tide of public opinion turned against the guilds.

Because of industrialization and modernization of the trade and industry, and the rise of powerful nation-states that could directly issue patent and copyright protections — often revealing the trade secrets — the guilds' power faded. After the French Revolution they gradually fell in most European nations over the course of the 19th century, as the guild system was disbanded and replaced by laws that promoted free trade. As a consequence of the decline of guilds, many former handicraft workers were forced to seek employment in the emerging manufacturing industries, using not closely guarded techniques formerly protected by guilds, but rather the standardized methods controlled by corporations.

Interest in the medieval guild system was revived during the late 19th century, among far-right circles. Fascism in Italy (among other countries) implemented corporatism, operating at the national rather than city level, to try to imitate the corporatism of the Middle Ages.

== Influence ==
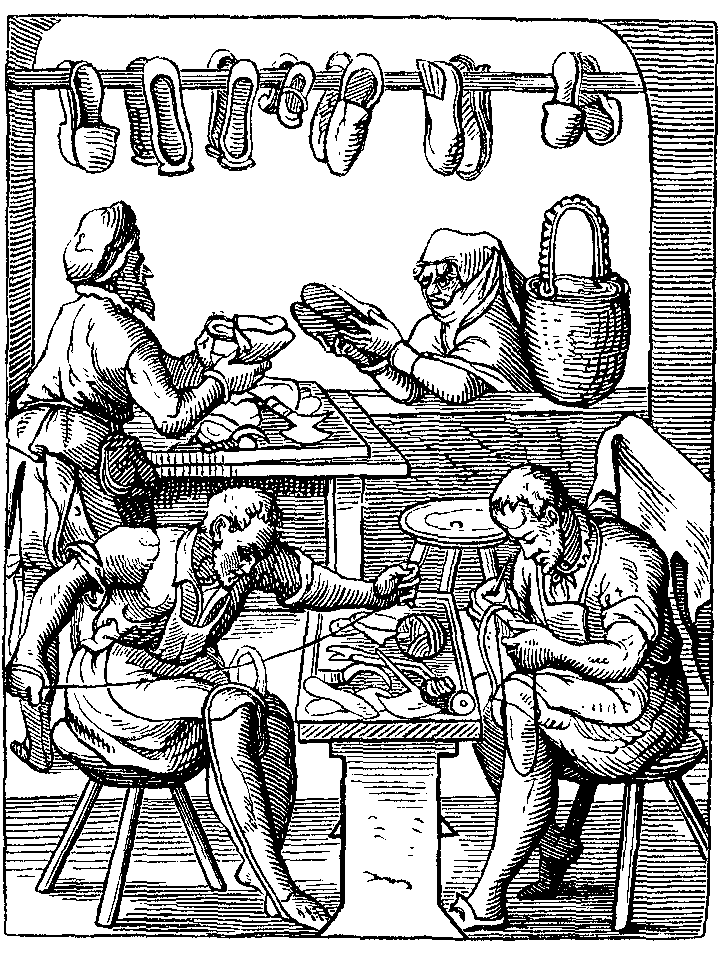
Shoemakers, 1568

Guilds are sometimes said to be the precursors of modern cartels. Guilds, however, can also be seen as a set of self-employed skilled craftsmen with ownership and control over the materials and tools they needed to produce their goods. Some argue that guilds operated more like cartels than they were like trade unions (Olson 1982). However, the journeymen organizations, which were at the time illegal, may have been influential.

The exclusive privilege of a guild to produce certain goods or provide certain services was similar in spirit and character to the original patent systems that surfaced in England in 1624. These systems played a role in ending the guilds' dominance, as trade secret methods were superseded by modern firms directly revealing their techniques, and counting on the state to enforce their legal monopoly.

Some guild traditions still remain in a few handicrafts, in Europe especially among shoemakers and barbers. These are, however, not very important economically except as reminders of the responsibilities of some trades toward the public.

Modern antitrust law could be said to derive in some ways from the original statutes by which the guilds were abolished in Europe.

== Women in guilds ==
=== Medieval period ===
Women's participation within medieval guilds was complex and varied. On one hand, guild membership allowed women to participate in the economy that provided social privilege and community. On the other hand, most trade and craft guilds were male-dominated and frequently limited women's rights if they were members, or did not allow membership at all. The most common way women obtained guild membership was through marriage. Usually only the widows and daughters of known masters were allowed in. Even if a woman entered a guild, she was excluded from guild offices. While this was the overarching practice, there were guilds and professions that did allow women's participation, and the medieval era was an ever-changing, mutable society—especially considering that it spanned hundreds of years and many different cultures. There were multiple accounts of women's participation in guilds in England and the Continent.

Women did have problems with entering healers' guilds, as opposed to their relative freedom in trade or craft guilds. Their status in healers' guilds were often challenged. The idea that medicine should only be practiced by men was supported by some religious and secular authorities at the time. It is believed that the Inquisition and witch hunts throughout the ages contributed to the lack of women in medical guilds.

The historian Alice Clark published a study in 1919 on women's participation in guilds during the medieval period. She argued that the guild system empowered women to participate in family businesses. This viewpoint, among others of Clark's, has been criticized by fellow historians, and has sparked debate in scholarly circles. Clark's analysis of the period is that things change during the early modern period, specifically the 17th century, and become more stifling for women in guilds. She also posits that domestic life drove women out of guild participation.

=== Independent female guilds ===
There were exclusively female guilds that came out of the woodwork in the 17th century, primarily Paris, Rouen, and Cologne. In 1675, Parisian seamstresses requested the guild as their trade was organized and profitable enough to support incorporation. Some of the guilds in Cologne had been made up almost entirely of women since the medieval period.

The oldest women's guild in Paris dealt in linens, including household linens, layettes for babies, and undergarments. There seemed to be a major wealth disparity among its members. The linen workers whose sheds were at the center of Les Halles caused the guild some trouble. There was a perception that these workers also trafficked in sex as well as linens, which made the guild emphatic about its own morality. On the other end of the social divide, the linen trade was a respectable occupation for married and single women of high social standing.

In Amsterdam, seamstresses acquired an independent guild in 1579. In several other cities of the Netherlands, they obtained subordinate positions in the tailors' guilds during the late 17th and 18th centuries.

=== Women's guild activity ===
Early modern Rouen was an important center of guildswomen's activity. By 1775, there were about 700 female masters, accounting for 10% of all guild masters in the city. A survey that circulated in the late 18th century listed that the Rouen ribbonmakers had 149 masters, mistresses, and widows, indicating its mixed gendered composition. A tax roll of 1775 indicated that their total membership was about 160, with 58 men, 17 widows, 55 wives, and 30 unmarried women.

Historians have noted the essential contributions that women made to these guilds. Many scholars have asserted that it would have been impossible for male merchants and craftsmen to start a business, let alone run it, without the help of their wives.

In France, special provisions had to be made in order to assure that woman could move relatively freely in the textile guilds of Paris and Rouen. They used a special legal formula, the privilege of the marchande publique. This legal device made certain that a woman had the right to participate on her own behalf in the economy, and thus did not require references to her husband's resources or possible involvement. If a woman did not join a guild first, she was required to obtain her husband's permission in order to receive the status of marchande publique. If she did join a guild, the status was conferred automatically. The privilege of marchande publique allowed a woman to participate in business as a legal adult, sign contracts, go to court, and borrow money.

Frenchwomen provided vocational training to apprentices. In apprenticeship contracts the names and trades of spouses would both appear. The trades were usually the same or closely related. In earlier research, lack of contracts led scholars to believe that women and girls never received official training, and instead learned their trade at home. This was debunked with Clare Crowston's research on parish schools in France. Instead of apprenticeships, girls could receive an alternative form of vocational training from these schools. Students entered at around eight for two years of education, and were segregated by gender. Boys studied primarily religion, reading, writing, and mathematics; girls learned many of the same topics as well, but a significant portion was devoted to learning needlework. These schools were intended to enrich the vocational training that girls learned, so that they could go on and earn a living. According to Crowston, the most important religious community that offered such training were the Filles de Saint-Agnès, which offered instruction in four trades: linen work, embroidery, lace, and tapestry-making. The school provided all of the tools necessary for girls to learn, and also allowed students to choose which best suited them. Although this was far different than the model of apprenticeship practiced by guilds, the sisters referred to their students as apprentices.

=== Decline thesis ===
Many historians have done research into the dwindling women's participation in guilds. Studies have provided a contradictory picture. Recent historical research is usually posed in rebuttal to Alice Clark's study on the economic marginalization of women in the 17th c., and has highlighted that domestic life did not organize women's economic activities. The research has documented women's extensive participation in market relations, craft production, and paid labor in the early modern period. Clare Crowston posits that women gained more control of their own work. In the 16th and 17th centuries, rather than losing control, female linen drapers and hemp merchants established independent guilds. In the late 17th century and onward, there was evidence of growing economic opportunities for women. Seamstresses in Paris and Rouen and flower sellers in Paris acquired their own guilds in 1675. In Dijon, the number of female artisans recorded in tax rolls rose substantially between the years of 1643 and 1750. In 18th c. Nantes, there was a significant growth in women's access to guilds, with no restrictions on their rights.

Historian Merry Wiesner attributed a decline in women's labor in south German cities from the 16th-18th centuries to both economic and cultural factors; as trades became more specialized, women's domestic responsibilities hindered them from entering the workforce. German guilds started to further regulate women's participation at this time, limiting the privileges of wives, widows, and daughters. It also forbade masters from hiring women. Crowston notes that the decline thesis has been reaffirmed in the German context by Wiesner and Ogilvie, but that it does not work in looking at the matter from a larger scope, as her expertise is in French history.

== Underground business ==
Due to the political, legislative, and social power of many guilds during the medieval and early modern periods, any economic activity that encroached on guild purview was considered criminal activity. The black market was used to get around regulations set by the guild for membership, for the goods they produced, and to circumvent expensive fees and taxes that may be imposed by governments. Illegal work did not pass unnoticed by authorities at the time, and are documented by police reports and guild complaints. Guild officers were able to arrest people who were working in the trade without guild credentials, and could use municipal law enforcement to aid them in the arrest. Guilds often did take people to court for illegal work. In 18th c. Lyon, about half of the defendants were men, and half were women. Daryl Hafter notes that many of the female defendants were practicing trades where they were either completely barred from guild membership, or had austere restrictions within the guild. As joining a guild was expensive, this explains why poorer men would turn to illicit craft. Clandestine artisans were seen as a severe encroachment on guild rights, liberties, and exclusivity. Many guilds feared that this would affect economic stability.

In Paris, the Barber-Wigmaker & Bath Provider Guild struggled against illicit wigmaking and styling. In this case, illicit wigmaking flourished in order to circumvent the expensive wig tax. Women and girls could enter this guild. Illicit wigmakers operated throughout the 18th century, and made continuous contributions to the industry.

Judith Coffin posits that the number of clandestine linen drapers, seamstresses, and tailors, kept pace and probably outstripped the numbers from those guilds. Clandestine workers, male and female, worked in garret shops and rooms under guild jurisdiction. Not all non-guild work was illegal, too. A non-guild artisan could work directly for the crown, or in the "free zones" that were beyond the reach of the guild officers. Clandestine workers in the needle trade were often employed by larger merchant manufacturers. Guild members were also enmeshed in illegal labor, either carrying it out, or hiring those who did illegal work. Nearly everyone was in violation of guild statutes. Masters of the guild would often hire illegal workers to do specific and low-paying parts of the job. In the case of the Wigmakers, it was hair-weaving, the most labor-intensive aspect of the craft. Hair weavers arranged pinches of hair side by side and interlaced them in intricate patterns between six silk threads extended on two wooden rods. Women called tresseuses seemed to perform a substantial amount of this work outside masters' shops.

Despite the guilds' fear of illegal craft, underground business often helped guilds survive. The creation of materials was often illicit, or outsourced from other locales. Masters hired non-guild workers to do high-intensive tasks and paid less, while at the same time denigrating their work. In many cities, guild masters purchased discounted materials and hired cheap labor to reduce costs. In Lyon, the underground silk economy thrived, and was a significant portion of the economy. It was made up of mostly female artisans whose work paralleled that of the legitimate trade. The female artisans were important to the guild as they were highly skilled in craft procedures that the guild heavily relied upon, and were essential to production. But they also worked for male entrepreneurs outside of the guild and frequently collaborated with each other to set up their own businesses. In an effort to curb this illicit activity, guildmasters wrote bylaws forbidding men and women to work outside of the guild. The buttonmakers guild of Lyon also complained about illicit work and theft from the non-guild female workers whom they hired. They also took it upon themselves to teach girls the buttonmaking trade, which was the real problem, as their instruction imparted the "mystery" of guild secrets to non-guild members which undermined the guild.

In the mid-17th c., Lübeck experienced political conflicts as guilds petitioned the councils to ban clandestine work not only in the city but in rural areas. They were outraged that members of the upperclass in Lübeck would employ rural craftsmen at the expense of the city guild. A lot of their anger spurred from the fact that they were part of the council who had sworn to uphold the guild.

Early modern Lyon continued to have a thriving underground economy into the late 18th century. In 1780, the hatters' guild complained that women and girls who sheared skins for the industry had established an underground manufacture 25 years earlier, and that it was still sustained. These women were the wives of hatters or girls who were hired day by day, and who were not content to be so dependent on the guild. The women were accused of theft of materials, buying stolen materials for cheap, and selling them for larger amounts. What was most surprising was the response from the government, which had previously always stood with guilds even at the economy's expense. A royal edict of 1777 formed a corps of these female workers, giving them legitimacy.

== Economic consequences ==
The economic consequences of guilds have led to heated debates among economic historians. On the one side, scholars say that since merchant guilds persisted over long periods they must have been efficient institutions (since inefficient institutions die out). Others say they persisted not because they benefited the entire economy but because they benefited the owners, who used political power to protect them. Ogilvie (2011) says they regulated trade for their own benefit, were monopolies, distorted markets, fixed prices, and restricted entrance into the guild. Ogilvie (2008) argues that their long apprenticeships were unnecessary to acquire skills, and their conservatism reduced the rate of innovation and made the society poorer. She says their main goal was rent seeking, that is, to shift money to the membership at the expense of the entire economy.

Epstein and Prak's book (2008) rejects Ogilvie's conclusions. Specifically, Epstein argues that guilds were cost-sharing rather than rent-seeking institutions. They located and matched masters and likely apprentices through monitored learning. Whereas the acquisition of craft skills required experience-based learning, he argues that this process necessitated many years in apprenticeship.

The extent to which guilds were able to monopolize markets is also debated.

=== Product quality ===
Guilds were often heavily concerned with product quality. The regulations they established on their own members' work, as well as targeting non-guild members for illicit practice, was to create a standard of work that the consumer could rely on. They were heavily concerned with public perception. In October 1712, the Lyon Wigmaker Guild petitioned the local police magistrates. According to this petition, guildmasters required guild officers to step up policing of statutes forbidding the use of bleached hair or wild goat and lamb hair. The real concern that they had was that bleaching hair destroyed the quality of the wig, making it too thin to style. Guild officers pointed out that if the consumer discovers the bad quality, the guild would be blamed, and the consumer would search elsewhere to purchase goods.

== Sources ==
- Braudel, Fernand (1992) [1982]. The Wheels of Commerce. Civilization & capitalism, 15th–18th century. Vol. 2. University of California Press. ISBN 978-0-520-08115-4.
- Epstein, S.R.; Prak, Maarten, eds. (2008). Guilds, Innovation and the European Economy, 1400–1800. Cambridge University Press. ISBN 978-1-139-47107-7. — essays by scholars covering German and Italian territories, the Netherlands, France, and England; plus guilds in cloth spinning, painting, glass blowing, goldsmithing, pewterware, book-selling, and clock making.
- Ogilvie, Sheilagh (2011). Institutions and European Trade: Merchant Guilds, 1000–1800. Cambridge University Press. ISBN 978-1-139-50039-5.
- Prak, Maarten Roy (2006). Craft Guilds in the Early Modern Low Countries: Work, Power and Representation. Ashgate Publishing. ISBN 978-0-7546-5339-4.
- Rouche, Michel (1992). "Private life conquers state and society". In Ariès, Philippe; Veyne, Paul; Duby, Georges (eds.). A History of Private Life: From Pagan Rome to Byzantium. Vol. 1. Harvard University Press. pp. 419–. ISBN 978-0-674-39974-7.
