= Anthony Venables =

British economist and the BP Professor of Economics

Anthony Venables CBE
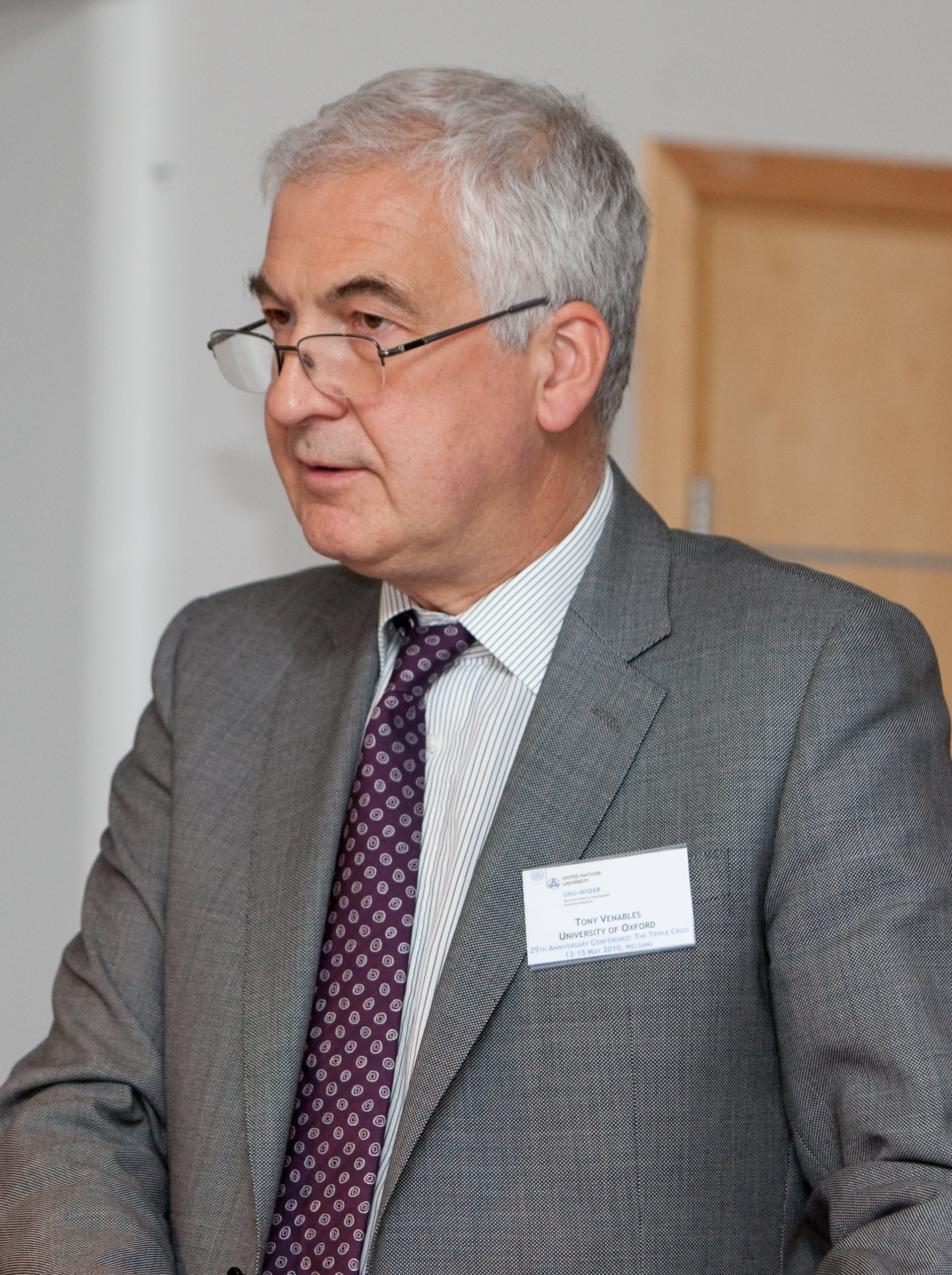
- Venables in 2010
- Born: Anthony James Venables; 25 April 1953 (age 73)

Academic background
- Education: University of Cambridge; University of Oxford

Academic work
- Discipline: International Economics, Spatial Economics
- Institutions: University of Oxford, International Growth Centre

Anthony James Venables, CBE, (born 25 April 1953), is a British economist and the BP Professor of Economics at the Department of Economics, University of Oxford.

Venables is known as one of the pioneers of New economic geography. He co-authored along with Paul Krugman and Masahisa Fujita the influential book The Spatial Economy - Cities, Regions and International Trade (2001).

He is the current director of the Oxford Centre for the Analysis of Resource Rich Economies (OxCarre). He also serves on the Steering Group of the International Growth Centre. From 2005 to 2008, he held the position of Chief Economist at the UK Department for International Development.

== Education ==
Venables studied economics at Clare College, Cambridge, where he obtained his B.A. in 1974. After completing his undergraduate degree, he then took up his studies at St. Antony's College, Oxford. He then became a lecturer at various universities before completing his D.Phil. in economics in 1984 from Worcester College, Oxford. He is a Fellow of New College, Oxford. He was made a Fellow of the Royal Economic Society in May 2025.

== Selected bibliography ==
=== Books ===
- Venables, Anthony J.; McKenzie, George (1991). The Economics of the Single European Act. London: In association with the Centre for International Economics, University of Southampton. ISBN 9780333546857.
- Venables, Anthony J.; Fujita, Masahisa (2001). The spatial economy: cities, regions and international trade. Cambridge, Massachusetts: MIT Press. ISBN 9780262561471.
- Venables, Anthony J.; Kanbur, Ravi (2005). Spatial inequality and development. Oxford New York: Oxford University Press. ISBN 9780199278633.
- Venables, Anthony J.; Collier, Paul (2011). Plundered nations?: successes and failures in natural resource extraction. Houndmills, Basingstoke, Hampshire New York: Palgrave Macmillan. ISBN 9780230290228.
