= Sheilagh Ogilvie =

Canadian historian, economist and academic

Professor Sheilagh Ogilvie FBA FAcSS
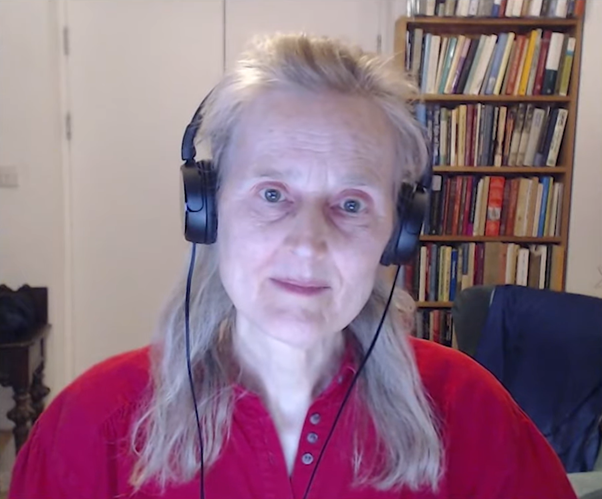
- Ogilvie in 2025
- Born: Sheilagh Catheren Ogilvie; 7 October 1958 (age 68)

Academic background
- Education: University of St Andrews; Trinity College, Cambridge; University of Chicago
- Thesis: Corporatism and regulation in rural industry: wollen weaving in Württemberg, 1590-1740 (1985)

Academic work
- Discipline: History and economics
- Sub-discipline: Economic history; human capital; demography; growth
- Institutions: Trinity College, Cambridge; Faculty of Economics, University of Cambridge; All Souls College, Oxford; Department of Economics, University of Oxford

Sheilagh Catheren Ogilvie FBA FAcSS (born 7 October 1958) is a Canadian historian, economist, and academic, specialising in economic history. Since 2020, she has been Chichele Professor of Economic History at the University of Oxford and a Fellow of All Souls College. She was previously a longtime faculty member at the University of Cambridge.

Ogilvie's research focuses on the lives of ordinary people in the past and examines how institutions and social structures affect economic life. She aims to explain how poor economies get richer and improve human well-being.

She has published influential studies on topics including guilds, serfdom, communities, the family, gender, human capital, and economic development in Europe.

Ogilvie is a Fellow of the British Academy and the Academy of Social Sciences, and has won multiple awards for her research contributions.

== Early life and education ==
Ogilvie was born on 7 October 1958 to Robert Townley Ogilvie and Sheilagh Stuart Ogilvie. She was brought up in Calgary, Alberta, Canada. She was educated at Grantown Grammar School, a state school in Grantown-on-Spey, Scotland, and at Queen Elizabeth High School in Calgary, Alberta.

She studied modern history and English at the University of St Andrews, graduating with a first class undergraduate Master of Arts (MA Hons) degree in 1979. She undertook postgraduate research in history at Trinity College, Cambridge, and completed her Doctor of Philosophy (PhD) degree in 1985. Her doctoral thesis was titled "Corporatism and regulation in rural industry: woollen weaving in Wurttemberg, 1590-1740". She later studied for a Master of Arts (MA) degree in social sciences (economics) at the University of Chicago, which she completed in 1992.

== Academic career ==
From 1984 to 1988, Ogilvie was a research fellow at Trinity College, Cambridge. In 1989, she joined the Faculty of Economics of the University of Cambridge as an assistant lecturer in economic history. She was promoted to lecturer in 1992, and made a Reader in Economic History in 1999. In 2004, she was appointed Professor of Economic History. Between 2013 and 2016, she additionally held a Wolfson/British Academy Research Professorship.

In April 2020, it was announced that she would be the next Chichele Professor of Economic History at the University of Oxford. She took up the professorship for the start of the 2020/21 academic year and was additionally elected a Fellow of All Souls College, Oxford. She is additionally an associate member of the Department of Economics, University of Oxford.

Ogilvie has held a number of visiting appointments. From 1993 to 1994, she was a visiting fellow at the Czech National Archive in Prague, and a guest dozent in the Department of Economic and Social History at the University of Vienna. From 1994 to 1995, she was a visiting fellow at the Centre for History and Economics of King's College, Cambridge. In 1998, she was a visiting fellow at the Center for Economic Studies of LMU Munich.

== Research and contributions ==
Ogilvie's scholarship focuses on how social and economic institutions have shaped economic development in Europe from the Middle Ages to modern times. She has published extensively on economic institutions such as guilds, merchant associations, communities, serfdom and markets, and on themes of human capital, gender, family structure, consumption, and state capacity. Characteristic for her work is a data-driven re-examination of accepted views in economic history, often challenging earlier interpretations.

One of Ogilvie's most significant research areas is the study of guilds and their economic effects. In a series of articles and books, she investigated craft and merchant guilds across Europe over several centuries. Her findings portray guilds primarily as exclusive organizations that acted as cartels—limiting competition, enforcing monopolies, suppressing wages, and impeding innovation to benefit their members. While guilds did provide some training and quality control, Ogilvie argues that their overall impact was economically harmful and that they persisted mainly because they benefited powerful guild members and allied elites, rather than because they delivered broad benefits to society. This perspective, developed in her book The European Guilds: An Economic Analysis (2019), has influenced the modern understanding of why "bad" institutions can endure historically.

Earlier in her career, Ogilvie's research on economic life in early modern Central Europe led to her first monograph, State Corporatism and Proto-Industry: The Württemberg Black Forest, 1580–1797 (1997). This study, stemming from her doctoral work, examined how rural industries and communal regulations affected economic performance in early modern Germany.

Her book A Bitter Living: Women, Markets, and Social Capital in Early Modern Germany (2003) focused on the intersection of economy, gender, and social structure.

More recently, Ogilvie has turned her attention to the historical impact of pandemics. Her forthcoming book Controlling Contagion: Epidemics and Institutions from the Black Death to Covid (Princeton University Press, 2025) analyzes how different institutional responses shaped the outcomes of pandemics over seven centuries.

Outside of academia, Ogilvie actively engages in the public conversation around history and economics. She was invited to give the Prais Lecture at the National Institute of Economic and Social Research in 2021, and she has appeared on BBC Radio 4's In Our Time (in a 2024 episode on the Hanseatic League). Ogilvie's insights on guilds, economic institutions, and pandemics have also been featured in popular podcasts such as NPR's Planet Money and Conversations with Tyler.

== Honours ==
In 2004, Ogilvie was elected a Fellow of the British Academy (FBA), the United Kingdom's national academy for the humanities and social sciences. In 2021, she was elected a Fellow of the Academy of Social Sciences (FACSS).

She is the winner of the Gyorgy Ranki Prize (1999, 2021), the Anton Gindeley Prize (2004), the René Kuczynski Prize (2004), and the Stanley Z. Pech Prize (2008).

Ogilvie is a member of the editorial board of The Economic History Review.

In 2023 Ogilvie was awarded a major research fellowship from the Leverhulme Trust for the project 'Serfdom and economic development, c. 1000–1861', which she will carry out from 2024 to 2027.

== Selected publications ==
- Edwards, Jeremy, and Sheilagh Ogilvie. "Contract enforcement, institutions, and social capital: the Maghribi traders reappraised1." The Economic History Review 65.2 (2012): 421–444.
- Ogilvie, Sheilagh. Institutions and European trade: Merchant guilds, 1000–1800. Cambridge University Press, 2011.
- Ogilvie, Sheilagh. "Rehabilitating the guilds: a reply." The Economic History Review 61.1 (2008): 175–182.
- Ogilvie, Sheilagh. "'Whatever is, is right'? Economic institutions in pre‐industrial Europe1." The Economic History Review 60.4 (2007): 649–684.
- Ogilvie, Sheilagh. "How does social capital affect women? Guilds and communities in early modern Germany." The American historical review 109.2 (2004): 325–359.
- Ogilvie, Sheilagh. "Guilds, efficiency, and social capital: evidence from German proto-industry." Economic history review (2004): 286–333.
- Ogilvie, Sheilagh C. A bitter living: women, markets, and social capital in early modern Germany. Oxford University Press on Demand, 2003.
- Ogilvie, Sheilagh, and Markus Cerman. European proto-industrialization: an introductory handbook. Cambridge University Press, 1996.
- Edwards, Jeremy, and Sheilagh Ogilvie. "Universal banks and German industrialization: a reappraisal." The Economic History Review 49.3 (1996): 427–446.
- Ogilvie, Sheilagh. European Guilds: An Economic Analysis. Princeton University Press, 2021.
