= Paul Klemperer =

British economist

Paul David Klemperer FBA (born 15 August 1956) is an economist and the Edgeworth Professor of Economics at the Department of Economics, Oxford University. He is a member of the Klemperer family. He works on industrial economics, competition policy, auction theory, and climate change economics and policy.

Having lived his early life in the Midlands where he attended the independent King Edward's School, Birmingham, Klemperer went on to gain an engineering degree from Cambridge University, and an MBA and an economics PhD from Stanford University. He was elected John Thomson Fellow and tutor of St Catherine's College, Oxford in 1984, and a professorial fellow of Nuffield College, Oxford in 1995, when he became Edgeworth Professor of Economics in succession to Nobel Prize winner James Mirrlees.

He was a member of the UK Competition Commission from 2001 to 2005. He was elected a fellow of the Econometric Society in 1994, a fellow of the British Academy in 1999, and a foreign honorary member of the American Academy of Arts and Sciences in 2005. He is also a foreign honorary member of the American Economic Association and a fellow of the European Economic Association.

== Academic contributions ==
His 1985 papers (with Jeremy Bulow and John Geanakoplos) developed the concept – and invented the terminology – of "strategic complements" that is now commonly used in game theory, industrial organisation and elsewhere.

His PhD thesis, and independent work by Carl Christian von Weizsacker, began the study of consumer switching costs.

His paper on supply function equilibria (with Margaret Meyer) developed a standard model for the analysis of privatised electricity markets, and has been important in developing the theory of multiunit auctions.

His papers (many of which are co-authored with Jeremy Bulow) apply ideas from auction theory to other economic contexts, including finance and political economy.

He has also invented new auction designs, including the "Product Mix Auction" that is now in regular use by the Bank of England (currently used monthly). This new auction for differentiated products has similarities to a simultaneous multiple-round auction, but runs instantaneously, is said to be more robust against collusion, and allows sellers, as well as buyers, to specify how the quantities they trade will depend on the auction prices. His other innovations include the Anglo-Dutch auction, and (with Aytek Erdil) Reference-Rule Pricing for package auctions.

He has also worked (with Elizabeth Baldwin) on applying tropical geometry to economics and auctions, including the Product Mix auction.

In addition to his PhD students, he supervised the Master's theses that were the first research of prominent economists including Professors Eric Budish, Jon Levin and Shengwu Li.

== Public policy ==
He was principal auction-theorist designing the UK '3G' mobile-phone license auction that raised £22½ billion in spring 2000 and was far more successful than several parallel exercises on the European continent. The Netherland auction that took place 3 months later raised 1/4 of the revenue per head of population, and the difference has been attributed to the auction design. It has been argued that the UK Treasury owes £15 billion or more to him and Ken Binmore, who led the auction team.

In 2002, he advised the UK government on the world's first auction for greenhouse gas emissions reductions, working with Nobel prizewinner Eric Maskin.

During the 2008 financial crisis, he advised the UK and US governments and developed a new form of auction (the Product Mix auction) to help the Bank of England alleviate the liquidity crisis. The Bank Governor, Sir Mervyn King, told the Economist that "The Bank of England's use of Klemperer auctions in our liquidity insurance operations is a marvellous application of theoretical economics to a practical problem of vital importance to financial markets." He subsequently advised other countries' Central Banks.

He advised the US Federal Trade Commission 1999–2001, was a member of the UK Competition Commission from 2001 to 2005, and remains on its Panel of Economic Advisors.

He participated in the meeting that drafted the Potsdam Memorandum to the 2007 UN Climate Change Conference in Bali; he is on the Environmental Economics Academic Panel to the UK's Department of the Environment (Defra).

== Personal life ==
Klemperer is married to economist Margaret A. Meyer, with whom he has written a number of research articles.

== Selected publications ==
=== Books ===
- Auctions: Theory and Practice, Princeton University Press, Princeton, US, 2004.
- The Economic Theory of Auctions (ed.), Edward Elgar (pub.), Cheltenham, UK, 2000.

=== Selected articles ===
- Bulow, Jeremy I.; Geanakoplos, John D.; Klemperer, Paul D. (1985). "Multimarket Oligopoly: Strategic Substitutes and Complements". Journal of Political Economy. 93 (488): 511. doi:10.1086/261312. S2CID 154872708.
- Cramton, Peter; Gibbons, Robert; Klemperer, Paul (1987). "Dissolving a Partnership Efficiently". Econometrica. 55 (615): 615–632. doi:10.2307/1913602. hdl:1721.1/63459. JSTOR 1913602.
- Klemperer, Paul (1987). "Markets with Consumer Switching Costs". Quarterly Journal of Economics. 102 (2): 375–94. doi:10.2307/1885068. JSTOR 1885068.
- Klemperer, Paul D.; Meyer, Margaret A. (1989). "Supply Function Equilibria in Oligopoly under Uncertainty". Econometrica. 57 (6): 1243–77. doi:10.2307/1913707. JSTOR 1913707.
- "Exchange Rate Pass Through when Market Share Matters". American Economic Review. 79: 637–54. 1989.
- Klemperer, Paul (1990). "How Broad should the Scope of Patent Protection Be?". RAND Journal of Economics. 21 (1): 113–30. JSTOR 2555498. (reprinted in The Economics of Intellectual Property, R. Towse and R. Holzhauer (eds.) 2002).
- Klemperer, P. (1995). "Competition when Consumers have Switching Costs". Review of Economic Studies. 62 (4): 515–39. doi:10.2307/2298075. JSTOR 2298075. S2CID 13044767.
- "Auctions vs. Negotiations". American Economic Review. 86: 180–94. 1996.
- Klemperer, Paul (1998). "Auctions with Almost Common Values" (PDF). European Economic Review. 42 (3–5): 757–69. doi:10.1016/s0014-2921(97)00123-2.
- Bulow, Jeremy; Klemperer, Paul (2002). "Prices and the Winner's Curse". RAND Journal of Economics. 33 (1): 1–21. JSTOR 2696372.
- Erdil, Aytek; Klemperer, Paul (2010). "A New Payment Rule for Core-Selecting Package Auctions". Journal of the European Economic Association. 8 (2–3): 537–547. doi:10.1111/j.1542-4774.2010.tb00524.x. S2CID 1469564.
- Klemperer, Paul (2010). "The Product-Mix Auction: a New Auction Design for Differentiated Goods". Journal of the European Economic Association. 8 (2–3): 526–536. doi:10.1111/j.1542-4774.2010.tb00523.x.
