= De Lens family =

The de Lens family is a bourgeois family of Brussels of which a branch settled in Paris in the century of Louis XIV.

== Members ==
- Jean de Lens [fr] (1616-1689), goldsmith of Philippe I, Duke of Orléans.
- Jacques de Lens [fr] (1786-1846), doctor, founding member of the Academy of Medicine.

== Heraldry ==
Coat of arms of the de Lens family (Brussels and Paris)
Escutcheon Quarterly or and sable

== Family of the same name from Hainaut ==
- Anne de Lens, wife of Adrien de Dion, had her heart embalmed and deposited in a leaden reliquary in the Church of St. Jacques of Douai in 1580, where it was discovered during archaeological excavations in 2007.

== See also ==
- Guilds of Brussels
- Bourgeois of Brussels
- Bourgeois of Paris

== Authority ==
Content in this edit is translated from the existing French Wikipedia article at fr:Famille de Lens; see its history for attribution.
