= Mark Armstrong (economist) =

British economist

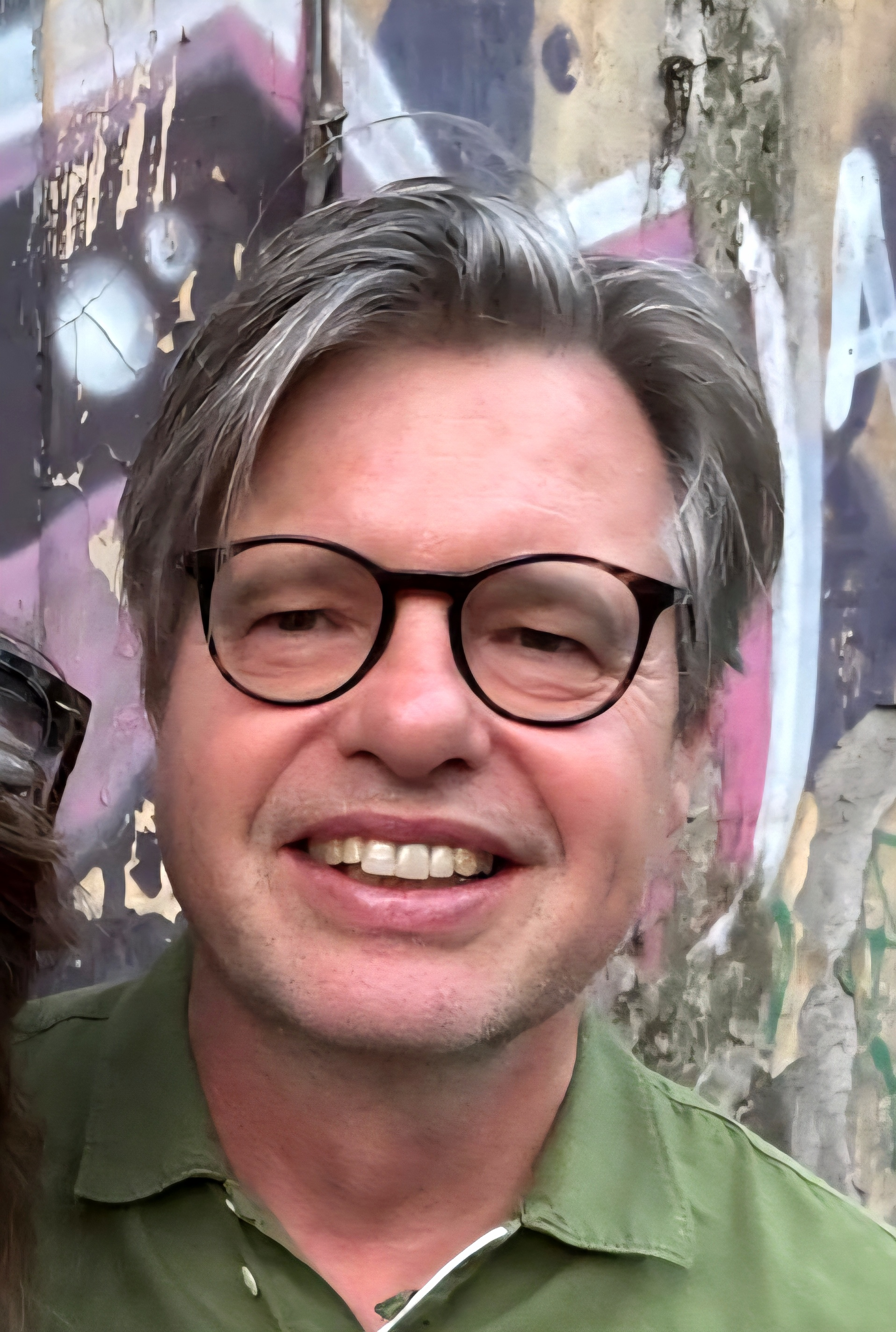
- Armstrong in 2025
- Born: Christopher Mark Armstrong
- Known for: Industrial organisation; oligopoly theory; consumer search; pricing of multi-product firms
- Awards: Fellow of the British Academy (2007); Fellow of the Econometric Society (2008); Fellow of the European Economic Association

Academic background
- Education: Queens' College, Cambridge (BA); St John's College, Oxford (M.Phil., D.Phil.)
- Doctoral advisor: James Mirrlees

Academic work
- Discipline: Economics
- Institutions: University of Cambridge; University of Oxford; University College London

Mark Armstrong (born December 1964) FBA is a British economist and professor of economics at University College London (UCL). He is known for his research in industrial organisation, focusing on oligopoly theory, consumer search and information frictions, and pricing decisions by platforms and other multi-product firms.

== Education ==
Armstrong earned a B.A. in mathematics from Queens' College, Cambridge in 1987. He then studied economics at St John's College, Oxford, where he received an M.Phil. and D.Phil. in 1992 under the supervision of James Mirrlees.

== Career ==
Armstrong's first academic position was as an assistant lecturer in microeconomics at the University of Cambridge, where he was also a fellow of Gonville and Caius College, Cambridge between 1992 and 1994. From 1994 to 1997, he held the Eric Roll Professorship of Economic Policy at the University of Southampton. In 1997, he returned to Oxford as an Official Fellow in economics at Nuffield College, Oxford.

In 2003, Armstrong was appointed professor of economics at University College London. He remained in this position until 2011, when he became Statutory Professor of Economics and a fellow of All Souls College, Oxford, a role he held until 2022. He returned to University College London in July 2022 to take up his current position as professor of economics.

== Research ==
Armstrong's research is primarily in industrial organisation, focusing on how firms and consumers behave in imperfectly competitive markets. His work has examined topics such as oligopoly theory, consumer search and information frictions, price discrimination, and pricing by multi-product firms and digital platforms.

He has made pioneering contributions to the analysis of platforms and two-sided markets, showing how platforms set prices and balance participation on both sides of a market. His research on consumer search has explored how limited information and search costs shape competition, product quality, and pricing outcomes.

With long-term collaborator John Vickers, Armstrong has studied topics including regulation, access pricing, price discrimination and bundling, consumer search, and multiproduct pricing.

== Professional service ==
Armstrong has held numerous professional and editorial positions during his career. He has served on the councils and executive committees of the European Economic Association (2010–2015), the Royal Economic Society (2010–2015), and the Econometric Society (2016–2019). He is also the President-elect of the European Association for Research in Industrial Economics (EARIE).

He served as associate editor (1995–2002) and co-editor (2005–2020) of the RAND Journal of Economics, and held editorial roles at the Review of Economic Studies, including managing editor (1999–2003) and chair (2003–2010).

== Honors ==
- Elected Fellow of the British Academy (2007)
- Elected Fellow of the Econometric Society (2008)
- Fellow of the European Economic Association

== Selected works ==
=== Books ===
- Armstrong, Mark; Cowan, Simon; Vickers, John (1994). Regulatory Reform: Economic Analysis and British Experience. ISBN 978-0262510790.
- Armstrong, Mark; Porter, Robert (2007). Handbook of Industrial Organization, Volume III. ISBN 978-0444824356.

=== Publications ===
- Armstrong, Mark (1996). "Multiproduct Nonlinear Pricing". Econometrica. 64 (1): 51–75. doi:10.2307/2171924. ISSN 0012-9682.
- Armstrong, Mark (1998). "Network Interconnection in Telecommunications". The Economic Journal. 108 (448): 545–564. doi:10.1111/1468-0297.00304.
- Armstrong, Mark (2006). "Competition in two-sided markets". The RAND Journal of Economics. 37 (3): 668–691. doi:10.1111/j.1756-2171.2006.tb00037.x.
- Armstrong, Mark; Vickers, John; Zhou, Jidong (2009). "Prominence and Consumer Search". The RAND Journal of Economics. 40 (2): 209–233. ISSN 0741-6261.
- Armstrong, Mark; Vickers, John (2018). "Multiproduct Pricing Made Simple". Journal of Political Economy. 126 (4): 1444–1471. doi:10.1086/697902.
- Armstrong, Mark; Vickers, John (2019). "Discriminating against Captive Customers". American Economic Review: Insights. 1 (3): 257–272. doi:10.1257/aeri.20180581.
- Armstrong, Mark; Vickers, John (2022). "Patterns of Competitive Interaction". Econometrica. 90 (1): 153–191. doi:10.3982/ECTA18288.
- Armstrong, Mark; Zhou, Jidong (2022). "Consumer Information and the Limits to Competition". American Economic Review. 112 (2): 534–577. doi:10.1257/aer.20201137.
- Armstrong, Mark; Vickers, John (2023). "Multiproduct Cost Passthrough: Edgeworth's Paradox Revisited". Journal of Political Economy. 131 (10): 2645–2665. doi:10.1086/724948.
