= Martin Ellison =

British economist

Ellison at the Eighth ECB Annual Research Conference in 2023

Martin Ellison is a British economist. He is Professor of economics at the University of Oxford and a Fellow of Nuffield College. He gained his PhD in economics in 2001 from the European University Institute in Florence.

Ellison has worked as a consultant for the Bank of England and as a Professor at the University of Warwick before his current affiliation at the University of Oxford. He specialises in macroeconomics; his PhD thesis was titled "Money Matters: Four Essays on Monetary Economics". His main research interest is monetary policy and he edits several journals in the field of economics.
