= Ian Crawford (economist) =

British economist

Ian Crawford is professor of economics at the University of Oxford and a fellow of Nuffield College. Crawford is a research fellow at the Institute of Fiscal Studies. Crawford's research relates to the analysis of individual behaviour, with reference to nonparametric economic theory and statistical methods.

== Education ==
- Ph.D. Economics, University College London, University of London, 1997
- M.Sc. Economics, University of Bristol, 1991
- B.A. Economics (1), Birmingham Polytechnic, 1990
