= Stefan Dercon =

British economist

Stefan Dercon CMG
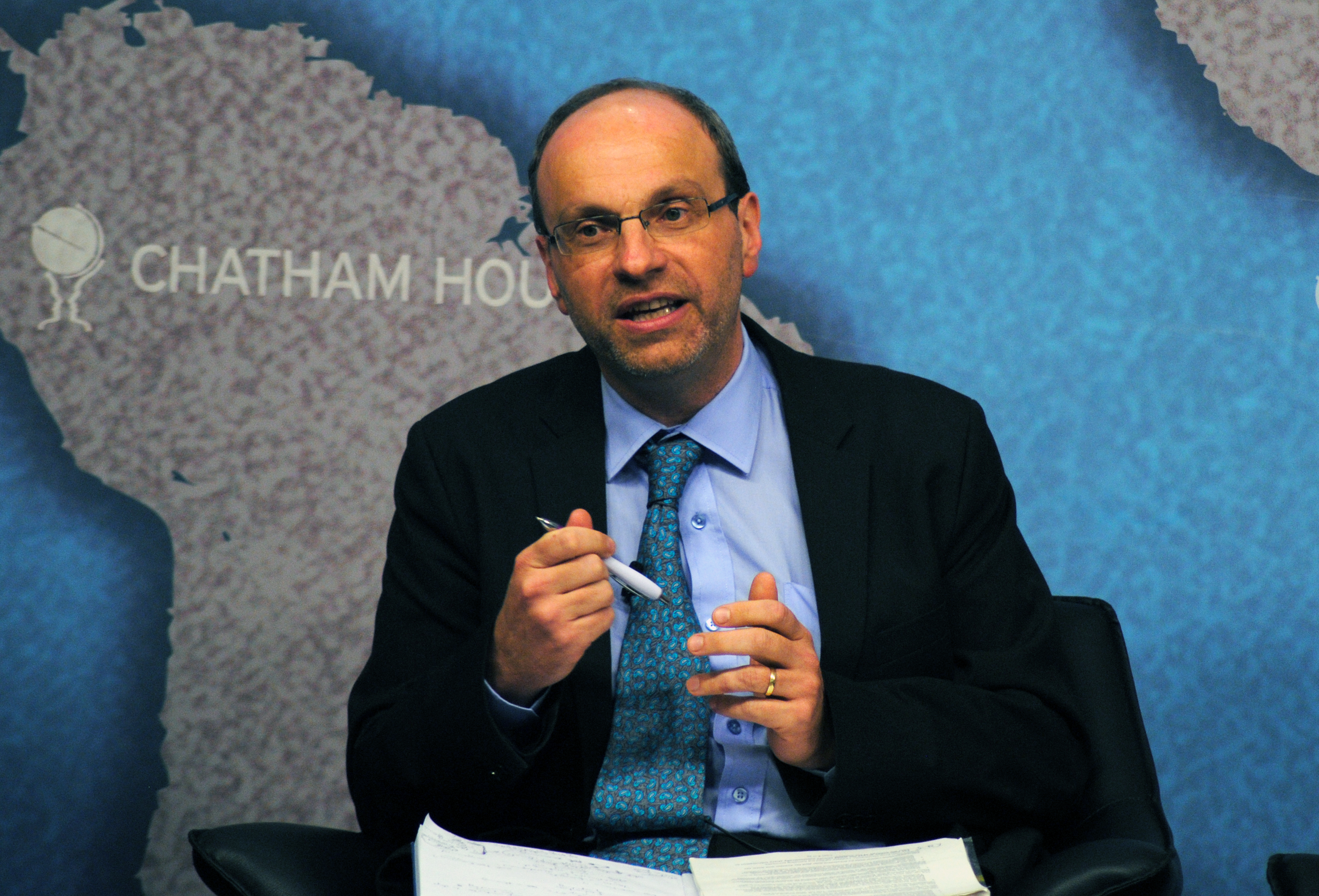
- Stefan Dercon at a Chatham House panel on 25 September 2013

Academic background
- Education: Katholieke Universiteit Leuven; University of Oxford

Academic work
- Discipline: Development economics Economic policy
- Institutions: University of Oxford
- Website: Information at IDEAS / RePEc

Stefan Nicolaas Dercon, CMG, is a Belgian-British economist and a professor of economic policy at the Blavatnik School of Government and the Department of Economics at the University of Oxford. He is also the director of the Centre for the Study of African Economies.

In 2018, the Queen awarded him as an Honorary Companion of the Order of St Michael and St George (CMG) for services to economics and international development. In 2021, because he also acquired British nationality, his honour was converted into a substantive one.

== Early life and education ==
Dercon was born in Antwerp, Belgium, and pursued his higher education in both Belgium and the United Kingdom.

Dercon studied at the Catholic University of Leuven (Belgium), where he obtained a BPhil degree in 1985 and a Licentiate in Economics in 1986. He subsequently received an MPhil in 1988 and a DPhil degree in 1992, both in Economics from the University of Oxford.

== Career ==
After completing his doctorate, Dercon embarked on an academic career focused on development economics. In the 1990s, he held faculty positions at several institutions. From 1993 to 2000 he was a tenured Professor of Development Economics at the Katholieke Universiteit Leuven (Catholic University of Leuven) in Belgium.

He also spent time as a visiting professor at Addis Ababa University in Ethiopia in the early 1990s.

Between 2000-02, he was a programme director at the World Institute of Development Economics (WIDER), United Nations University, where he led their research programme on “Insurance against Poverty”.

Dercon later returned to Oxford to continue his academic career. He became a faculty member at the University of Oxford, initially as a university lecturer and then as a professor of development economics by the mid-2000s. At Oxford, he is affiliated with Jesus College as a Professorial Fellow.

Since 2010, he has been the director of the Centre for the Study of African Economies (CSAE) at Oxford, one of the leading research centers on African economic development. In addition, Dercon holds the position of professor of economic policy at the Blavatnik School of Government and the Department of Economics at Oxford.

In addition to his academic work, Stefan Dercon has been influential as a policy advisor and public intellectual in the field of international development. Between 2011 and 2017, he served as the chief economist of the UK Department for International Development (DfID). He advised DFID ministers and top management on economic policy for development, helping shape the UK’s aid spending and programs during those years. His tenure coincided with major global development efforts, such as the formulation of the sustainable development goals, and he was instrumental in promoting effective, evidence-based aid policies. From 2020 to 2022, he was the development policy advisor to the UK foreign secretary at the Foreign, Commonwealth and Development Office (FCDO).

Before DfID, Dercon was a professor of development economics at Oxford University, and the lead academic for the Ethiopia country programme at the International Growth Centre, which is a research centre based jointly at The London School of Economics and Political Science and the University of Oxford.

He is a senior fellow of the Bureau for Research and Economic Analysis of Development (BREAD), a research fellow of Centre for Economic Policy Research (CEPR) and of IZA Institute of Labor Economics, and an affiliate of the Abdul Latif Jameel Poverty Action Lab (J-PAL).

== Research ==
Dercon’s research interests center on the question of why some people and countries remain poor and how to achieve economic development. He has examined the failures of markets, the role of government and political systems, and the impact of risk and shocks on livelihoods, especially in African countries.

His work has covered a broad range of development economics topics, including risk and poverty, agriculture and rural institutions, political economy, child poverty, social mobility, micro-insurance, and the measurement of poverty and vulnerability. He often relies on microeconomic data and uses statistical analysis to inform development policy.

Throughout his academic career, Dercon has also engaged in notable research collaborations. He has supervised and mentored many students in development economics, and worked with colleagues on major field research projects. Together with political economist Chris Blattman he ran a randomized controlled trial in Ethiopia that investigated the impact of low-skill industrial jobs on the welfare of the workers. The research was covered by Our World in Data and the Financial Times.

Dercon has also co-authored research on household risk-sharing in Ethiopia with Pramila Krishnan, and worked with other development economists on topics ranging from education outcomes to industrialization in Africa.

His book, Dull Disasters? How Planning Ahead Will Make A Difference was published in 2016, and provides a blueprint for renewed application of science, improved decision making, better preparedness, and pre-arranged finance in the face of natural disasters. The book contends that with the right financial tools (like insurance) and planning, natural hazards need not turn into major crises. It has influenced thinking on disaster risk financing and was cited by development practitioners for its practical solutions.

In 2022, he published his book Gambling on Development: Why Some Countries Win and Others Lose. A major book in which Dercon examines why certain developing countries achieve economic growth and poverty reduction while others fail. He introduces the concept of a “development bargain,” arguing that progress depends on a commitment by a country’s elite to pursue growth and development. This book draws on decades of Dercon’s research and policy experience.

== Key themes ==
His research as focused on a range of subjects including:

- risk and poverty
- agriculture and rural institutions,
- political economy,
- childhood poverty,
- social and geographic mobility,
- micro-insurance, and
- measurement issues related to poverty and vulnerability.

== Noted works ==
- (2022) Gambling on Development: Why Some Countries Win and Others Lose, Hurst Publishers.
- (2004) Insurance against Poverty, 2004, Oxford University Press (Edited volume)
- (2002) The Impact of Economic Reforms on Rural Households in Ethiopia, Washington D.C. World Bank.

== External links and sources ==
- Dercon personal webpage
- International Growth Centre website
