= Edgeworth Professor of Economics =

Professorship at the University of Oxford

The Edgeworth Professor of Economics at the University of Oxford is named in honour of Francis Ysidro Edgeworth, the Drummond Professor of Political Economy from 1891 to 1922.

== Incumbents ==
- James Mirrlees, 1969–1995
- Paul Klemperer, 1995–present
