= Étienne Boileau =

French prévôt

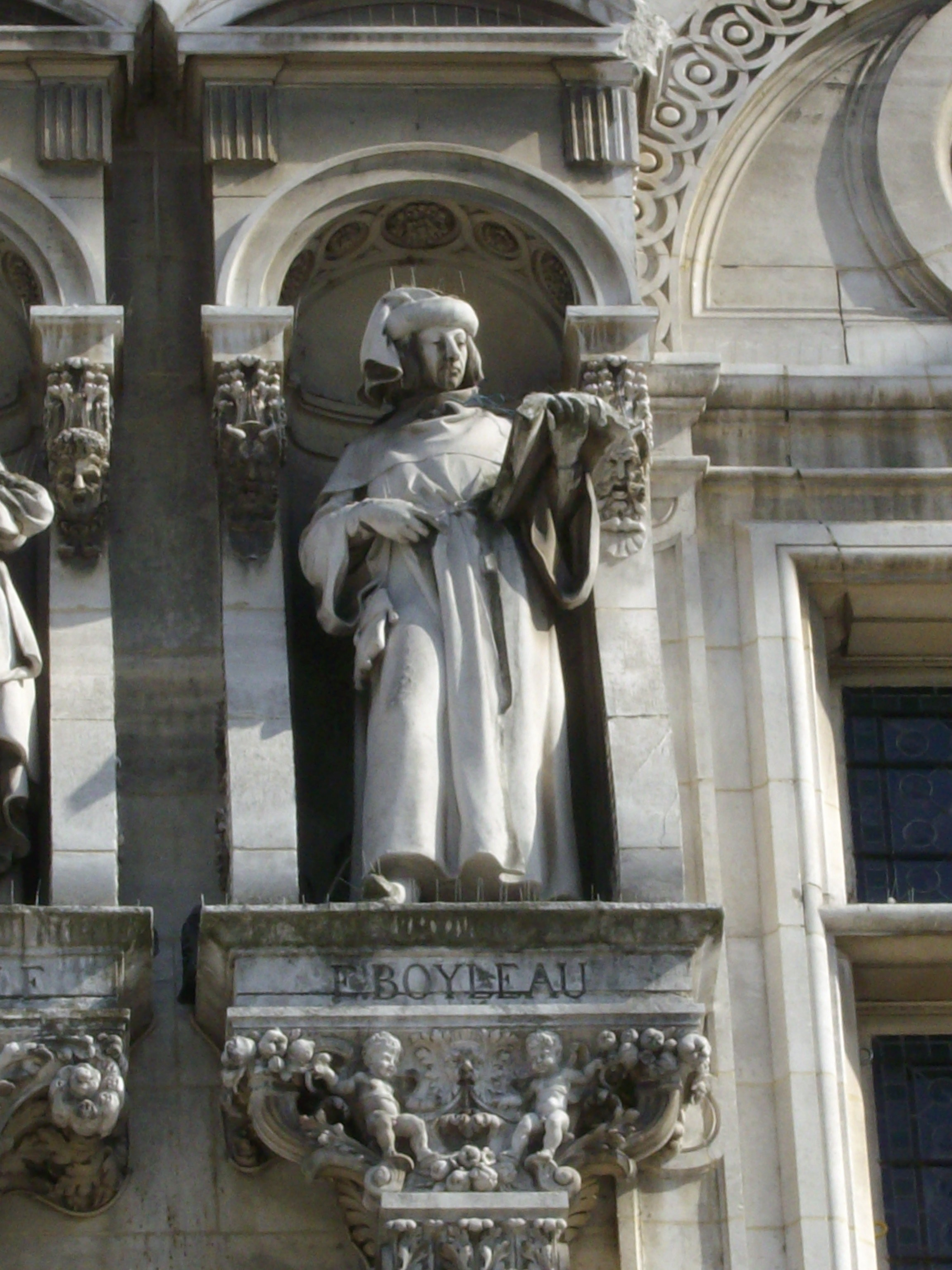

Étienne Boileau (French pronunciation: [etjɛn bwalo]) (1200 or 1210 – April 1270) was one of the first known prévôts of Paris.

== Biography ==
In 1261, he was named prévôt of Paris by King Louis IX and served until 1270. He authored the Goldsmiths' Statute of 1260, a collection of the statutes of the Parisian trade guilds, including the standards for gold and silver alloys. Boileau brought together the regulations on the police, industry and the trades of Paris in this "Book of the Trades." This work in prose is a faithful mirror reflecting the smallest details of the industrial and commercial life of Paris in the 13th century. The work is the oldest document on the legislation of the communities of craftsmen in France, written in 1268. Jean de Joinville draws a very flattering portrait of Boileau in his History of St. Louis. According to Joinville, Boileau was a just man without undue consideration for the wealth or status of the accused, and thus disencumbered the city of all its robbers and criminals.
