= UCL Department of Economics =

Department of University College London

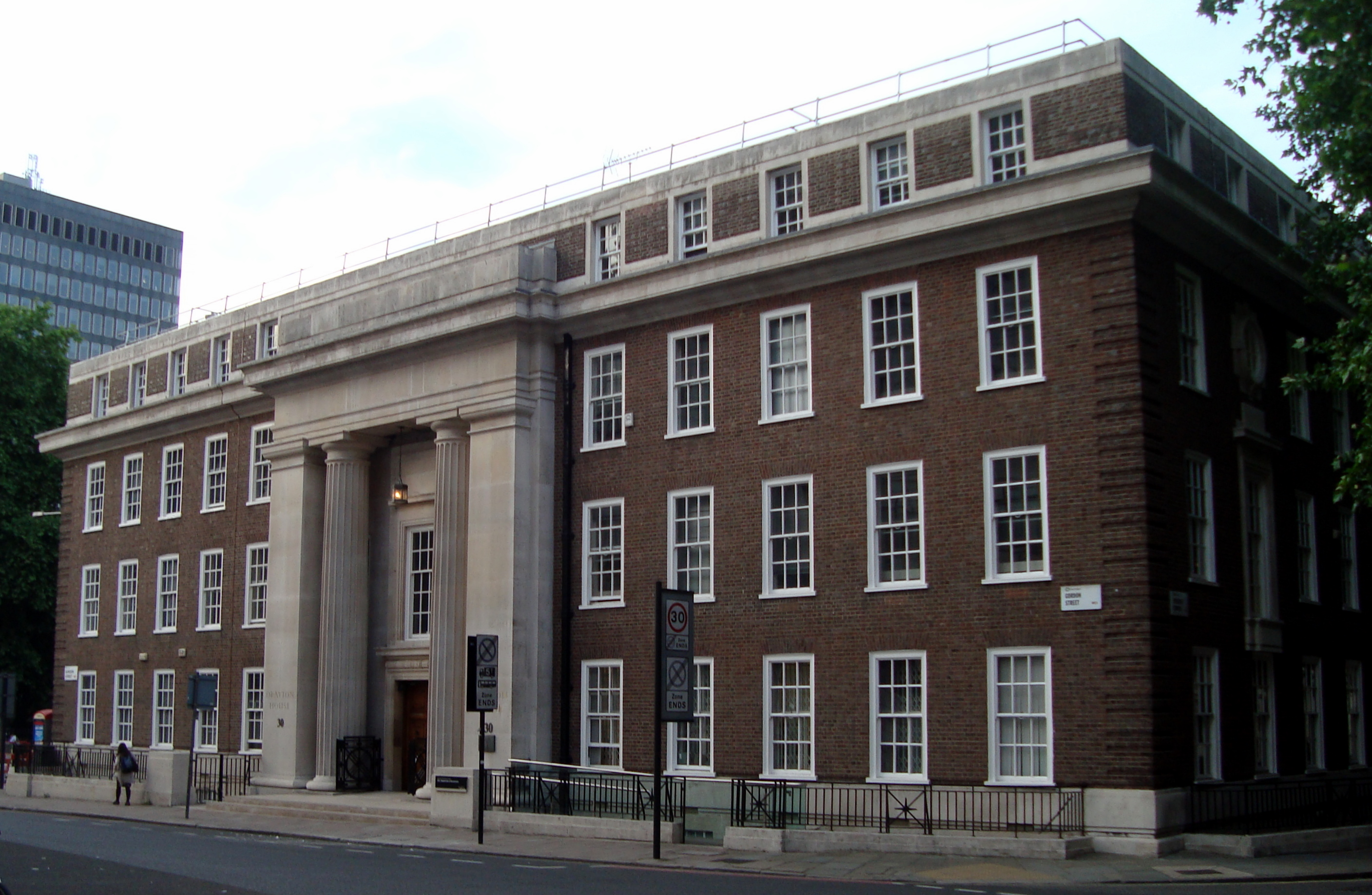
- Established: 1828; 198 years ago
- Head of Department: Fabien Postel-Vinay
- Academic staff: over 50
- Administrative staff: 18
- Students: 1,129
- Undergraduates: 906
- Postgraduates: 223
- Location: Drayton House, 30 Gordon Street, London, United Kingdom
- Website: ucl.ac.uk/economics

The UCL Department of Economics is one of nine Departments and Institutes within the Faculty of Social and Historical Sciences at University College London. It is the oldest department of economics in the world and is research-intensive, currently headed by Fabien Postel-Vinay.

== History ==
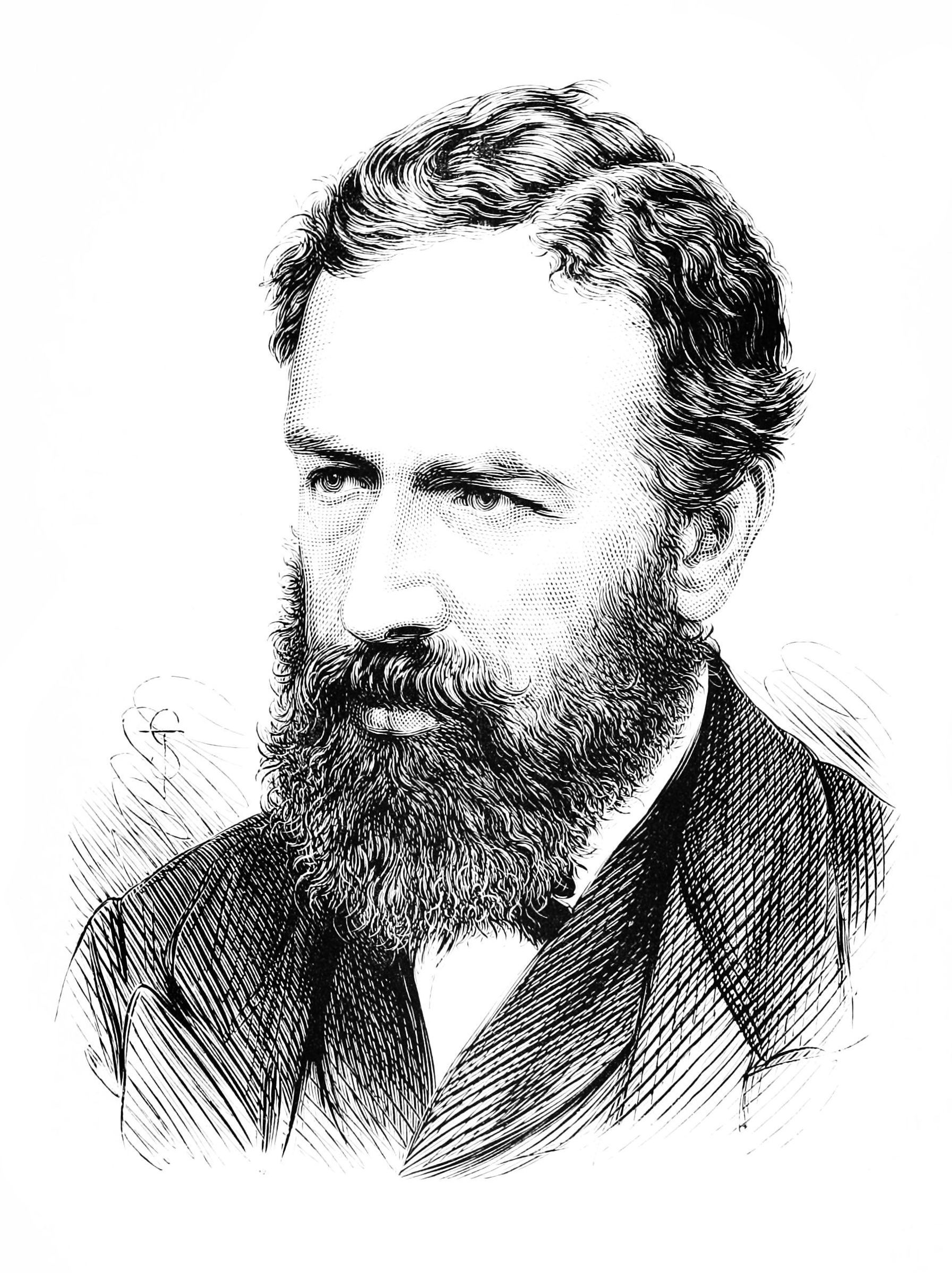
William Stanley Jevons

In 1824, Jean-Baptiste Say expressed his enthusiasm for the creation of a Chair of Political Economy in London in a letter to Jeremy Bentham, reading: “Joseph Hume tells me that you are going to establish a Chair of Political Economy in London. Bravo! Teach where the true national interests lie, and those who set personal interests against them will not have it easy". Bentham was a significant influence on the creation of UCL, often described as its ‘spiritual father’, and Hume was a member of the college’s original council.

The Chair of Political Economy at UCL was created in 1828 in memory of David Ricardo, establishing the first Department of Economics in England. The first holder of the Chair was John Ramsay McCulloch. William Stanley Jevons held a professorship of economics at UCL between 1876 and 1880.

== Research ==
In the 2014 Research Excellence Framework (REF2014), the Department received an overall grade-point average of 3.78 (out of 4) - the highest of any department in Economics and Econometrics, or any field, in the UK.

REF2014 also showed that 79% of all indicators of output were rated at the highest 4* level.

=== Research centres and publications ===
The department is currently involved with numerous research centres and publications:

- Centre for Microdata Methods and Practice (CEMMAP) — directed by Andrew Chesher
- Centre for the Microeconomic Analysis of Public Policy (CPP) — directed by Richard Blundell
- Centre for Finance — directed by Antonio Guarino
- Centre for Macroeconomics — co-directed by Morten Ravn
- Centre for Research and Analysis of Migration (CReAM) — directed by Christian Dustmann and Ian Preston
- Centre for Teaching and Learning in Economics (CTaLE) — directed by Parama Chaudhury, and cofounded by Parama Chaudhury, Cloda Jenkins, and Frank Witte
- Microeconomic Insights — Editorial board including Orazio Attanasio and Richard Blundell
- CORE (Curriculum Open access Resources in Economics) — cofounded by Wendy Carlin
- James M. and Cathleen D. Stone Centre on Wealth Concentration, Inequality and the Economy – directed by Wendy Carlin and Imran Rasul

=== Relationship with the IFS ===
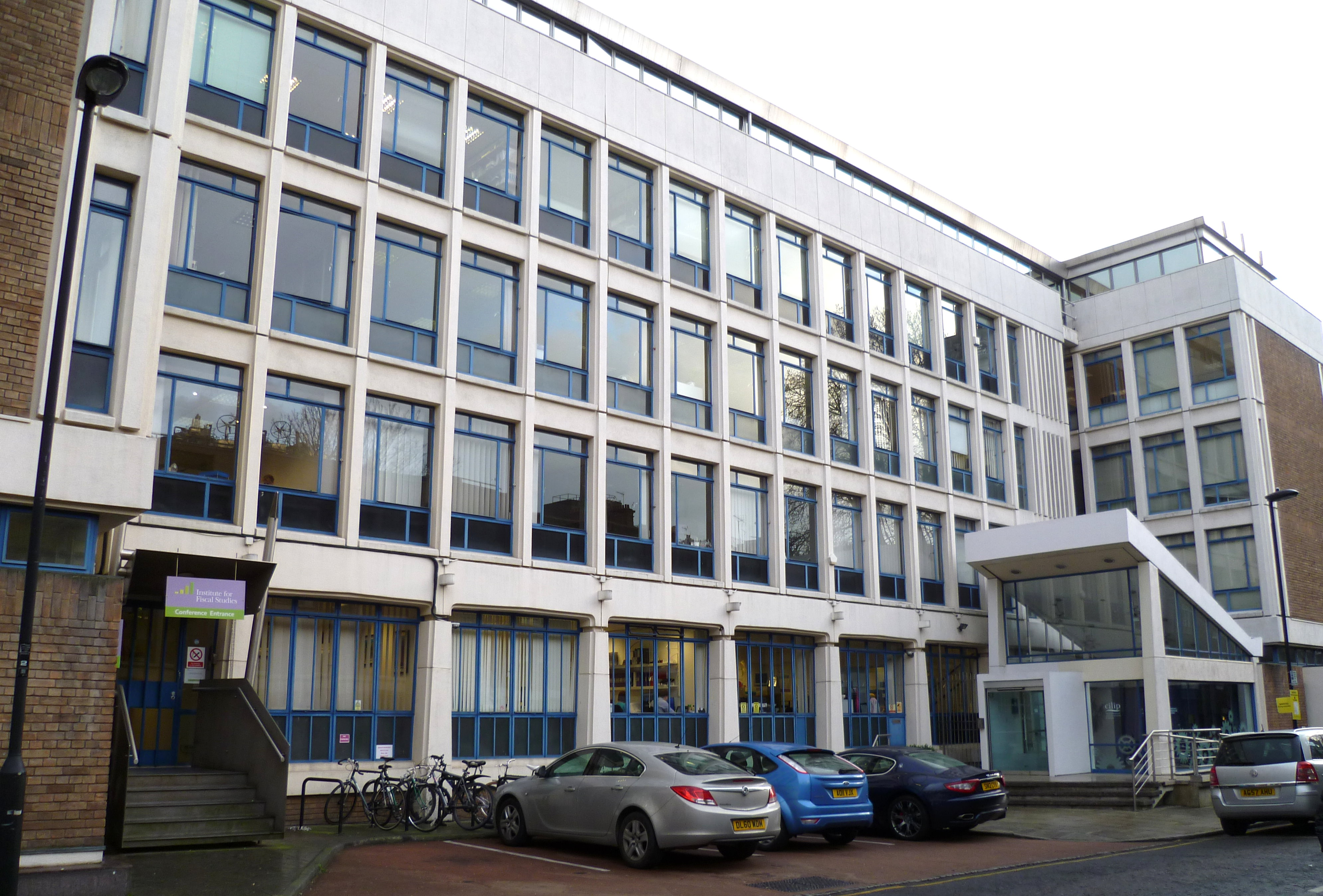
The Institute for Fiscal Studies is also located in Bloomsbury, a short walk away from UCL’s main campus

The Department has forged a close relationship with the nearby Institute of Fiscal Studies, with many Professors holding positions at both institutions, a high degree of research collaboration, and regular talks given by faculty members at each institution.

Director of the IFS, Paul Johnson, is currently serving as a visiting professor at the department.

== Rankings ==
In the 2021 Complete University Guide, the programme is ranked fourth nationally, reentering the top five where it had been consistently from 2008 to 2020.

The Tilburg University Economics Ranking is a worldwide ranking of Economics schools based on research contribution placing UCL third in Europe, and 15th globally. Similarly, the Academic Ranking of World Universities sees UCL place fourth in Europe, and 16th globally.

The 2020 Times Higher Education World University Rankings places UCL fourth in Europe for Economics, and 15th globally.

In the 2021 QS World University Rankings by subject, UCL is ranked fourth in Europe, and 16th globally for Economics & Econometrics.

== The Economist’s Society ==
The Economist’s Society is the Official Departmental Student Society, run by an elected student committee for the undergraduate population of the Economics Department. All undergraduates of the Department are automatically members. The Society puts on numerous academic and social events throughout the academic year, including a Speaker Series, the UCL Economics Conference, the inter-university Economics Debate, and the flagship social event ‘The David Ricardo Ball’.

Notably, the Society hosted Mark Carney as he gave his last public speech as Governor of the Bank of England on 5 March 2020 in the Institute of Education’s Logan Hall.

The Economic Tribune, the quarterly Official UCL Economics Magazine, is published by the Senior Editorial Team of the Society.

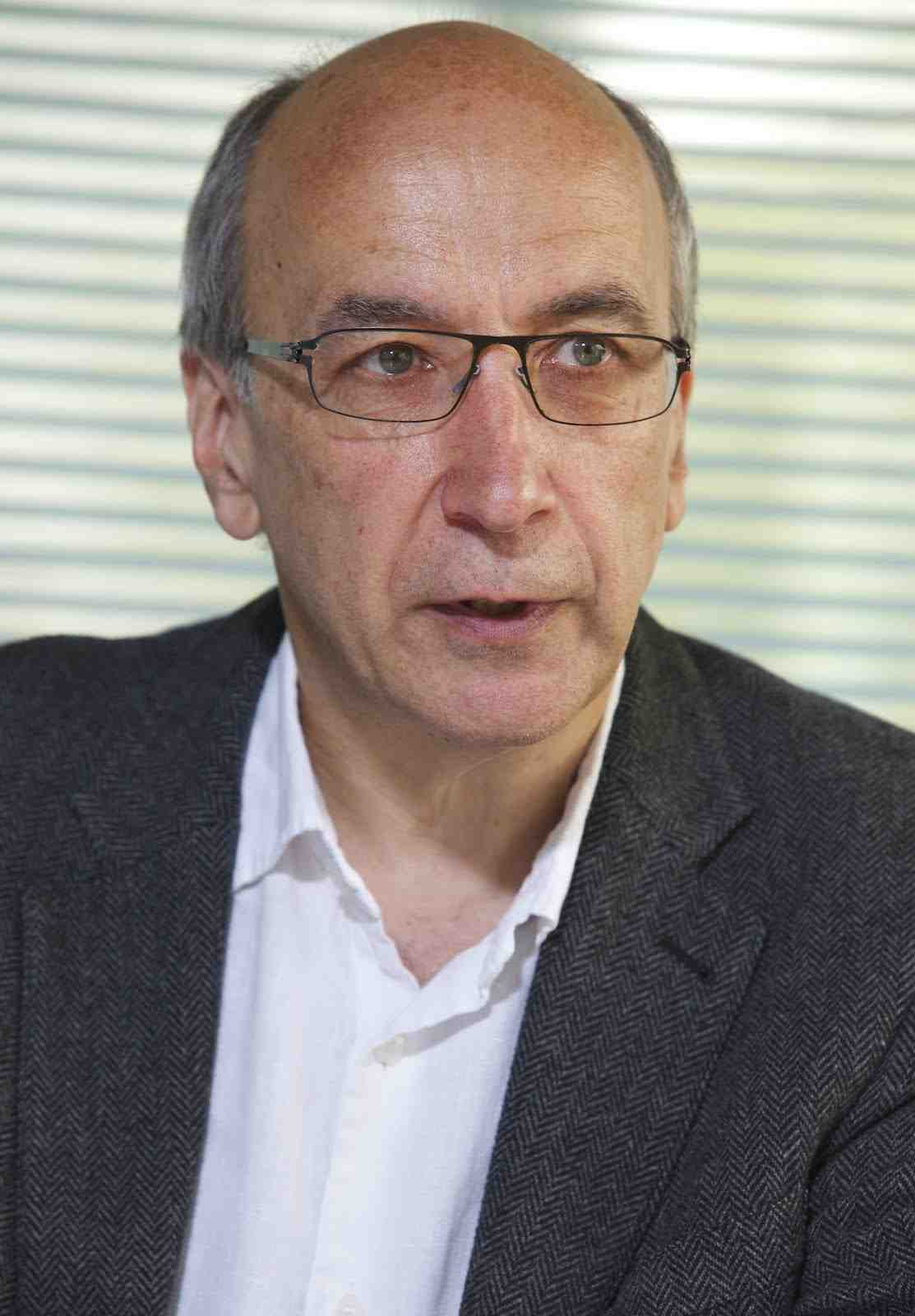
David Ricardo Professor of Political Economy, Richard Blundell, was tipped for the 2015 Nobel Prize in Economic Sciences by Reuters

== Notable current faculty ==
- Sir Richard Blundell CBE
- Wendy Carlin CBE
- Andrew Chesher
- Christian Dustmann
- Paul Johnson CBE (visiting)
- Albert Marcet
- Imran Rasul OBE

== Notable alumni and former faculty ==
- Edith Abbott
- Solomon Adler
- George Cyril Allen
- Baroness Ros Altmann CBE
- Sophia N. Antonopoulou
- Orazio Attanasio
- Kenneth Binmore CBE
- Nicholas Bloom
- Alex Chesterman OBE
- Ian Crawford
- Lorraine Dearden
- Evan Durbin
- Hugh Gaitskell CBE
- Rachel Griffith CBE
- James Heckman, Nobel Prize winner
- David Henderson
- Noel Frederick Hall
- Noreena Hertz
- William Stanley Jevons
- Junichiro Koizumi
- Sandra McNally
- Costas Meghir
- John Ramsay McCulloch
- Benjamin Moll
- David Pearce OBE
- John Pencavel
- Lord Lionel Robbins
- Paul Rosenstein-Rodan
- Barbara Sianesi
- Andrew Simpson MBE
- John van Reenen OBE
- Dame Sharon White DBE
- John Whittingdale OBE
- Philippe Aghion

== See also ==
- UCL Faculty of Social and Historical Sciences
- Institute for Fiscal Studies
- London School of Economics
