= Arindrajit Dube =

American economist

Arin Dube

Academic background
- Education: Stanford University (BA, MA); University of Chicago (PhD)

Academic work
- Discipline: Labor economics
- Institutions: University of Massachusetts Amherst
- Website: Official website

Arindrajit (Arin) Dube is Provost Professor of Economics at the University of Massachusetts Amherst, known internationally for his empirical research on the effects of minimum wage policies. He is among the foremost scholars regarding the economic impact of minimum wages. In 2019, he was asked by the UK Treasury to conduct a review of the evidence on the impact of minimum wages, which informed the decision to set the level of the National Living Wage. His work is focused on the economics of the labor market, the role of imperfect competition, institutions, norms, and behavioral factors that affect wage setting, jobs, and inequality.

== Biography ==
Dube graduated from Roosevelt High School in Seattle in 1991. He received his BA in economics (with honors) and MA in international development policy from Stanford University in 1996. He received his PhD in economics from the University of Chicago in 2003, and was a postdoctorate scholar at UC Berkeley prior to joining University of Massachusetts, Amherst. He is also a research associate at the National Bureau of Economic Research. He is the brother of economist Oeindrila Dube.

== Research ==
He has studied employment patterns in all border counties in the U.S. that were affected by state-level minimum wages on one side of state border but not the other side.

=== Selected articles ===
- Dube, Arindrajit, T. William Lester, and Michael Reich 2010. "Minimum wage effects across state borders: Estimates using contiguous counties," The Review of Economics and Statistics 92 (4), 945–964
- Allegretto, Sylvia, Arindrajit Dube, and Michael Reich 2011. "Do minimum wages really reduce teen employment? Accounting for heterogeneity and selectivity in state panel data" Industrial Relations: A Journal of Economy and Society 50 (2), 205–240
- Dube, Arindrajit, Ethan Kaplan, and Suresh Naidu 2011. "Coups, Corporations, and Classified Information." Quarterly Journal of Economics 126 (3), 1375–1409.
- García-Ponce, Omar; Dube, Oeindrila; Dube, Arindrajit 2013. "Cross-Border Spillover: U.S. Gun Laws and Violence in Mexico". American Political Science Review. 107 (3): 397–417.
- Dube, Arindrajit, T. William Lester, and Michael Reich 2016. "Minimum wage shocks, employment flows and labor market frictions," Journal of Labor Economics 34 (3), 663–704
- Cengiz, Doruk, Arindrajit Dube, Attila Lindner and Ben Zipperer 2019. “The Effect of Minimum Wages on Low Wage Jobs.” Quarterly Journal of Economics 134 (3), 1405–1454
- Dube, Arindrajit, Laura Giuliano and Jonathan Leonard 2019. “Fairness and Frictions: Impact of Unequal Raises on Quit Behavior.” American Economic Review 109 (2), 620–663.
- Dube, Arindrajit, Jeff Jacobs, Suresh Naidu, Siddharth Suri. 2020. "Monopsony in Online Labor Markets." American Economic Review: Insights 2 (1), 33-46.
- Boone, Christopher, Arindrajit Dube, Lucas Goodman, and Ethan Kaplan 2021. "Unemployment Insurance Generosity and Aggregate Employment." American Economic Journal: Economic Policy 13 (2), 58-99.
- Dube, Arindrajit and Attila Lindner 2022. "City limits: What do local-area minimum wages do?" Journal of Economic Perspectives 35 (1), 27-50.
- Bassier, Ihsaan, Arindrajit Dube, and Suresh Naidu 2022. "Monopsony in movers: The elasticity of labor supply to firm wage policies." Journal of Human Resources 57(S): s50-s86.
- Cengiz, Doruk, Arindrajit Dube, Attila Lindner, and Ben Zentler-Munro 2022. “Seeing beyond the Trees: Using Machine Learning to Estimate the Impact of Minimum Wages on Labor Market Outcomes.” Journal of Labor Economics 40(S1): S203–S247.
- Dube, Arindrajit, Alan Manning, and Suresh Naidu 2025. “Monopsony and Employer Misoptimization Explain Why Wages Bunch at Round Numbers.” American Economic Review 115(8): 2689–2721.
- Dube, Arindrajit, and Attila Lindner. “Minimum Wages in the 21st Century.” In Handbook of Labor Economics, Vol. 5, edited by Christian Dustmann and Thomas Lemieux, 261–383. Amsterdam: Elsevier, 2024.
- Dube, Arindrajit, Daniele Girardi, Òscar Jordà, and Alan M. Taylor 2025. “A Local Projections Approach to Difference-in-Differences.” Journal of Applied Econometrics (published online).

=== Books ===
- The Wage Standard: What's Wrong in the Labor Market and How to Fix It (March 2026) ISBN 978-0-593-47142-5
