= Barbara Petrongolo =

Italian economist

Barbara Petrongolo is an Italian economist, professor, researcher, and writer. She is currently a professor at Queen Mary University of London, Director of the Labour Economics Programme at the Centre for Economic Policy Research, Research Associate at the Centre for Economic Performance at the London School of Economics, and Co-editor of the Economic Journal which is world renowned for being one of the founding economic journals. Petrongolo previously worked at the London School of Economics, the Paris School of Economics and the Universidad Carlos III (Madrid). Petrongolo's economic research focuses on labour economics.

== Education and work ==
Petrongolo was born in Pisa, Italy. She began studying economics at the University of Pisa and Scuola Superiore Sant'Anna, where she acquired her Bachelor of Arts in 1993. She continued her studies in economics through the London School of Economics. Petrongolo obtained her Masters of Science (MSc) in Economics in 1994 and her Doctor of Philosophy (PhD) degree in Economics in 1998. Her doctoral thesis was titled Job matching and unemployment: Applications to the UK labour market and international comparisons.

In 1997, Petrongolo became employed as an assistant professor in economics at the Universidad Carlos III in Madrid. Petrongolo later returned to the London School of Economics in 2001 as a lecturer in economics. Between 2009-2012, Petrongolo held the Chaire Ile de France at the Paris School of Economics. She then joined Queen Mary University of London in 2010 as a professor of economics, where she currently teaches.

== Selected publications ==
=== "How Local Are Labour Markets? Evidence from a Spatial Job Search Model" (2017) ===
Barbara Petrongolo and co-author Alan Manning analyzed search strategies of the unemployed to determine if labour markets were local or not. They discuss how local labour market policies must be appropriate for the size of the market it is targeting in order to be effective. They also created their own model to address the fact that the economy cannot be separated into non-overlapping segments, as previous models have done. This allowed them to test how local shocks effect labour demand and labour mobility.

As previous literatures evaluated the economy as non-overlapping segments, it did not lead to the correct conclusion of whether labour markets were local or not. With Petrongolo and Manning's new overlapping model, they were able to characterize the job searching strategies of the unemployed. They found that job seekers are influenced by the cost of the distance to the job as well as their applications expected success rate. Their expected success rate is determined by how many other job seekers in the market are interested in the same job as them. They used the UK labour market to conduct their empirical research. The study found that distance, which is measured using commuting cost or time, discourages workers from applying for jobs. Areas with high application competition also discouraged people from applying for jobs. The study concluded that local location-based labour policies are not effective in decreasing unemployment because labour markets overlap. A more effective alternative is to provide hiring subsidies to the unemployed as it increases their chances of beating the competition.

=== "Gender Gaps and the Rise of the Service Economy" (2017) ===
Petrongolo co-authored this research paper with L. Rachel Ngai. This paper looked at the post World War II era and how the female participation in the U.S. labour market has changed. More specifically, they looked at how structural transformation and marketization has increased female work hours and wages causing an increase in the role of services as well as an increase in female workforce participation.

The study found that the increase in female labour force participation was closely related to structural transformation and marketization and that the fall in male work has partially contributed to the rise in female work. Historically, men have had a comparative advantage in good-producing sectors such as manufacturing, construction, and utilities because men are better endowed with "brawn" skills. This was accompanied with women having a comparative advantage in the services sector because it required "brain" skills, not "brawn" skills. With a structural transformation causing the services sector to broaden, women were able to get more work hours. Secondly, women generally specialized in home production. It was suggested in the paper that home production activities and market services were close substitutes. Therefore as the service market expanded, women would shift out of home production and into the services sector. Petrongolo and Ngai found that marketization attracts women into the workforce while structural transformations creates the job openings that women need. These effects are able to partially explain the decrease in the gender wage gap and the increase in female workforce participation.

=== "The Economic Consequences of Family Policies: Lessons from a Century of Legislation in High-Income Countries" (2017) ===
Petrongolo and Claudia Olivetti co-authored this paper together. The paper aimed to analyze the effects that family policies have on female workforce participation. The researchers studied the consequences that past policies have had on female workforce participation using tools such as parental leave and other forms of family aid, beginning from the end of the 19th century.

Petrongolo and Olivetti found that within the last century, labour markets have been changing in high-income nations. There has been an increase of females in the workforce which has led to a decrease in the gender wage gap. Petrongolo and Olivetti looked at events such as industrialization and demographic transitions and how they impacted women's workforce participation. Petrongolo and Olivetti found that by the beginning of the 21st century, most high-income nations have implemented some sort of parental leave and family benefit policies in hopes of increasing fertility and child development. They concluded that the most effective family policies to increase female workforce participation and decrease the gender wage gap, are policies that increase early childhood spending. Such policies focus on increasing spending of early education and childcare.
