= CORE Econ =

Economics education organisation

The Curriculum Open-Access Resources in Economics Project (CORE Econ) is an organisation that creates and distributes open-access teaching material on economics. The goal is to make teaching material and reform the economics curriculum. Its textbook is taught as an introductory course at almost 600 universities. It provides its materials online, at no cost to users. It is registered as a charity (CORE Economics Education) in England and Wales.

== Origins ==
CORE Econ was conceived in late 2012, by Professors Wendy Carlin of University College London, Samuel Bowles of the Santa Fe Institute, and Oscar Landerretche, who at that time was Director of the School of Economics and Business of the University of Chile. At the time, Professor Carlin wrote to colleagues to suggest they collaborate to revise the curriculum, noting that "altering the course of the undergraduate curriculum is like turning around a half a million ton super tanker. But I think that the time may be right for the initiative I am inviting you to join me in proposing."

After the 2008 financial crisis, students formed groups, such as the International Student Initiative for Pluralist Economics (ISIPE) and Rethinking Economics, to demand improvements to the mainstream economics curriculum. ISIPE, for example, argued that "teaching in economics departments is too narrowly focused and more effort should be made to broaden the curriculum". Professor Carlin has written that:

"The textbook model is definitely broken. In it, economic actors are amoral and self-interested, perfectly competitive market prices equate supply to demand implementing "optimal" outcomes, while environmental degradation, instability, and inequality are afterthoughts at best … Yet it continues as the backbone of much undergraduate teaching. However remote from what economists really do and the way we think, this is the "economics" imprinted on the public's mind."

Launched in October 2013 at HM Treasury, CORE Econ said its mission was to address these issues by creating a textbook incorporating contributions from many academics with different points of view that was "humbler, more empirical and more topical". Professor Carlin wrote that students "are embarrassed when they are no more able to explain the eurozone crisis or persistent unemployment than their fellow students in engineering or archaeology", and that CORE Econ would ensure that "digital technology and interactive teaching methods will introduce students to an empirical discipline. They will learn to use evidence from history, experiments and other data sources to test competing explanations and policies."

== Course material ==
CORE Econ's courses are offered through open access online ebooks published on its web site. Its ebooks use a Creative Commons license so that "any user can customize, translate, or improve it for their own use or the use of their students."

=== The Economy 2.0 ===
The Economy 2.0 is the second edition of The Economy 1.0, CORE Econ's original introductory economics textbook. A complete rewrite of The Economy 1.0, The Economy 2.0 brings together the latest research in economics and related disciplines, with the feedback CORE Econ have received over the years from committed instructors. Building on the successful features of The Economy 1.0, The Economy 2.0 introduces important innovations:

1. Inequality is embedded within the model because the interactions of the actors depend on the extent of their power and specific endowments. Sustainability and distributional concerns follow as straightforward applications of the models.
2. It comes in two volumes, a Microeconomics and a Macroeconomics volume, to help instructors delivering their introductory courses if they're only teaching either subject.
3. It comes with 5 brand-new units in the Macroeconomics volume, and an updated model of the labour market that is more realistic, relatable for students to the real world, and helps them understand important issues around minimum wage.

The Economy 2.0 is available for free online, and is published as a print book by Hackett Publishing Company.

=== The Economy 1.0 ===
The Economy 1.0 is the first and flagship publication of CORE Econ. A textbook in 22 chapters that provides a complete introduction to economics and is used in approximately 500 universities worldwide.

This economics textbook was designed as the source material for taught courses in the first year of an undergraduate degree, although it has also been used in schools, and for advanced courses in public policy.

As of 2024 this textbook is available in English, Italian, French, Spanish, Finnish, German and partially in Portuguese.

In 2017, a print version of The Economy 1.0 was published by Oxford University Press and has been self-published by CORE Econ since 2022. Since 2019 The Economy 1.0 is also available as a free app for Android, Windows and iOS, and it's also available in EPUB format, for free.

=== Economy, Society and Public Policy (ESPP) ===
In 2018, CORE Econ published Economy, Society, and Public Policy, a free ebook designed to introduce the economics to non-specialists, particularly students from outside economics courses who were taking economics as a minor. Like The Economy 1.0 and 2.0, it focuses on topics such as inequality, power, and environmental economics. ESPP is funded by the Nuffield Foundation.

As of 2024, it's available in English and Slovakian.

=== Doing Economics ===
Also in 2018, CORE published Doing Economics, a collection of empirical projects designed to teach quantitative methods in economics using real-world data, also funded by the Nuffield Foundation.

These projects link to units in The Economy 2.0, ESPP and The Economy 1.0 and help students explore important questions around real-world challenges such as inequality and climate change. All projects come with step-by-step instructions and exercise solutions and students can decide to complete them in R, Excel, Google Sheets or Python.

=== Experiencing Economics ===
Experiencing Economics is a collection of classroom games and experiments programmed in classEx. These games and experiments are linked to units in The Economy 2.0, ESPP and The Economy 1.0 and come with step-by-step instructions for instructors to run them in their classes.

=== CORE Insights ===
CORE Insights are a self-contained educational resource with a variety of CORE Econ’s standard student learning activities. They are authored by international subject experts. Current CORE Insights are:

- Public debt: threat or opportunity?, by Barry Eichengreen and Guido Panizza,
- A world of differences: an introduction to inequality, by Rajiv Sethi, Suresh Naidu and Sarah Thomas
- Too big to fail: lessons from a decade of financial sector reforms, by Claudia M. Buch, Angela Dominguez-Cardoza and Jonathan Ward
- Financing American government, by Martina Jasova and Rajiv Sethi
- Persistent racial inequality in the United States, by Trevon Logan, Suresh Naidu and Eric Bottorff. Lisa Cook contributed to this CORE Insight before her appointment to the Federal Reserve Board.

== Structure and contributors ==
CORE Economics Education is registered as a charity in England and Wales, with a board of trustees.

The day-to-day running of the project is based at University College London. The course and support materials have been created by academic economists who volunteer their time, including Yann Algan (Sciences Po, Paris), Timothy Besley (London School of Economics), Diane Coyle (University of Manchester), Cameron Hepburn (University of Oxford), Suresh Naidu, Rajiv Sethi, Margaret Stevens (University of Oxford), and Kevin O'Rourke (University of Oxford).

The steering group is Wendy Carlin (University College London), Samuel Bowles (Santa Fe Institute) and Margaret Stevens (University of Oxford).

Other prominent economists have contributed to the published material, including Nobel laureates James Heckman, Alvin Roth and Joseph Stiglitz, who recorded videos for it on inequality in education, matching markets and the 2008 financial crisis.

Since 2019, the CORE Econ online material embeds the interactive visualizations of Our World in Data throughout the material. This makes all data available for download and allows data selection for specific countries.

=== Funding ===
CORE Econ funds its projects through grants. Startup funding was provided by the Institute for New Economic Thinking. Current funders include the Ford Foundation, the James M. and Cathleen D. Stone Foundation, Partners for a New Economy, and the Finistere Charitable Foundation. Past funders include Nuffield Foundation, HM Treasury, Friends Provident Foundation, The Bank of England, and the International Economic Association.

== Differences from existing economics teaching ==
CORE Econ's authors claim that popular textbooks such as Principles of Economics by Greg Mankiw are little different in content to the first modern text book, Economics by Paul Samuelson, which was published in 1948, meaning that these textbooks have ignored many of the innovations in economics since then:

"What we teach [students] in our intro classes bears little resemblance to how we do economics ourselves. The great mid-20th century thinkers – John Maynard Keynes, Friedrich Hayek, and John Nash – initiated a process that eventually transformed how we now understand the economy, in three ways. Only one of these [Keynes] made it into today's principles course."

CORE Econ argues that concepts developed in the second half of the 20th century, such as asymmetric information, strategic social interactions and incomplete contracts should be given greater prominence in undergraduate teaching. It claims that in most universities these ideas are "mentioned, if at all, at the end of the introductory course, or as special topics."

Several authors have researched on CORE Econ's curriculum and written about its innovations and how it helps students learn economics.

=== Critical reception and press coverage ===
The Economy has been received favourably. The Economist wrote that "[e]arly results are promising":

The Economy does not dumb down economics; it uses maths readily, keeping students engaged through the topicality of the material. Quite early on, students have lessons in the weirdness in economics—from game theory to power dynamics within firms—that makes the subject fascinating and useful but are skimmed over in most introductory courses.

In The New Yorker, John Cassidy wrote that "The members of the core team deserve credit for responding to the critics of economics without pandering to them." Nick Romeo wrote that "The Economy [1.0] is designed for the post-neoliberal age".

Bethan Staton highlighted in the Financial Times how CORE Econ's "fresh approach to teaching that grounds economics in the real world" has been gathering steam in business schools too.

Noah Smith praised CORE Econ for "focusing more on hands-on data analysis."

Some curriculum reform campaigners have criticised CORE Econ for being too narrow and prescriptive, and not acknowledging competing schools of thought. Daniel Lapedus, the Rethinking Economics welcomed CORE Econ's "incorporation of a variety of thinkers in their curriculum, as well as their efforts to make economics more real and engaging for economics students ... But real critical pluralism that reflects the true diversity of real-world perspectives is still a long way off. There is plenty more rethinking yet to be done."

Yuan Yang, one of the founders of Rethinking Economics, told The Financial Times that:

"Core is not a pluralist curriculum ... It presents one paradigm, while students should be able to choose among different schools of thought."

The Times Higher Education Supplement called the course "a bold revamp" and wrote that taking CORE in year 1 had improved results in year 2 for students at University College London:

The proportion of students gaining a first in the second-year microeconomics module rose from 22 per cent in 2014-15 to 32 per cent in 2015-16, while the proportion awarded third-class honours fell from 28 per cent to 11 per cent. ... In macroeconomics, the proportion gaining firsts was unchanged, but the number who attained a 2:1 rose from 21 per cent in 2014-15 to 36 per cent in 2015-16."

== Universities adopting CORE Econ ==
In September 2026 there are approximately 600 universities worldwide using CORE Econ. These include:

- Adolfo Ibáñez University, Chile
- American University, Washington, DC, US
- American University of Afghanistan, Kabul, Afghanistan
- Azim Premji University, Bengaluru, India
- Barnard College, New York, US
- Bocconi University, Milan, Italy
- Brigham Young University, Utah, US
- Cornell University, New York, US
- Dartmouth College, New Hampshire, US
- Erasmus University College, Erasmus University Rotterdam, Netherlands
- Humboldt University of Berlin, Germany
- King's College London, UK
- Lahore University of Management Sciences, Pakistan
- Middlebury College, Vermont, US
- Sciences Po Paris, France
- Toulouse School of Economics, France
- Trinity College Dublin, Ireland
- UCLA, US
- Universidad Carlos III Madrid, Spain
- Universidad de los Andes, Bogotá, Colombia
- Universitat Pompeu Fabra, Barcelona, Spain
- Université libre de Bruxelles, Belgium
- University of Cape Town, South Africa
- University College London, UK
- University of Bristol, UK
- University of Chile, Santiago, Chile
- University of Exeter, UK
- University of Manchester, UK
- University of Pretoria, South Africa
- University of Reunion Island
- University of St Andrews, UK
- University of Stirling, UK
- University of Sydney, Australia
- University of Warwick, UK
- University of Brighton, UK
- Yale University, US
- Facultad de Ciencias Económicas y de Administración (Universidad de la República), Uruguay

== Publications ==
CORE Team, The (2017). The Economy, Economics for a Changing World. Oxford: Oxford University Press.

CORE Econ Team, The (2023). The Economy 2.0: Microeconomics. Open access e-text https://core-econ.org/the-economy/.

CORE Econ Team, The (2023). The Economy 2.0: Macroeconomics. Open access e-text https://core-econ.org/the-economy/.

CORE Team, The (2018). Economy, Society, and Public Policy. Oxford: Oxford University Press.

CORE Team, The (2018). Doing Economics. Open access e-text https://core-econ.org/doing-economics.

CORE Team, The (2020). Experiencing Economics. Open access e-text https://core-econ.org/experiencing-economics.
