= Christian Dustmann =

German economist

Academic background
- Education: European University Institute

Academic work
- Discipline: Labour economics Migration; Education economics
- Institutions: University College London
- Website: Information at IDEAS / RePEc

Christian Dustmann, FBA, is a German economist who currently serves as Professor of Economics at the Department of Economics of University College London. There, he also works as Director of the Centre for Research and Analysis of Migration (CReAM), which he helped found. Dustmann belongs to the world's foremost labour economists and migration scholars.

== Biography ==
Dustmann earned a B.Sc. in business economics from Bielefeld University in 1983, followed by a M.A. in economics from the University of Georgia (Athens, Georgia) in 1985 and a M.Sc. in business economics from Bielefeld University in 1985. Thereafter, Dustmann went on to obtain a Ph.D. in economics from the European University Institute in Florence in 1992 and finally a habilitation in economics and econometrics from Bielefeld University in 1997. After his Ph.D., Dustmann briefly worked at Bielefeld University as assistant professor of economics from 1992 to 1994 and then moved to the University College London, where he has been working ever since, being promoted from lecturer to reader in 2002 and finally to full professor in 2004. In 2004, Dustmann also founded the Centre for Research and Analysis of Migration, whose director he remains. In parallel, he has held many visiting appointments, including at Harvard, Princeton, Stanford, and Yale.

In terms of professional affiliations and memberships, Dustmann is a research associate of the Institute for Fiscal Studies, Centre for Economic Policy, research fellow of the Centre for Economic Policy Research, member of the Council of the Royal Economic Society, elected fellow of the Academia Europaea, National Academy of Sciences Leopoldina, Society of Labor Economists and British Academy. Moreover, in the past, he has served as president of the European Society for Population Economics and of the European Society for Labour Economists. Besides working as referee for numerous academic journals in economics, Dustmann performs editorial duties for the Journal of Labor Economics and has done so before for the Journal of Population Economics and the Economic Journal. In addition to his positions in academia, Dustmann has advised the British Home Office, the Institute for Labour Market and Vocational Research, and the Economic and Social Research Council.

== Research ==
Christian Dustmann's research interests include various topics within labour economics, including migration, inequality and education. Many of Dustmann's contributions to research in these areas are summarized in his edited volume on the economics of education and training (with Bernd Fitzenberger and Stephen Machin), his chapter on migration and education with Albrecht Glitz in the Handbook of the Economics of Education and in his edited volume on migration. According to IDEAS/RePEc, he ranks among the top 1% most cited economists worldwide.

=== Research on the economics of migration ===
==== The economics of temporary and return migration ====
One of the most important topics within Dustmann's research on migration concerns return migration (a.k.a. temporary migration). Using SOEP data, Dustmann finds that immigrants' duration of stay in Germany, i.e. whether or not they immigrate permanently, affects the convergence of natives' and immigrants' earnings as permanent immigrants' tend to invest more into country-specific human capital and, under certain circumstances, immigrants with higher ability are more likely to immigrate permanently. As a consequence, Dustmann argues that governments need to clarify as early as possible whether permanent immigration is possible and under which conditions. In further work (partly with Oliver Kirchkamp), Dustmann finds that return migration is affected by the relative volatility of labour markets in host and home countries and migrants' precautionary savings, by their education and the family bounds they have established prior to emigration (for Turkish Guest Workers), by the number and sex of children they have had in the host country, and by the wage differentials between Germany and their home countries. Moreover, he and Kirchkamp observe that the majority of returnees from Germany to Turkey among Turkish Guest Workers remained economically active, typically as entrepreneurs. With regard to the UK, Dustmann and Yoram Weiss explore how price differentials between the UK and migrants' home countries, migrants' preference to live in their home countries, and better opportunities to accumulate valuable human capital in the UK determine return migration. Moreover, in research with Josep Mestres, Dustmann finds that changes in return plans are related to large changes in immigrants' remittances to their home countries. Finally, along with Itzhak Fadlon, Weiss and Dustmann use a Roy model to explore the effect of return migration and skill-specific human capital accumulation on the brain drain in migrants' home countries, which may instead experience a "brain gain" if enough emigrants return after having strongly improved their skills abroad.

==== The effect of immigrants' host country language skills ====
A second major area of research in Dustmann's work on migration relates to the effect of immigrants' host country language proficiency. Among else, he finds that fluency in German among immigrants increases in education, is lower for the elderly and women, and is only improved by labour market participation in the case of speaking. He also finds that immigrants' fluency in both speaking and especially writing German is associated with higher earnings. In another study, Dustmann observes that immigrants' acquisition of speaking and writing fluency is mostly driven by their parents' education level, whereas living in areas with high concentrations of immigrants has only a moderately negative effect. Furthermore, migrants' investments into language proficiency are shown to depend on whether migrants' intend to immigrate permanently or temporarily. In work with Arthur van Soest, Dustmann finds that the effect of language proficiency on immigrants' earnings was likely underestimated by earlier studies as the downward bias due to measurement errors in subjective language proficiency dominates the upward bias due to heterogeneity in terms of unobserved ability. Finally, together with Francesca Fabbri, Dustmann documents that language acquisition and labour market performance vary widely across non-white immigrants in the UK based on their ethnic origins and that English proficiency significantly increases immigrants' likelihood of employment and earnings.

==== Natives' attitudes towards immigration ====
Together with Ian Preston, Dustmann has analysed the attitudes of ethnic majorities towards ethnic minorities. Among else, they find that earlier research in the UK likely overestimated the positive impact of local immigration on natives' attitudes towards immigrants because they omitted the tendency of xenophobic natives to move to locations with few migrants; instead, they find that, if anything, high concentrations of ethnic minorities likely exacerbated xenophobia in England. With David Card, they also find that xenophobic attitudes among European natives are mainly driven by concerns over how changes in the composition of the local population due to immigration may affect amenities from neighbourhoods, schools and workplaces, instead of concerns over wages and taxes, thus explaining why individuals with lower education tend to display more xenophobic attitudes, as they benefit relatively more from these public amenities than highly educated people. This dominance of welfare concerns over labour market concerns is also supported by earlier work on the UK, though racial and cultural prejudice also plays an important role there, if immigrants have a different ethnicity.

==== The effects of immigration on host countries and immigrants ====
A fourth area in Dustmann's research on migration studies the impact of immigration on domestic labour markets. Therein, together with Fabbri and Preston, Dustmann finds that while immigration in Britain overall doesn't appear to have an effect on British natives' employment, labour force participation, unemployment, and wages, immigration in fact likely decreased the employment of medium-skilled natives and increased that of high-skilled natives. In further work with Albrecht Glitz and Tommaso Frattini, Dustmann studies how European countries' labour markets adjusted to recent immigration through changes in factor prices, output mix and production technology. This research is further complemented by work with Glitz, Yann Algan and Alan Manning that compares the performance of first- and second-generation immigrants in France, Germany and the UK in terms of education, earnings and employment, as well as by research with Frattini and Gianandrea Lanzara which shows that even though second-generation immigrants tend to perform worse than natives in terms of education, immigration has a strongly positive on their education relative to that of their peers in their home country. More recently, Dustmann, Frattini and Caroline Halls have also analyzed the fiscal effects of immigration in the UK, finding that European immigrants in general and especially immigrants from post-2004 EU Member States have made consistently positive contributions to the UK's public finances between 1995 and 2011, though the opposite holds true for non-EEA immigrants, in particular before 2000. Finally, together with Frattini and Preston, Dustmann finds that immigrants' move to the UK generally results in a considerable downgrade of their position within the wage distribution, which then in turns depresses slightly wages among the bottom fifth of native workers but increases wages for the upper half.

=== Other research in labour economics ===
In parallel to his research on the economics of migration, Dustmann has also performed influential research on various other topics in labour economics, including wages, job benefits, education, and structural change:

- Produced a 2003 paper for the Home Office which predicted "net immigration from the AC-10 to the UK after the current enlargement of the EU will be relatively small, at between 5,000 and 13,000 immigrants per year up to 2010".
- Addressing the issue of endogeneity in education, experience and hours worked, Dustmann and van Soest find consistently positive private-public wage differentials in Germany;
- Dustmann and Uta Schönberg find no evidence that expanding maternity leave coverage in Germany improved children's educational outcomes, though it strongly decreased mothers' probability to return to work;
- Dustmann, Glitz and Schönberg explore how referral-based job networks lead to German firms' tendency to workers from certain ethnic groups the higher the share of the firm's workers that are already from that group, with such referral-based hires typically earning higher workers and being less likely to quit;
- Dustmann, van Soest and Najma Rajah find that reducing class size in England and Wales increases individuals' future wages by strongly increasing students' likelihood of staying in school after the end of compulsory schooling;
- Dustmann, Schönberg and Johannes Ludsteck argue skill-biased technological change increased inequality at the top of the German wage distribution in the 1980s and 1990s, whereas they attribute the growth of inequality at the bottom of the wage distribution to a combination of de-unionization and the increase in the relative supply of low-skilled workers following German reunification;
- Dustmann and Costas Meghir find that while the earnings of skilled workers in Germany benefit from experience and firm tenure, those of unskilled workers benefit only from firm tenure but hardly from experience and not at all from sector tenure;
- Dustmann, Schönberg, Bernd Fitzenberger and Alexandra Spitz-Oener argue that the main reason for the resurgence of Germany's economy since the mid-2000s has been the flexibility of its labour market institutions such as work councils and short-term work.

== Recognition ==
Dustmann is a Fellow of the British Academy. In 2021 he was named a Fellow of the Econometric Society.
