= UCL Faculty of Social and Historical Sciences =

Coordinates: 51.52414°N 0.13284°W

- Dean: Professor Nick Witham
- Academic staff: 777 (as of December 2018)
- Administrative staff: 291 (as of December 2018)
- Students: 5,951
- Undergraduates: 3,527
- Postgraduates: 2,424
- Location: Andrew Huxley Building, London, United Kingdom
- Website: ucl.ac.uk/shs

The UCL Faculty of Social and Historical Sciences is one of the 11 constituent faculties of University College London (UCL). The current Executive Dean of the Faculty is Professor Nick Witham, having been appointed from September 2024.

== History ==
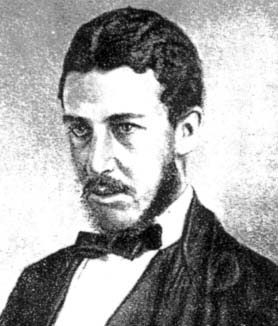
William Stanley Jevons

=== 19th century ===
The Chair of Political Economy at UCL was created in 1827 in memory of David Ricardo, establishing the first Department of Economics in England. The first holder of the chair was John Ramsay McCulloch. In 1833 Alexander Maconochie was appointed as professor of geography at UCL, the first such appointment in the British Isles. In 1853 Gottfried Kinkel gave a series of lectures on medieval art at UCL. William Stanley Jevons held a professorship of Economics at UCL between 1876 and 1880.

=== 20th century ===
In 1922 Tancred Borenius became the first holder of the UCL Chair in History of Art, a post he held until his death in 1948. He was succeeded by Rudolf Wittkower from 1948 to 1956 and Ernst Gombrich from 1956 to 1959. Ronald Fisher was Professor of Eugenics at UCL between 1933 and 1939. Ian Christie was a reader of History from 1960 to 1966, Professor of History from 1966 to 1979, Chairman of the History Department from 1975 to 1979 and Astor Professor of British History from 1979 to 1984. Between 1962 and 1972 Peter Ucko was lecturer in anthropology at UCL. Sir Robert Rees Davies was a lecturer in the Department of History between 1963 and 1976. UCL merged with the Institute of Archaeology in 1986. The Constitution Unit was established in April 1995. The School of Slavonic and East European Studies merged with UCL in 1999.

=== 21st century ===
In May 2003, a team from the Department of Anthropology published a major piece of research on the possible link between the amount of food that a mother has to eat and the gender of her children. In May 2006 a report co-authored by James Banks of the Department of Economics was published which concluded that rates of diseases such as diabetes, lung cancer and high-blood pressure were up to twice as high among Americans aged between 55 and 64 as among English people of the same age group. Between 1997 and 2007 Lindsey Hughes was a Professor of Russian History at the School of Slavonic and East European Studies. In May 2009 a major report on the health risks posed by global warming co-authored by Mark Maslin, the Director of the Environment Institute, was published. In January 2010 Simon Corcoran and Benet Salway of the History Department discovered fragments of the Gregorian Codex, an important Roman law code that previously had been thought lost forever.

== Departments ==
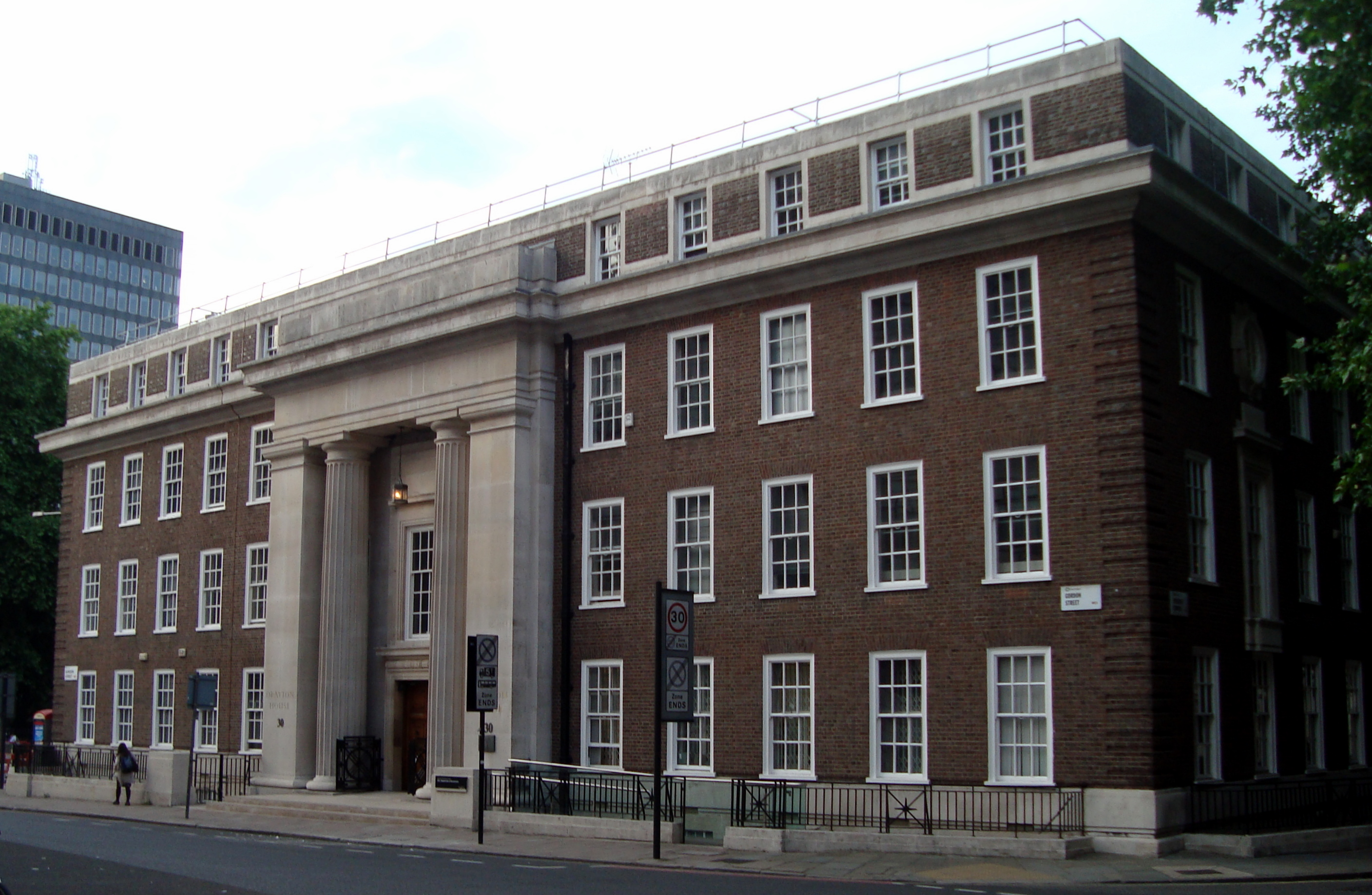
UCL Department of Economics, Drayton House

The Faculty currently comprises the following nine Departments and Institutes:

- UCL Anthropology
- UCL Department of Economics
- UCL Department of Geography
- UCL History Department
- UCL History of Art Department
- UCL Institute of the Americas
- UCL Institute of Archaeology
- UCL Department of Political Science & School of Public Policy
- UCL Institute of Advanced Studies

== Research ==
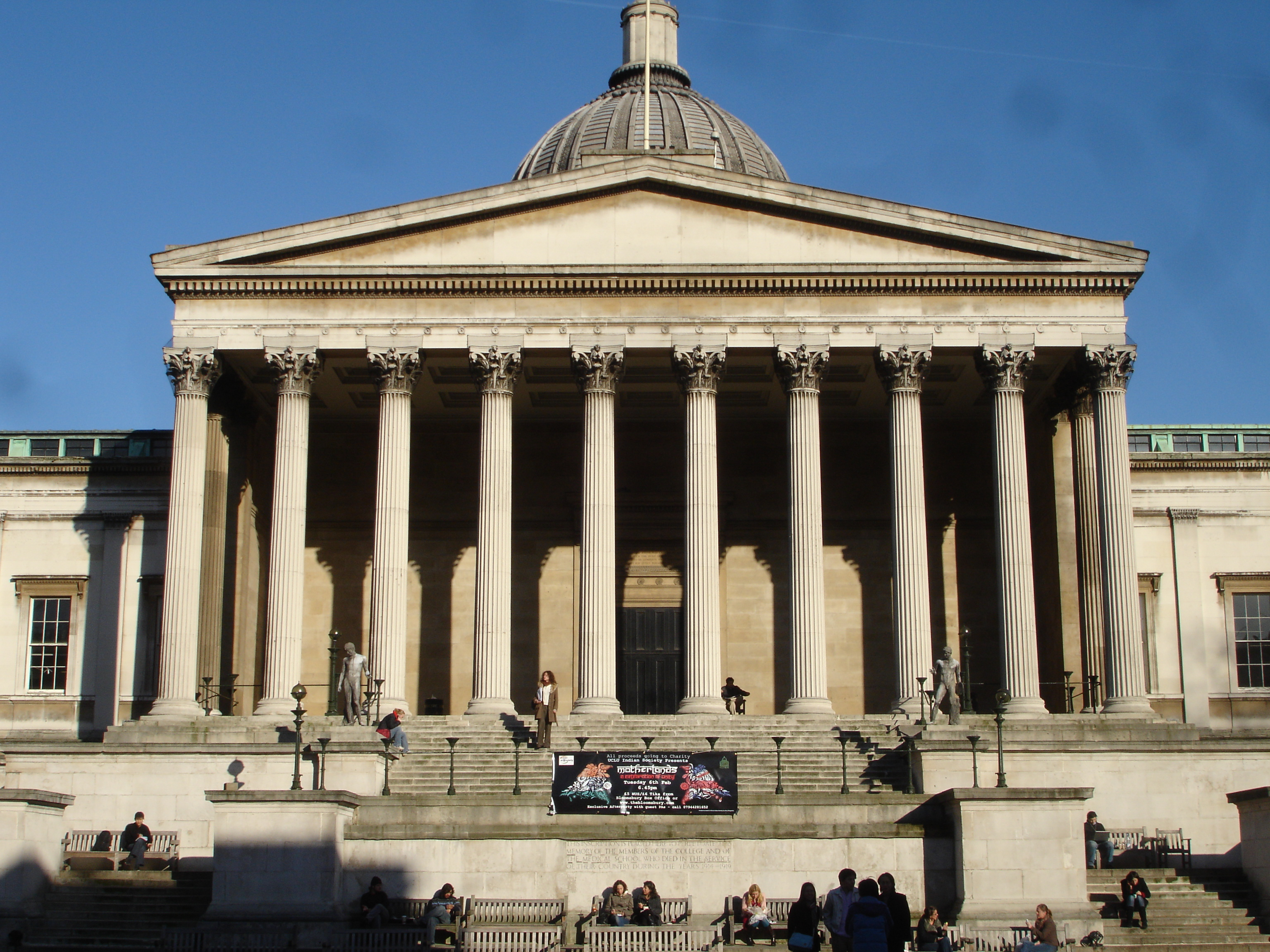
University College London

The Faculty is closely involved with the following research centres and institutes:

- Centre for Applied Archaeology
- Centre for Audio-Visual Study and Practice in Archaeology
- Centre for Digital Anthropology
- Centre for Medieval and Renaissance Studies
- Centre for Microdata Methods and Practice
- Centre for Museums, Heritage and Material Culture Studies
- Centre for Research on the Dynamics of Civilisation (CREDOC)
- Centre for Terrestrial Carbon Dynamics
- Centre for the Evaluation of Development Policies
- Centre for Transnational History
- China Centre for Health & Humanity
- Climate and Water Research Unit
- Coastal and Estuarine Research Centre
- Constitution Unit
- Environment Institute
- Environmental Change Research Centre
- Institute for Subjectivity and the Cultural Imagination
- International Centre for Chinese Heritage and Archaeology
- Laboratory for the Ethnography of the UK
- Migration Research Unit
- The Equiano Centre
- Urban Lab

== Rankings ==
In the 2020 Times Higher Education World University Rankings, UCL is ranked 11th in the world (and 4th in Europe) for Social Sciences, and sixth globally (third in Europe) in Arts and Humanities.

In the 2020 QS World University Rankings by subject, UCL is ranked eighth (fourth in Europe) for Geography, 17th (fifth in Europe) for Economics & Econometrics, 17th for History, and 44th for Politics and International Studies.

== See also ==
- London School of Economics
- School of Advanced Study
- School of Oriental and African Studies
