= Anna Vignoles =

British economist and educationalist

Anna Vignoles CBE FBA
- Born: Anna Frances Vignoles

Academic background
- Education: Newcastle University; SOAS University of London

Anna Frances Vignoles CBE FBA is a British educationalist and economist. She is the Director of the Leverhulme Trust, taking up her position in January 2021. Previously, she was Professor of Education and fellow of Jesus College at the University of Cambridge, where her research focused on the economic value of education and issues of equity in education. She was elected as a fellow of the British Academy in 2017.

Vignoles also held the following positions until taking on her current role: Trustee of The Nuffield Foundation; Member of the ESRC Council; Co-Chair, Cambridge Centre for Data Driven Discovery (C2D3), University of Cambridge; Board Member, Cambridge Enterprise; Member of the advisory board of the Sutton Trust; Associate Editor, Education Economics and The Cambridge Journal of Education

== Early life ==
She was born in the Philippines. She is the daughter of Ampleforth-educated Philippe (Philip) Maurice Vignoles (23 March 1943 - 24 January 2002) of East Horsley and Lucy Ronca from Amberley, Gloucestershire, who married at Woodchester Priory on Saturday 4 June 1966, conducted by Roman Catholic John Petit (bishop).

Charles Blacker Vignoles FRS is her great-great grandfather. Her grandfather's first marriage was in 1900 in Essex; Walter Adolph Vignoles served as a Lt Col in the Royal Northumberland Fusiliers in WWI, later living in Grimsby; he remarried in 1942 in Middlesex, living in East Horsley until 1953. The musician Roger Vignoles is the son of her father's elder half-brother (born in Grimsby); her half-cousin.

== Research ==
Anna’s work is in the area of Economics of Education, with a key focus on the economic value of education. She researches the ways in which the school system does or does not improve social mobility and ensures that people have the skills they need for the modern labour market. She is known for her work using large scale data to illuminate the unequal educational and economic outcomes for children growing up in various family circumstances, as well as her research into how well the education system is meeting the needs of both individuals and the wider economy. Her research has suggested ways to reduce the large socioeconomic inequalities in education achievement that are present in the UK.

== Academic career ==
Vignoles received a BA Hons in Economics with Politics from SOAS, University of London and earned her PhD from Newcastle University in 1998.

Since then she has held many positions including Research Fellow at IZA in 2008 and prior to her appointment as Professor of Education at the University of Cambridge, she was Professor of Economics of Education at the UCL Institute of Education, Research Fellow at the London School of Economics Centre for Economic Performance, and Deputy Director of the Centre for the Economics of Education. She was a fellow of the Institute of Fiscal Studies from 2011 to 2015.

== Awards and honours ==
Wonk of the Year 2018, WonkHE

Winner of the British Education Journal Annual Editors' Choice Award 2016

Winner of the Economic Journal exceptional contribution to reviewing 2017

She was appointed Commander of the Order of the British Empire (CBE) in the 2019 Birthday Honours for services to social sciences.
