= Paul Johnson (economist) =

British economist and civil servant

Paul Johnson CBE FAcSS

Provost of The Queen's College, Oxford
- Incumbent
- Assumed office 2025
- Preceded by: Claire Craig

Director of the Institute for Fiscal Studies
- In office 2011–2025
- Preceded by: Robert Chote
- Succeeded by: Helen Miller

Personal details
- Born: 5 January 1967 (age 59)

Academic background
- Education: Keble College, Oxford; Birkbeck, University of London

Academic work
- Discipline: Economics
- Sub-discipline: Public economics; microeconomics
- Institutions: Institute for Fiscal Studies; University College London; The Queen's College, Oxford

Paul Gavin Johnson CBE FAcSS (born 5 January 1967) is a British economist. Since 2025, he has been the provost of The Queen's College, Oxford. He served as director of the Institute for Fiscal Studies from 2011 until 2025. He is also a columnist for The Times, and a visiting professor in Economics at the Department of Economics, University College London. He is author of the best selling book Follow the Money and a frequent contributor to written and broadcast media.

== Early life and education ==
The son of Robert and Joy Johnson, he was educated at Kings Manor School, Shoreham-by-Sea. Having won a college scholarship, he studied Politics, Philosophy, and Economics at Keble College, Oxford, and graduated with a first class honours Bachelor of Arts (BA) degree. He undertook postgraduate studies in economics at Birkbeck College, London, graduating with a Master of Science (MSc) degree.

== Career ==
Johnson's first job was at the Institute for Fiscal Studies, where he remained from 1988 to 1998, in the last two years serving as a deputy director.

From September 1998 to January 1999 he was an advisor on pensions and welfare reform in the Cabinet Office. He was also head of Economics of Financial Regulation at the Financial Services Authority, 1998–2000, before being appointed as chief economist and director of analytical services to the Department for Education and Employment, soon renamed as the Department for Education and Skills, remaining until 2004. That year he went to HM Treasury as Director of Public Services and Chief Micro-Economist, continuing in post until 2007. He was also deputy head of the Government Economic Service from 2005 to 2007.

Between 2007 and 2010 he was a senior associate at Frontier Economics. In 2011 he was appointed as director of the Institute for Fiscal Studies.

Johnson was a member of the Economic and Social Research Council from 2002 to 2007 and a member of the Committee on Climate Change from 2012 to 2023.

He has carried out reviews of automatic pension enrolment for the government, inflation measurement for the UK Statistics Authority and of tax devolution for the Northern Ireland Executive.

On 17 October 2024, his pre-election as provost of The Queen's College, Oxford was announced. He succeeded Claire Craig as provost on 1 August 2025.

=== Views ===
In November 2022 Johnson stated the government was "reaping the costs of a long-term failure to grow the economy", together with an ageing population and high borrowing levels. Johnson maintained the nation became much poorer; conditions were, he said, worse than necessary due to "a series of economic own goals." Johnson stated "own goals" included "reducing investment spending" and reduced spending on vocational and further education. Johnson maintained Brexit was economically damaging and said that the September 2022 United Kingdom mini-budget was obviously unhelpful.

Johnson has said the UK political system is made up of technocratic, ideological and democratic elements, and that a purely technocrat government "would be a disaster" because it "wouldn't be listening to the people." Political decisions are often difficult trade-offs made with imperfect knowledge of future outcomes.

== Honours ==
In the 2018 Queen's Birthday Honours, Johnson was appointed Commander of the Order of the British Empire (CBE) "for services to the social sciences and economics". He was elected a Fellow of the Academy of Social Sciences (FAcSS) in 2018.

He holds honorary doctorates from University College London and the universities of Exeter, Sussex and York. He is an honorary fellow of his alma mater Keble College, Oxford.

== Personal life ==
Johnson has four sons with economist Lorraine Dearden. They were divorced in 2021 and he now lives with his new partner Nicola Wilberforce, a teacher, in Highgate.

== Selected publications ==
- Inequality in the UK (with A), 1996
- Pension Systems and Retirement Incomes Across OECD Countries (contributor), 2001
- Tax by Design: the Mirrless review (editor), 2011
- Follow the Money: How Much Does Britain Cost? (author), Abacus Books, 2023
