= Wendy Carlin =

Australian/ British Professor of Economics

Dame Wendy Carlin DBE FBA
- Born: Wendy Joan Carlin; 1957 (age 68–69)
- Spouse: Andrew Glyn (died 2007)
- Children: 2

Academic background
- Education: University of Oxford

Academic work
- Discipline: Macroeconomics
- Institutions: University College London
- Awards: DBE (2015); Rhodes Scholarship
- Website: Information at IDEAS / RePEc

Dame Wendy Joan Carlin DBE FBA (born 1957) is a professor of economics at University College London, expert advisor to the Office for Budget Responsibility, and research fellow at the Centre for Economic Policy Research. Her research focuses on macroeconomics, institutions and economic performance, and the economics of transition.

== Early life and education ==
Carlin was born in 1957, her father Brian Frederick Carlin was an agricultural scientist. Carlin completed her undergraduate education at Murdoch University, Australia in 1978. She then went on to study for a master's degree and a DPhil degree at the University of Oxford on a Rhodes Scholarship, finishing in 1987. Her thesis was entitled The development of the factor distribution of income and profitability in West Germany, 1945-1973 and was supervised by Andrea Boltho. In her early academic career, Carlin focused on contemporary economics and economic history, and in particular, West Germany. The statistician John Carlin is her brother.

== Career ==
During her doctoral studies, Carlin was a lecturer in economics at Christ Church, Oxford. After her doctorate she moved to the Department of Economics at UCL where she has remained since. She was appointed professor at UCL in 2002.

In 2000, Carlin became a research fellow at the Centre for Economic Policy Research. Since 2011, Carlin has been a member of the expert advisory board to the Office for Budget Responsibility. Between 2000 and 2015 she was co-managing editor (with Philippe Aghion) of Economics of Transition.

In 2013, Carlin was one of the founders of Curriculum Open-access Resources in Economics (CORE), for which she is now the director. CORE is a new introductory course in economics provided free to students and teachers, hoping to "reform the undergraduate economics curriculum", in which economists "will learn to use evidence from history, experiments and other data sources to test competing explanations and policies". CORE is funded by grants from various organisations, including Open Society Foundations, Friends Provident Foundation and Nuffield Foundation and is based in the Economics Department at University College London. The CORE project has produced an interactive open-access e-book for an introductory course in economics, currently being used at universities around the world such as UCL, Sciences Po, Toulouse School of Economics, Humboldt University, and many more.

In 2015, she became a member of the council of the Royal Economic Society.

Carlin has written three books, all coauthored with David Soskice:

- Macroeconomics and the Wage Bargain: A Modern Approach to Employment, Inflation and the Exchange Rate (1990)
- Macroeconomics: Imperfections, Institutions and Policies (2006)
- Macroeconomics: Institutions, Instability and the Financial System (2015)

The third book integrates the financial system into the macroeconomic model to allow for analysis of financial cycles as well as business cycles and growth.

Since 2019, Carlin has served as an External Professor to the Santa Fe Institute.

== Awards and honours ==
In September 2014, Carlin was awarded an honorary degree in economics from Murdoch University.

In 2016, Carlin was appointed a CBE in the New Year Honours, for services to economics and public finance. She was elevated to DBE in the 2026 New Year Honours.

Carlin received the 2019 Economics Network Outstanding Career Achievement in Economics Education award.

She is a fellow of the European Economic Association and was elected a Fellow of the British Academy in 2023.

== Personal life ==
Carlin was married to University of Oxford economics lecturer Andrew Glyn, with whom she had two children. Glyn died in December 2007 from brain cancer.
