= Helen Miller (economist) =

British economist

Director, IFS
- Incumbent
- Assumed office July 2025
- Preceded by: Paul Johnson

Personal details
- Education: UCL BSc, MSc
- Occupation: Economist
- Website: Helen Miller

Helen Miller is a British economist who has been serving as Director of the Institute for Fiscal Studies in London since July 2025. She succeeded Paul Johnson who left the IFS after 14 years to become the Provost of The Queen's College, Oxford.

In interviews, and columns, Miller has discussed issues of taxation, the state of the UK economy, and the economic policies of the British government.
