= Sandra McNally =

Irish economist (born 1972)

- Born: July 1972 (age 53–54)

Academic background
- Education: Trinity College Dublin; University College London

Sandra McNally (born July 1972) is an Irish economist, who is Professor of Economics at the University of Surrey and works at the Centre for Economic Performance (CEP), at the London School of Economics (LSE). Her research interests include economic evaluation of government policies in schools and further education and labor market returns to education and training.

== Early life ==
Sandra McNally was born in Dublin. She has two half-brothers, and a sister and brother.

She has a BA in Economics from Trinity College, Dublin, studying from 1990 to 1994. She has an MSc in Environmental Economics, studying from 1994 to 1995, and a Ph.D. from University College London (UCL) in January 2003.

== Career ==
From 1995 to 2001 Sandra McNally worked as an economist at the Centre for Ecology and Hydrology at Abbots Ripton in Cambridgeshire.

=== LSE ===
In September 2001, Sandra McNally joined the Centre for Economic Performance at the LSE. From October 2002 she also carried out work for the Centre for the Economics of Education think tank, being the Deputy Director from January 2005 to December 2009. In October 2007 she became Director of the Education and Skills Programme at the CEP.

She is the Director of the Education and Skills Programme at the CEP at the LSE, working in education economics. She carries out research into education performance. She has produced reports in conjunction with Prof Stephen Machin, the Director of the CEP.

In March 2015 she became Director of the Centre for Vocational Education Research at the LSE. The centre had been launched in March 2015; there is comparatively much less research on the FE sector in the UK than on other sectors; this sector is also described as tertiary education. There is also the Further Education Trust for Leadership, launched in 2014.

=== University of Surrey ===
In April 2012, she became Professor of Economics at the University of Surrey, in its School of Economics.

== Research ==
McNally's area of research is economics of education; evaluation of school-level policies and post-16 education. In May 2007, she wrote a 'fact checking' report for i on education spending in the UK.

More specifically, McNally co-wrote a journal article about "The cost of just failing high stakes exams". A subtopic of her main research focus, this article focused on the long term consequences of failing a national examination in England. McNally also wrote an article in April 2020 about how effective apprenticeships are in England. This article attempted to quantify whether undertaking and apprenticeship yielded a positive return for young people entering the labor market, and how this stacks up against other paths one could take.

== See also ==
- Category:Education finance in the United Kingdom
- Economy of the Republic of Ireland
