= Roger Vignoles =

British pianist and accompanist

Roger Vignoles (born 12 July 1945) is a British pianist and accompanist. He performs and makes recordings with singers and instrumentalists, and is Prince Consort Professor of Collaborative Piano at Royal College of Music in London.

== Education ==
He lists Gerald Moore as his inspiration for pursuing a career in accompaniment. He read music at Magdalene College, Cambridge, then joined the Royal Opera House as a repetiteur before completing his training with Paul Hamburger. He is widely recorded and generally regarded as one of the foremost piano accompanists alive today.

He first studied at Magdalene College (Cambridge) and the Royal College of Music, where he is now Prince Consort Professor of Piano accompaniment.

== Career ==
Roger Vignoles has performed with the world's leading singers, including Kiri Te Kanawa, Thomas Allen, Anne Sofie von Otter, Thomas Hampson, Gitta-Maria Sjöberg, Sarah Walker, Sylvia McNair, Susan Graham, Christine Brewer, Felicity Lott, Stephan Genz, Monica Groop, Wolfgang Holzmair, Bernarda Fink, Christine Schäfer, Brigitte Fassbaender, Kathleen Battle and Roderick Williams.

Vignoles has also accompanied instrumentalists such as Joshua Bell, Heinrich Schiff, Nobuko Imai and Ralph Kirshbaum.

Vignoles is Prince Consort Professor of Collaborative Piano at Royal College of Music in London., and gives masterclasses around the world.

He has devised and directed several series at the Queen Elizabeth Hall and Wigmore Hall in London, most notably Landscape Into Song for the Schubert bicentennial. Since 1998, he is artistic director of the Nagaoka Festival in Japan.

His discography contains several recordings which have received international awards.

== Personal ==
Vignoles was born in Cheltenham, the son of Keith Hutton Vignoles TD (1905-1991) and Phyllis Mary née Pearson (1907–1994); he is the great-great grandson of Charles Blacker Vignoles.

Roger's son Will Vignoles is a member of the British indie band Cajun Dance Party on XL records. Anna Vignoles is his half-cousin (daughter of his father's half-brother, after his grandfather remarried).
