= Matthew Gandy =

English geographer (born 1965)

Matthew Gandy, FBA (born 1965 in London) is a geographer and urbanist. He is professor of cultural and historical geography and fellow of King's College, Cambridge, moving from University College London (UCL) in 2015, where he was the founder and first director of the UCL Urban Laboratory from 2005 to 2011.

== Career ==
His research on environmental history, urban infrastructure and visual culture has involved work in countries including France, Germany, Nigeria, India, the UK and the USA. In 2003 he was winner of the Spiro Kostof Prize of the Society of Architectural Historians for Concrete and clay: reworking nature in New York City as the book "within the last two years that has made the greatest contribution to our understanding of urbanism and its relationship with architecture". In 2005 he set up the UCL Urban Laboratory as an international and interdisciplinary centre for urban research and teaching and in 2006 he was a founder of the London-wide Urban Salon. In 2007 he produced and directed a documentary film, Liquid City (2007), which explores the complexity of water politics in Bombay/Mumbai. In 2015 his book The fabric of space: water, modernity, and the urban imagination won the Meridian Book Award for Outstanding Scholarly Work in Geography, and in 2016 it was awarded the International Planning History Society's prize for the "most innovative book in planning history". In 2016 he was elected as a fellow of the British Academy. In 2017 he produced, wrote, and directed the documentary film, Natura Urbana: the Brachen of Berlin, which charts the dual histories of urban botany and geo-politics in post-war Berlin. In 2023 his book Natura Urbana: ecological constellations in urban space won a John Brinckerhoff Jackson Prize awarded by the Foundation for Landscape Studies and the University of Virginia School of Architecture, and he was elected a fellow of the Academia Europaea.

His current work explores five main themes: landscape (including depictions of nature in the visual arts), infrastructure and urban metabolism (including atmospheres and corporeal geographies), urban bio-diversity, urban epidemiology, and visual methodologies.

He is involved in local issues in Hackney, east London, writes reviews and commentaries for his personal website, and is an urban field ecologist, specialising in entomology, and has written a book on moths.

== Books ==
- Gandy, M. (1994) Recycling and the politics of urban waste. London: Earthscan.
- Gandy, Matthew (2002). Concrete and Clay: Reworking Nature in New York City. The Urban & Industrial Environment Series. Cambridge, Massachusetts: MIT Press.
- Gandy, Matthew; Zumla, Alimuddin, eds. (2003). The return of the white plague: global poverty and the 'new' tuberculosis. Verso. ISBN 9781859846698.
- Frank, Susanne; Gandy, Matthew, eds. (2006). Hydropolis: Wasser und die Stadt der Moderne. Campus. ISBN 9783593380032.
- Gandy, Matthew, ed. (2011). Urban constellations. jovis Verlag. ISBN 9783868591187.
- Gandy, Matthew; Nilsen, B.J., eds. (2014). The acoustic city. jovis Verlag. ISBN 9783868592719.
- Gandy, Matthew (2014). The Fabric of Space: water, modernity, and the urban imagination. Cambridge, Massachusetts: MIT Press. ISBN 9780262028257.
- Gandy, M, 2015. Ecologie queer: Nature, sexualité, et hétéropie. Paris: Eterotopia.
- Gandy, M. 2016. Moth. London: Reaktion Books.
- Gandy, Matthew; Jasper, Sandra, eds. (2020). The botanical city. jovis Verlag. ISBN 9783868595192.
- Gandy, Matthew (2022). Natura Urbana: Ecological Constellations in Urban Space. Cambridge, Massachusetts: MIT Press. ISBN 9780262046282.
