= John Carlin (statistician) =

Australian statistician

Professor Emeritus John Carlin FAHMS
- Education: University of Western Australia; Harvard University
- Known for: Bayesian analysis
- Scientific career
- Fields: Biostatistics
- Workplaces: Murdoch Children's Research Institute; University of Melbourne
- Thesis: Seasonal Analysis of Economic Time Series (1987)
- Doctoral advisors: Arthur P. Dempster; Donald Rubin

John B. Carlin is an Australian statistician. He is Head of Data Science and Director of the Clinical Epidemiology and Biostatistics Unit at the Murdoch Children's Research Institute (MCRI) and a professor in the Centre for Epidemiology and Biostatistics in the Melbourne School of Population and Global Health at the University of Melbourne. He has also led the Victorian Centre for Biostatistics, a collaboration between the MCRI, the University of Melbourne, and Monash University, since 2012. The economist Wendy Carlin is his sister.

Besides Carlin's professorial appointment at the Melbourne School of Population and Global Health, he is also an Honorary Professorial Fellow in the Department of Paediatrics at the University of Melbourne. In 2018, Carlin was elected a Fellow of the Australian Academy of Health and Medical Sciences.

== Selected works ==
- Mainzer, R. M.; Moreno-Betancur, M.; Nguyen, C. D.; Simpson, J. A.; Carlin, J. C.; Lee, K. J. (2024). "Gaps in the usage and reporting of multiple imputation for incomplete data: findings from a scoping review of observational studies addressing causal questions". BMC Medical Research Methodology. 24. doi:10.1186/s12874-024-02302-6. hdl:11343/358623.
- Byrt, Ted; Bishop, Janet; Carlin, John B. (1993). "Bias, prevalence and kappa". Journal of Clinical Epidemiology. 46 (5): 423–429. doi:10.1016/0895-4356(93)90018-V. PMID 8501467.
- Patton, G. C.; Hibbert, M.; Rosier, M. J.; Carlin, J. B.; Caust, J.; Bowes, G. (1996). "Is smoking associated with depression and anxiety in teenagers?". American Journal of Public Health. 86 (2): 225–230. doi:10.2105/AJPH.86.2.225. PMC 1380332. PMID 8633740.
- Patton, G. C.; Selzer, R.; Coffey, C.; Carlin, J. B.; Wolfe, R. (1999). "Onset of adolescent eating disorders: Population based cohort study over 3 years". BMJ. 318 (7186): 765–768. doi:10.1136/bmj.318.7186.765. PMC 27789. PMID 10082698.
- Bond, L.; Carlin, J. B.; Thomas, L.; Rubin, K.; Patton, G. (2001). "Does bullying cause emotional problems? A prospective study of young teenagers". BMJ. 323 (7311): 480–484. doi:10.1136/bmj.323.7311.480. PMC 48131. PMID 11532838.
- Lee, K. J.; Carlin, J. B. (2010). "Multiple Imputation for Missing Data: Fully Conditional Specification Versus Multivariate Normal Imputation". American Journal of Epidemiology. 171 (5): 624–632. doi:10.1093/aje/kwp425. PMID 20106935.
- Gelman, Andrew; Carlin, John B.; Stern, Hal S.; Dunson, David B.; Vehtari, Aki; Rubin, Donald B. (2013). Bayesian Data Analysis, Third Edition. New York, New York: Chapman and Hall. doi:10.1201/b16018. ISBN 9781439898208.
