= Stephen Machin =

British economist (born 1962)

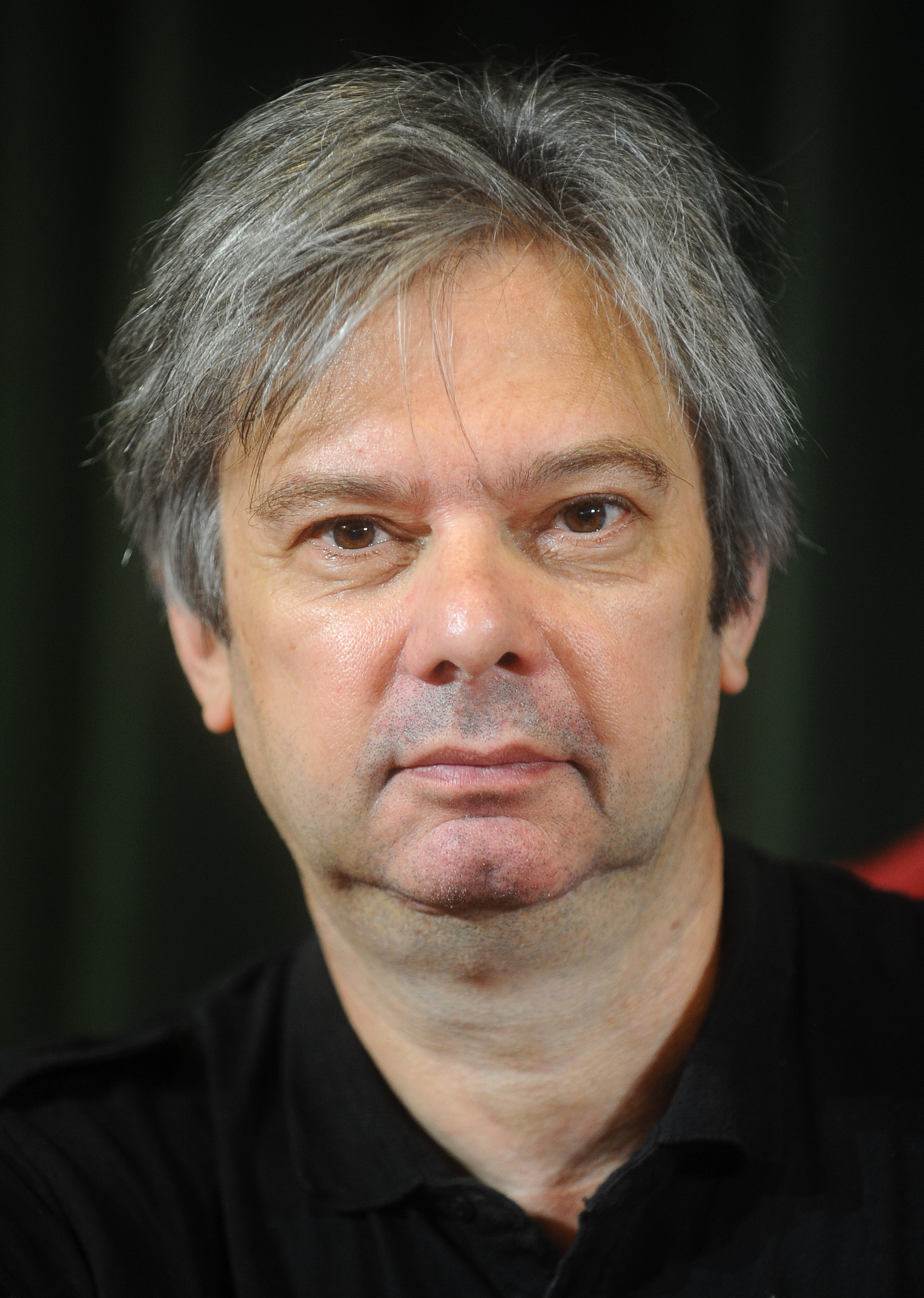
Stephen Machin at the Festival of Economics in Trento in 2018

Stephen Jonathan Machin (born 23 December 1962) is a British economist and professor of economics at the London School of Economics (LSE). Moreover, he is currently director of the Centre for Economic Performance (CEP) and is a fellow of the British Academy, the Society of Labor Economists and the European Economic Association. His current research interests include labor market inequality, the economics of education, and the economics of crime.

== Biography ==
Stephen Machin earned a B.A. in economics from Wolverhampton Polytechnic in 1985 as well as a Ph.D. from the University of Warwick in 1988, wherein he analyzed the impact of trade unions on economic performance. After his Ph.D., he worked first as a lecturer (1988–93), then as a reader (1993–96), and finally as professor of economics at University College London (1996–2016). Since 1994, Machin has repeatedly held positions at the Centre for Economic Performance (CEP) at the London School of Economics (LSE) before becoming CEP's director and accepting a professorship in economics at LSE in 2016. Additionally, Machin has served as director of the Centre for the Economics of Education at LSE (1999–2009) and held visiting appointments at Harvard University (1993–94) and at MIT (2001–02).

In terms of professional service and responsibilities, Stephen Machin is a member of the council of the Royal Economic Society, a fellow of the European Economic Association (EEA), Society of Labor Economists, and British Academy, and an editor of Economica. In the past, Machin has been a council member of the EEA (2014–18), president of the Economics Section of the British Science Association (2013), a president of the European Association of Labour Economists (2009–2011), and was an editor of the Economic Journal (1998–2013) and of the International Journal of Industrial Organization (1995–97).

== Research ==
Stephen Machin's research focuses on labour economics, the economics of education, the economics of crime, and industrial economics. According to IDEAS/RePEc, Machin belongs to the 1% of most-cited economists, in particular ranking 9th among education economists.

=== Labour economics ===
In labour economics, main areas of Machin's research include minimum wages, trends in wage inequality and social mobility, and skill-biased technological change.

In the mid- and late 1990s, following David Card and Alan B. Krueger's re-evaluation of the employment effects of the minimum wage, Stephen Machin (with Alan Manning) conducted research in the U.K. on the subject. In general, they find that the decrease in the ratio between Britain's minimum wage and its average wage significantly contributed to growing wage dispersion in the 1980s but didn't increase employment, which in turn suggests that - with the possible exception of young workers - the minimum wage had either no or a small positive effect on employment. They further argue that this finding extends to other European countries for 1966-1996 and is in line with monopsonistic models of labour demand.

The rise in wage inequality in the United Kingdom from the late 1970s prompted Machin to research the subject, along with developments in intergenerational mobility. Amongst other things, Machin (with Lorraine Dearden and Howard Reed) finds that intergenerational mobility is low in Britain as upward mobility from the bottom of the wage distribution fails to compensate for the rigidity of downward mobility from its top. With regard to wage inequality, Machin, Costas Meghir and Amanda Gosling argue that the growth in British wage inequality in 1978-95 is mainly due to increases in the differences between returns to education and the persistently slow growth of entry level wages. Related to his work on the role of wage-education differentials, Machin has also conducted research on skill-biased technological change. In particular, he finds (with John van Reenen) that the relative demand for skilled workers increased throughout the 1970s and 1980s all across the OECD (and not only in the U.S.) as technical change required workers to upgrade their skills and shows (with Eli Berman and John Bound) that the larger the skill-biased technological change is, the larger its potential to depress the relative wages of less-skilled workers, thus resulting in higher wage inequality.

=== Economics of education ===
In the economics of education, Machin's research ranges from the effect of school quality on property prices, trends in educational inequality, the impacts of school choice, school competition, and ICT in primary education on student achievement to education policy. With Stephen Gibbons, he finds that a 10pp increase in a British neighbourhood in the share of children reaching the grade corresponding to their age increases the neighbourhood's property prices by 6.7%, implying that society values improved primary school performance by up to GBP 90 per year and per child at 2000 property prices. In research with Jo Blanden on educational inequality in the UK, Machin finds that the expansion of British higher education from the 1970s to 1990s has disproportionately benefited children from relatively richer backgrounds and widened participation gaps between rich and poor children. Addressing methodological shortcomings in the earlier literatures, Machin, Gibbons, Sandra McNally and Olmo Silva use IV estimations to study the impact of new technology in British primary schools, of increased school choice for students and of stronger competition between schools on student achievement, and find a positive impact for ICT investments, though generally no or only very limited effects for school choice and competition.

=== Economics of crime ===
A more recent area of Machin's research has been the economics of crime. In particular, Machin and Meghir find a strong negative link between low-skilled workers' wages and crime rates, as well as important effects for crime deterrents and returns to crime, thus further emphasizing the importance of economic incentives for crime. Exploiting changes in compulsory schooling laws in the UK through a regression discontinuity design, Machin, Olivier Marie and Suncica Vujic find that education can substantially reduce (property) crime rates. Finally, Machin, Brian Bell and Francesco Fasani find that the influx of asylum seekers into the UK in the late 1990s and early 2000s modestly increased property crime, whereas the influx of immigrants from eastern European EU members decreased it property crime, with immigration having no effect on violent crime in either case, thus underlining the importance of labour market opportunities as a means to reduce crime rates.

=== Industrial and urban economics ===
Investigating the impact of developing an innovation on British corporations' profitability, Machin, van Reenen and Paul Geroski observe that the indirect effects of innovation on profits due to innovation signalling firms' internal commitment to improving their competitiveness are up to three times as large as the direct effect of producing a new product or using a new, more efficient production process. Around the same time, Machin (with Paul Gregg and Stefan Szymanski) also studied the vanishing relation between directors' pay and their firms performance over the 1980s and early 1990s, finding that directors' pay became completely disconnected from corporate performance around 1988 and was instead driven by corporate growth. Finally, Machin and Gibbons pioneered a new approach to estimating consumers' valuation of rail access through housing prices, finding that local households significantly valued the construction of new stations in the context of improvements to the London Underground and Docklands Light Railway in South East London in the late 1990s.
