= UCL Urban Laboratory =

- Established: 2005
- Research type: Public
- Field of research: Urbanism, architecture, city planning, globalisation
- Director: Prof Catalina Ortiz
- Location: London
- Operating agency: University College London
- Website: ucl.ac.uk/urban-lab

UCL Urban Laboratory is a cross-disciplinary centre for the study of cities and urbanism, based at University College London. It carries out research, education and outreach activities both in London and internationally. The Urban Laboratory was established in 2005. UCL Urban Lab is a department of the Bartlett Faculty of the Built Environment which also co-operates with the faculties of Engineering, Social and Historical Sciences; and Arts and Humanities. The current director and Head of Department is Prof Catalina Ortiz, who took on the role from Dr Clare Melhuish in 2024.

The Urban Laboratory runs a number of urban events programmes promoting urbanism, including the annual international Cities Imaginaries lecture, and in past years the peer-reviewed exhibition Cities Methodologies with the Slade School of Fine Art, and Urban Lab Films, a public programme of talks and film screenings on cities. Cities Methodologies has been described by Monocle as a "marketplace of research ideas, [which] bring lots of different approaches to common urban questions together, and for work to be put in juxtaposition."

From 2013, the Urban Laboratory has been part of the European Union-funded Erasmus Mundus Urban Lab+ international network of Urban Laboratories, an organisation composed of eight international universities in Europe, Africa, Asia, and Latin America. The project seeks to expand and strengthen competence in the realms of architecture, urban planning and other built environment disciplines. Urban Lab is a partner member along with Technische Universität Berlin, École Polytechnique Fédérale de Lausanne, University of Calabria, Pontificia Universidad Católica de Chile, University of the Witwatersrand, Kamla Raheja Vidyanidhi Institute, and the Chinese University of Hong Kong.

In 2012, UCL Urban Laboratory were critical of UCL plans to open a new campus near the site of the Olympic Park in East London on the Carpenters Estate, as detailed in an open letter sent to the university's council. The new campus would have required the demolition of the existing estate and relocation of current residents. The plans detailed in the "UCL Stratford Proposition" attracted considerable press attention and caused a student-led opposition group from UCL Union to 'occupy' a room in UCL's Bloomsbury campus. The main objection of the Urban Laboratory (endorsed by The Bartlett's Development Planning Unit) was that the plan constituted a missed opportunity to draw on the expertise of the UCL community and show leadership in developing a sustainable and socially equitable approach to regeneration. Plans for the new campus were dropped in May 2013 following a failure for UCL and Newham Council to agree to terms.

== Structure ==
The current director of the Urban Laboratory is Prof Catalina Ortiz, who has a background in architecture, urban and regional studies, and urban planning and policy, alongside an academic career focused on critical urban theory, spatial justice and planning for equality.

Between 2011–18, the Urban Lab was directed by urbanist and architectural historian Ben Campkin. He is also a senior lecturer in Architectural History at the Bartlett School of Architecture. He was co-editor of the 2012 book Dirt: New Geographies of Cleanliness and Contamination and writer of the 2013 book Remaking London: Decline and Regeneration in Urban Culture. The latter focuses on gentrification, sink estates and the history of regeneration in five areas of London (Somers Town, Elephant and Castle, Kings Cross, Shoreditch and Hackney Wick).

From 2018–24, the Urban Lab was directed by anthropologist Clare Melhuish.

Former director Matthew Gandy is a geographer and urbanist. He is co-founder of the Urban Salon which links urbanists across London. He has taught geography at UCL since 1997, and before that worked at the University of Sussex between 1992 and 1997.
