= Andrew Chesher =

British economist

- Born: 1948 (age 77–78)

Academic background
- Education: University of Birmingham

Academic work
- Discipline: Econometrics; Microeconomics
- Institutions: University College London
- Website: Information at IDEAS / RePEc

Andrew Chesher, FBA (born 1948) is a British economist and the William Stanley Jevons Professor of Economics and Economic Measurement at the Department of Economics, University College London and Director of the ESRC Centre for Microdata Methods and Practice (CeMMAP) at the Institute for Fiscal Studies. He is a Fellow of the Econometric Society, Foreign Honorary Member of the American Economic Association, and Fellow of the British Academy where he chaired its Economics and Economic History Section from 2009 to 2012. Additionally, Chesher was the President of the Royal Economic Society from 2016 to 2018 and from 2001 to 2005 he was Chair of the Economic and Social Research Council's Research Grants Board.

He has been ranked by the IDEAS database as one of the world's foremost econometricians and his research focuses on microeconometric theory, applications of complex econometric modeling, measurement error models and limited information models. Chesher's work in econometric theory has led to many crucial developments such as methods for measuring and detecting the heterogeneity in individual responses to changes in economic variables.

Chesher graduated with a first-class degree in mathematics, economics, and statistics from the University of Birmingham in 1970. From 1971 to 1983 he lectured in economics at the same university before becoming the head of the department of economics at the University of Bristol in 1987. He lectured in econometrics at the University of Bristol until 1999, when he became a professor of economics at the University College London. In 2000, Chesher founded the Centre for Microdata Methods and Practice as a joint venture by University College London and Institute for Fiscal Studies.

Apart from his career in academia, Chesher has applied much of his theoretical work on real world problems such as highway conditions in Brazil and India which was crucial for developing the World Bank's Highway Design and Maintenance Models. Moreover, his research and modeling of marriage, fertility and labour force participation in Malaysia aided the United Nations Development Program of Malaysia's population policy in the 1990s.
