= Constitution Unit =

UK research centre

The Constitution Unit
- Established: 1995
- Location: London, United Kingdom
- Director: Professor Alan Renwick
- Website: www.ucl.ac.uk/constitution-unit

The Constitution Unit is an independent and non-partisan research centre based within the Department of Political Science at University College London. It analyses constitutional change and its effects. The unit was founded in 1995 by Robert Hazell and specialises in the study of parliament and parliamentary reform; elections and referendums; monarchy, church, and state; devolution; constitution-making; freedom of information legislation; courts and the legal system; and the relationship between the UK and EU.

== Background ==
The Constitution Unit was founded by Robert Hazell in 1995 to conduct detailed research and planning on constitutional reform in the UK. It aims to help policy-makers involved in constitution-making processes by researching constitutional and political developments in and beyond the UK and by assessing the effects of reforms that have taken place.

Since 1995 the unit has produced over 150 reports and briefings on various aspects of constitutional reform, as well as numerous books and articles. Unit members have also frequently acted as advisers to government and parliament, and regularly provide evidence to parliamentary committees and appear in the media.

== Activities ==
The Constitution Unit’s stated aim is to "conduct rigorous, independent research into constitutional change and its consequences with significant real-world impact: informing policy-makers engaged in constitutional reform both in the United Kingdom and around the world."

Historically, the unit has published extensively on issues including Freedom of Information, judicial appointments and devolution.

The current Director, Professor Meg Russell, is a well-known expert on the UK parliament, and on two-chamber parliaments (i.e. bicameralism) around the world. The unit has produced many reports and papers on the House of Lords and its reform, and most recently its work on parliament has focused extensively on the extent to which both the House of Commons and the House of Lords influence policy. Two of Russell’s reports have had particular real-world impact. One, in 2000, explored the legality of all women shortlists for selection of parliamentary candidates, and was followed by legislation to make such shortlists explicitly legal. Another, in 2007, recommended establishment of a Backbench Business Committee for the House of Commons. This recommendation was subsequently taken up by the Select Committee on the Reform of the House of Commons (the ‘Wright committee’) and implemented in 2010.

A 2009 study by the Constitution Unit titled "Making Minority Parliament Work: Hung Parliaments and the Challenges for Westminster and Whitehall" led to the publication of a Cabinet manual by the British Government in December 2010. The Constitution Unit, in partnership with the London-based Institute for Government, played a key role in the writing of the Manual.

Following the appointment of Professor Alan Renwick as deputy director, the unit has increasingly focused on deliberative democracy and constitution-making. In 2015, the unit contributed to the organisation of a citizens’ assembly on English Devolution run by Democracy Matters. In autumn 2017, it ran another citizen’s assembly, this time on the issue of Brexit. The Unit also established an Independent Commission on Referendums including senior politicians, public officials and academics. It considered the role and conduct of referendums in the UK, and reported in July 2018.

The Unit has regularly contributed to the discussion surrounding Brexit, notably concerning how Brexit is playing out in parliament and what the outlook is for a further referendum. In October 2018, it published a report titled “The Mechanics of a Further Referendum on Brexit”. The report’s suggestion that such a referendum would take 22 weeks at a minimum was widely referenced during the ongoing debate.

In addition to publications, the Constitution Unit runs a regular series of public seminars on these and other related topics. Contributors include politicians, journalists, academics from the UK and overseas, and various public officials.

== Directors ==
- Robert Hazell (1995 - 2015)
- Meg Russell (2015 - 2026)
- Alan Renwick (2026 - present)

== Publications ==
The Constitution Unit publishes a triannual newsletter called Monitor. This contains analysis of constitutional developments in the UK and overseas, and details about the Unit’s research and publications. It also has a blog that features regular posts from academics and practitioners covering a wide range of constitutional issues in the UK and overseas. A full list of the Unit’s publications can be found on its website.

== Legacy ==
The Constitution Unit Archive is housed at the British Library. The papers can be accessed through the British Library catalogue.
