= Alan Manning =

British economist

- Born: 1960 (age 65–66); United Kingdom

Academic background
- Education: Clare College, Cambridge; Nuffield College, Oxford
- Doctoral advisor: James Mirrlees

Academic work
- Discipline: Labour economics
- Institutions: London School of Economics; Birkbeck, University of London
- Notable ideas: Minimum wage, gender pay gap, monopsony
- Website: Information at IDEAS / RePEc

Alan Manning (born 1960) is a British economist and professor of economics at the London School of Economics.

Manning is one of the leading labour economists globally, having made major contributions to the analysis of the imperfections of labour markets, the minimum wage literature, migration, and job polarization.

== Education ==
Alan Manning studied from 1978 to 1981 at Clare College, Cambridge, and from 1981 to 1984 at Nuffield College, Oxford, obtaining a BA (Hons) and a MPhil in economics before graduating with a DPhil in economics from Oxford University in 1985.

== Later life and career ==
After his MPhil, Manning began working at Birkbeck College as lecturer, a position that he held until 1989 when he moved to another lectureship at the London School of Economics. At LSE, he was promoted first to reader in 1993 and then to professor in 1997, a position he has held ever since. At LSE, Manning has been the Director of the Labour Markets and Community Programmes of the Centre for Economic Performance since 2000. Throughout his career, Manning has held editorial positions at the Review of Economic Studies, Labour Economics, New Economy, Economica, Journal of Labor Economics, Applied Economics Journal, and European Economic Review. His contributions to labour economics were rewarded with a fellowship of the Society of Labor Economists in 2014. He was elected fellow of the European Economic Association in 2021.

== Research ==
Alan Manning's research concentrates on labour economics, with a focus on unemployment, minimum wages, monopsony, immigration and gender pay gaps in the UK and Europe. According to IDEAS/RePEc, Manning belongs to the top 1% of economists in terms of research output. In his research, Manning has been a frequent collaborator of Stephen Machin, another British labour economist.

=== Research on wages, wage bargaining and unemployment ===
Manning's first area of research has been wage bargaining. This research included the integration of trade union models in a sequential bargaining framework, the relationship between the tax system and wage bargaining in the UK (with Ben Lockwood), and the impact of wage bargaining on the link between unemployment and inflation (the Phillips curve). In the late 1980s, in work with George Alogoskoufis, Manning argued that workers' reluctance to reduce their wage expectations, along with firms' slow adjustment of employment, was among the main reasons for persistently high European unemployment. In the late 1990s, Manning and Machin also investigated the topic of long-term unemployment.

=== Research on minimum wages ===
From the mid-1990s on, Manning turned his attention to the study of minimum wages, especially in the UK. Together with Stephen Machin, he found that decreases in the ratio of minimum wages to average wages in the UK in the 1980s had contributed to the growing wage dispersion without raising employment., a finding maintained in further work with Machin and Richard Dickens on the UK. Motivated by his research in the UK and further research by Card, Krueger and Katz in the US, Manning showed how, contrary to conventional wisdom, the theoretical effects of minimum wages on employment are ambiguous, with e.g. a binding minimum wage potentially raising employment even in the presence of involuntary unemployment. At the European level, in joint work several co-authors, Manning found that minimum wages in Europe between the mid-1960s and mid-1990s only caused higher unemployment if they kept the wages of low-wage jobs from decreasing, were relatively small for young people relative to average earnings when compared to the U.S., and didn't appear to have reduced employment, except possibly for young workers. In the early 2000s, Manning studied the impact of the UK National Minimum Wage (NMW) Act of 1998, finding e.g. in a study with Machin and Lupin Rahman that the NMW reduced wage inequality in the heavily industries such as the residential care homes industry by compressing the bottom of the wage distribution, while also reducing employment and hours worked, though further research with Dickens suggested that the NMW's impact on wage inequality was overall limited due to only affecting 6–7% of UK workers directly. More recently, together with Ghazala Asmat and John van Reenen, Manning has studied the impact of the deregulation of product and labour markets in the OECD on the wage share, finding that, on average, privatization accounts for a firth of the decrease in labour's share between 1980 and 2000, but for nearly half in Britain and France.

=== Research on imperfect competition in labour markets ===
Since the 1990s, Manning has researched the impact of employers' market power in labour markets and its impact on especially wages, e.g. in the UK. This research agenda was popularized in a JEP article by Manning, Bhaskar and To, research on modern monopsonies in the UK, and, perhaps most importantly, in Monopsony in Motion, a book that comprehensively sets out Manning's thinking about modern monopsonies in labour markets and was received with mixed reviews by other economists. A comprehensive survey of imperfect competition in the labour market by Manning was published in the Handbook of Labor Economics.

=== Research on gender in labour markets ===
Another important field in Manning's research are gender-specific issues in labour market outcomes. Together with Azmat and Maia Guell, Manning shows that, in countries with large gender gaps in unemployment rates, there also are large gender gaps in flows between employment and unemployment, possibly due to the combination of gender differences in human capital and its interaction with labour market institutions. In a study with Barbara Petrongolo on the part-time pay penalty for women in the UK, Manning attributes half of the penalty to differences in the characteristics of female full-time and part-time workers, especially occupational segregation, which also explains most of its growth in the 1980s and 1990s. Finally, in work with Joanna Swaffield, Manning has also studied the gender gap in early-career wage growth in the UK.

=== Research on job polarization ===
A more recent field of Manning's research is the study of technological change and job polarization. In the mid-2000s, in the wake of research by Autor, Levy and Murnane, Manning argued that the demand for the least-skilled jobs may be growing, albeit dependent on the physical proximity to the more-skilled. In his most highly cited publication, together with Maarten Goos, Manning showed that the UK had experienced since 1975 a pattern of polarization with rises in employment shares in the highest- and lowest-wage occupations and a "hollowing out" of medium-wage occupations, a pattern consistent with Autor et al.'s "routinization" hypothesis; for the 1970s to the 1990s, this polarization accounts for, respectively, half and one third of the growth in wage inequality in the upper and lower parts of the UK wage distribution. This finding – the concentration of employment in low- and high-paid jobs with high non-routine task contents – was maintained in further research by Manning and Goos with Anna Salomons on overall Europe, wherein routine-biased technological change and offshoring play key roles.

=== Research on immigration and identity ===
One of Manning's most recent research endeavours concerns the analysis of immigration and identity. For instance, together with Dustmann, Glitz and Algan, he found that in the UK, France and partly also in Germany, the gap between natives and immigrants in terms of educational achievement decreases over generations, though overall in all three countries the labour market performance of most immigrant groups as well as their descendants is still generally worse than that of natives, even if differences in education, regional allocation and experience are taken into account. In research with Sanchari Roy on the extent and determinants of British identity, he found that "the vast majority of those born in Britain, of whatever ethnicity or religion, think of themselves as British", while "newly arrived immigrants almost never think of themselves as British but the longer they remain in the UK, the more likely it is that they do". Finally, in a study with Marco Manacorda and Jonathan Wadsworth on the impact of immigration to the UK on the structure of wages, Manning found that immigration primarily reduced the wages of immigrants – and in particular university-educated immigrants – with little effect on the wages of the native-born, suggesting that UK natives and foreign born workers are imperfect substitutes.

== Bibliography ==
- Manning, Alan (2003). Monopsony in Motion: Imperfect Competition in Labor Markets. Princeton: Princeton University Press. ISBN 0691113122
