= Erasmus University College =

- Type: Public Liberal Arts College
- Established: 2013
- Affiliations: Erasmus University Rotterdam
- Director: Renate de Groot
- Students: 650
- Location: Nieuwemarkt 1A, Rotterdam, South Holland, Netherlands
- Campus: Urban, 1.111 acres (4,500 m^{2})
- Colors: Erasmus orange
- Website: www.eur.nl/en/euc
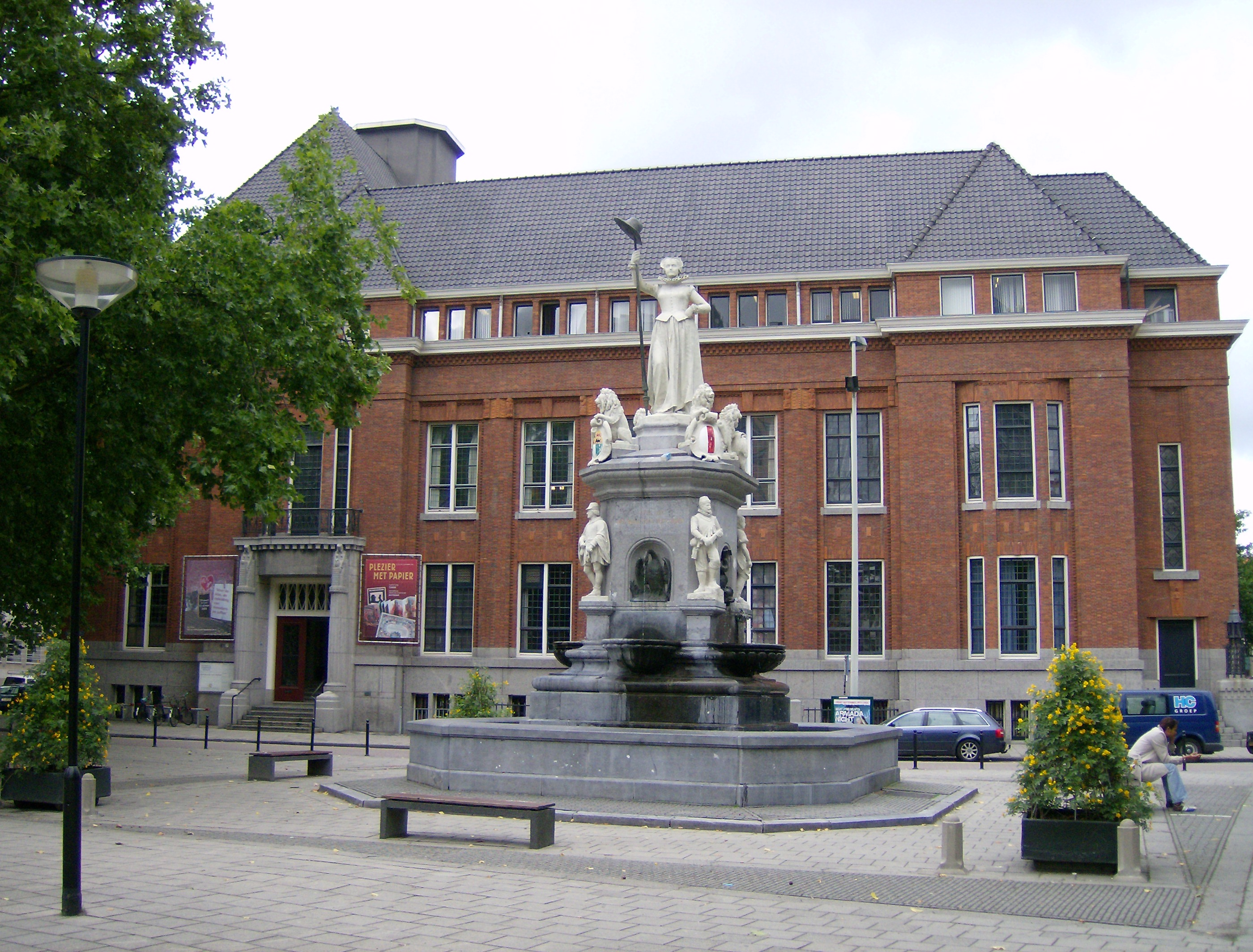

Erasmus University College (EUC) is a public Liberal Arts and Sciences University College situated in Rotterdam, South Holland, the Netherlands. It is the undergraduate honours college of the Erasmus University Rotterdam, offering its students a BSc degree in Liberal Arts & Sciences.

== History ==
Erasmus University College was established in 2013 under the Erasmus School of Social & Behavioural Sciences (ESSB), which itself is a part of the Erasmus University Rotterdam (EUR).

EUC had 85 students in its opening year. However the enrolment has been increasing to reach 218 admitted students per cohort. The limit of 218 is due to the size of mandatory first-year housing for its students. However, this amount was surpassed in 2021, causing students to look for housing elsewhere.

== Academics ==
Erasmus University Rotterdam awards degrees to graduates of Erasmus University College. The admission procedure at Erasmus University College includes interviews and motivational letters in addition to the entry criteria. After completing a first year of interdisciplinary coursework and academic skills known as the Academic Core, students concentrate in a major from one of its departments: Humanities, Social & Behavioural Sciences, Economics & Business, or Life Sciences. Students take the courses necessary for their major throughout their second and third years at EUC.

The Student Academic Affairs Council (SAAC) and the Erasmus University College Study Association (EUCSA) are the two student-led bodies at EUC.

== Location ==
Erasmus University College is located in the center of Rotterdam, on the Nieuwemarkt square. Currently, first-year EUC students reside in the mandatory student housing on Stadhuisplein.

== Architecture ==
The Central Library of Rotterdam, built between 1917 and 1923, was the initial purpose of the building that now hosts Erasmus University College. The structure was planned with the assistance of Nicolaas Lansdorp (1885-1968), Johannes Poot (1892–1976), and D.B. Logemann (1884-1964). The building was modelled by "Amsterdamse School" architecture and has ornate brickwork, period-appropriate interior woodwork, and natural masonry.

The structure survived the German bombardment of Rotterdam in 1940, but the aftermath resulted in the loss of its bell tower. As one of the few intact structures in the city centre, The Central Library served as a meeting place for the urban designers entrusted with planning the reconstruction of Rotterdam. In the middle of the 20th century, the structure housed a museum of education. Erasmus University was scheduled to move into the building in 2011, after the City of Rotterdam and Erasmus University reached an agreement on a proposal to transfer the future college near the city centre. The structure was updated in accordance with the architect Erick van Egeraat's plans. More than 20 million euros were spent on the refurbishment.
