= Barbara Sianesi =

Italian economist

Barbara Sianesi is an Italian economist currently a senior research economist at the Institute for Fiscal Studies in London. She obtained her PhD from University College London and a BA in economics from Bocconi University.

She is a fellow at the Institute of Labor Economics. Sianesi is the 94th most cited woman in economics according to the IDEAS.

== Research ==
Sianesi's research focuses on unemployment, inequality, econometrics, education economics and experimental economics. Her five most quoted papers have been quoted over 5,796 times according to Google Scholar. Her research has been quoted by the Associated Press. Her dissertation was titled "Essays on the Evaluation of Social Programmes and Educational Qualifications".

Her research has been published in The Review of Economics and Statistics, the Journal of the Royal Statistical Society, the Journal of Economic Surveys, and Fiscal Studies.

Her contribution to the literature includes code on ways to improve propensity score matching.

=== Selected publications ===
- Blundell, Richard; Dearden, Lorraine; Meghir, Costas; Sianesi, Barbara (1999). "Human Capital Investment: The Returns from Education and Training to the Individual, the Firm and the Economy". Fiscal Studies. 20 (1): 1–23.
- Sianesi, Barbara (2004-02-01). "An Evaluation of the Swedish System of Active Labor Market Programs in the 1990s". The Review of Economics and Statistics. 86 (1): 133–155.
- Sianesi, Barbara; Reenen, John Van (2003). "The Returns to Education: Macroeconomics". Journal of Economic Surveys. 17 (2): 157–200.
- Blundell, Richard; Dearden, Lorraine; Sianesi, Barbara (2005). "Evaluating the effect of education on earnings: models, methods and results from the National Child Development Survey". Journal of the Royal Statistical Society, Series A (Statistics in Society).
