= Centre for Economic Performance =

English research centre

Coordinates: 51.51553°N 0.11483°W

- Formation: 1990
- Headquarters: 32 Lincoln's Inn Fields, London, WC2A 3PH
- Location: London, United Kingdom
- Director: Stephen Machin
- Key people: Stephen Machin, Alan Manning, Sandra McNally, Ralf Martin, Guy Michaels, Catherine Thomas, Richard Layard, Daniel Sturm
- Parent organization: London School of Economics
- Staff: 100+
- Website: Official Website

The Centre for Economic Performance (CEP) is an interdisciplinary research centre at the London School of Economics dedicated to the study of economic growth and effective ways to create a fair, inclusive and sustainable society. Currently led by Stephen Machin, it is one of the world's most prestigious economic research institutes, being the most important economic research institute in the United Kingdom, jointly with the Centre for Economic Policy Research. Its research performance has been particularly strong in the research areas of labour economics, productivity, happiness economics, human capital, the knowledge economy, ICT, innovation, education, and European microeconomic issues.

== History ==
The Centre for Economic Performance was founded in 1990 at the London School of Economics with funding from the Economic and Social Research Council (ESRC) to conduct research on the determinants of economic performance, especially in Britain.

The CEP was awarded a Queen’s Anniversary Prize in 2002. The prize citation described the centre as “widely renowned for its application of economic theory and rigorous empirical analysis to issues of unemployment, productivity, the economics of education and international trade”. It added the CEP had a significant impact on government policy in the UK and abroad and had become Europe’s leading body for the study of globalisation and international trade.

CEP's programme on macroeconomics became a separate part of the newly-founded Centre for Macroeconomics in 2012.

In April 2018, the ESRC acknowledged the centre's sustained strategic value to social science research by awarding it institute status.

== Organisation ==
The Centre for Economic Performance is led by director Stephen Machin alongside research director Henry Overman. Its work is supervised by a policy committee, which comprises 11 members drawn from business, academia and government and is chaired by Nicholas Macpherson (former Permanent Secretary to the Treasury). CEP's research is structured into six research programmes:

- Community (Alan Manning) and Wellbeing (Lord Richard Layard)
- Education and Skills (Sandra McNally)
- Growth (Anna Valero)
- Labour Markets (Guy Michaels)
- Trade (Catherine Thomas)
- Urban (Daniel M. Sturm)

Additionally, CEP researchers are involved in several related centres and projects, e.g. the Centre for Vocational Education Research, The Programme on Innovation and Diffusion and the What Works Centre for Local Economic Growth.

== Publications ==
The Centre publishes academic working papers, briefings and policy analyses. Some of its most notable work includes:

=== Wellbeing ===
The centre's work on wellbeing and mental health, including the LSE Depression Report, led to the introduction of the Improving Access to Psychological Therapies programme, which is widely recognised as the most ambitious programme of talking therapies in the world, treating 1 million people a year. Research from the centre has also fed into the UK government's green book supplementary guidance, which outlines how wellbeing evidence can inform policymaking.

=== Growth and productivity ===
The LSE Growth Commission published two reports in 2013 and 2017: these included recommendations for a National Infrastructure Commission, and a new Infrastructure Bank, both now a reality.

The world management survey (WMS) started in 2002 with the goal of developing a new systematic measure of management practices being used in organisations. The original WMS was an interview-based survey tool with trained interviewers engaging a middle manager in a semi-structured conversation about day-to-day practices at their organisation. Since then, other methods have arisen, including census-style questions sent to establishments and leveraging existing large datasets. The dataset now includes more than 13,000 firms and 4,000 schools and hospitals spanning 35 countries and is open to all. The data provided the first robust evidence on the wide range of management quality across firms and the relationship between management practices and productivity. The focus on management quality has informed the creation of business- and government-led initiatives in the UK, including the Business Basics Programme, Be the Business and Help to Grow.

=== National Minimum Wage ===
The centre played an important role in making the case for the UK’s National Minimum Wage. Research by Alan Manning and colleagues at CEP provided the intellectual context for the policy, advised on its implementation and evaluated its effects. The research included a study which found that the minimum wages set by the UK wages councils (abolished in 1993) had not cost jobs. The Low Pay Commission was established in 1997 by the Labour government to advise on the form and level of a minimum wage, and the National Minimum Wage was introduced in 1999. CEP associate Sir David Metcalf was one of the founding members of the Low Pay Commission, followed later by the current CEP director, Stephen Machin. CEP associate Jonathan Wadsworth is currently a low-pay commissioner.

=== Economic geography ===
Understanding why some places are richer than others is a long-standing focus of CEP research. Tony Venables, a former director of CEP’s globalisation programme, worked with Paul Krugman to develop insights on the role of transport costs in changing regional economic outcomes.

Recently, research led by Stephen Gibbons and Henry Overman has contributed to an understanding of the causes of spatial disparities, in particular, the role of individual’s skills and agglomeration effects. As director of the What Works Centre for Local Economic Growth, Overman has overseen work focused on improving evaluation methods of policies.

=== Brexit ===
Work on the economic effects of Brexit, predicting that creating frictions to trade would lead to a drop in GDP, fed into the Office for Budget Responsibility forecasts. The UK departed from the EU’s single market and customs union at the start of 2021, and trade continued under the Trade and Cooperation Agreement (TCA). CEP work estimates that the new TCA relationship led to a sudden fall in imports, a small, temporary decline in UK exports to the EU but a large drop in the number of export relationships.

== Public lectures ==
The CEP hosts the Lionel Robbins lecture series. Speakers have included Angus Deaton, Paul Krugman, Nicholas Stern, Raj Chetty, Jeffrey Sachs, Raghuram Rajan and Mariana Mazzucato.

== Notable people ==
Those who have served as directors of the CEP include:

- Richard Layard (1990–2003)
- John Van Reenen (2003–2016)
- Stephen Machin (2016–present)

From August 2022, of the current 9 members of the Bank of England Monetary Policy Committee, two are associates of CEP: Jonathan Haskel and Swati Dhingra.

The Migration Advisory Committee is currently chaired by CEP associate Brian Bell and has been previously chaired by CEP associates Alan Manning (2016–2020) and Sir David Metcalf (2007–2016).
