= Suresh Naidu =

American economist

Suresh Naidu is an American economist and academic. He is a named chair professor of economics at Columbia University, as well as a professor international and public affairs. His fields of expertise are development economics, labor economics, and political economy. He has been described by the NYTimes as an economic historian.

Suresh has been cited for his commentary on the work of Thomas Piketty, and for his argument for defining capital as 'a forward looking claim on resources'. He has also commented upon the rise of housing wealth and its implications for political economy.

== Early career ==
Prior to becoming a named chair and Columbia, he was a Harvard Academy Junior Scholar, and was an instructor at UC Berkeley. He completed a Bachelor of Math at the University of Waterloo, an MA in economics at University of Massachusetts Amherst, and a PhD at UC Berkeley.

== Other work ==
Outside of formal academic writing, Naidu has contributed to various publications. He has written for the Boston Review, Jacobin, The Hindu, among other publications.
