= Centre for the Economics of Education =

English think tank

The Centre for the Economics of Education (CEE) was a think tank in London, England, established in March 2000, with an extensive range of publications and reports on the economics of education. It ceased to operate in 2010.

The CEE is a member of the LSE Research Laboratory at the London School of Economics (LSE). It continues the work of the Higher Education Research Unit at the LSE. The CEE receives funding from the British Department for Children, Schools and Families and the Department for Business, Innovation and Skills, both ministerial departments of the British government. Basic research conducted by the CEE shapes British educational policy and is widely cited by both professional and general-interest publications.
