= Edward Miguel =

American economist

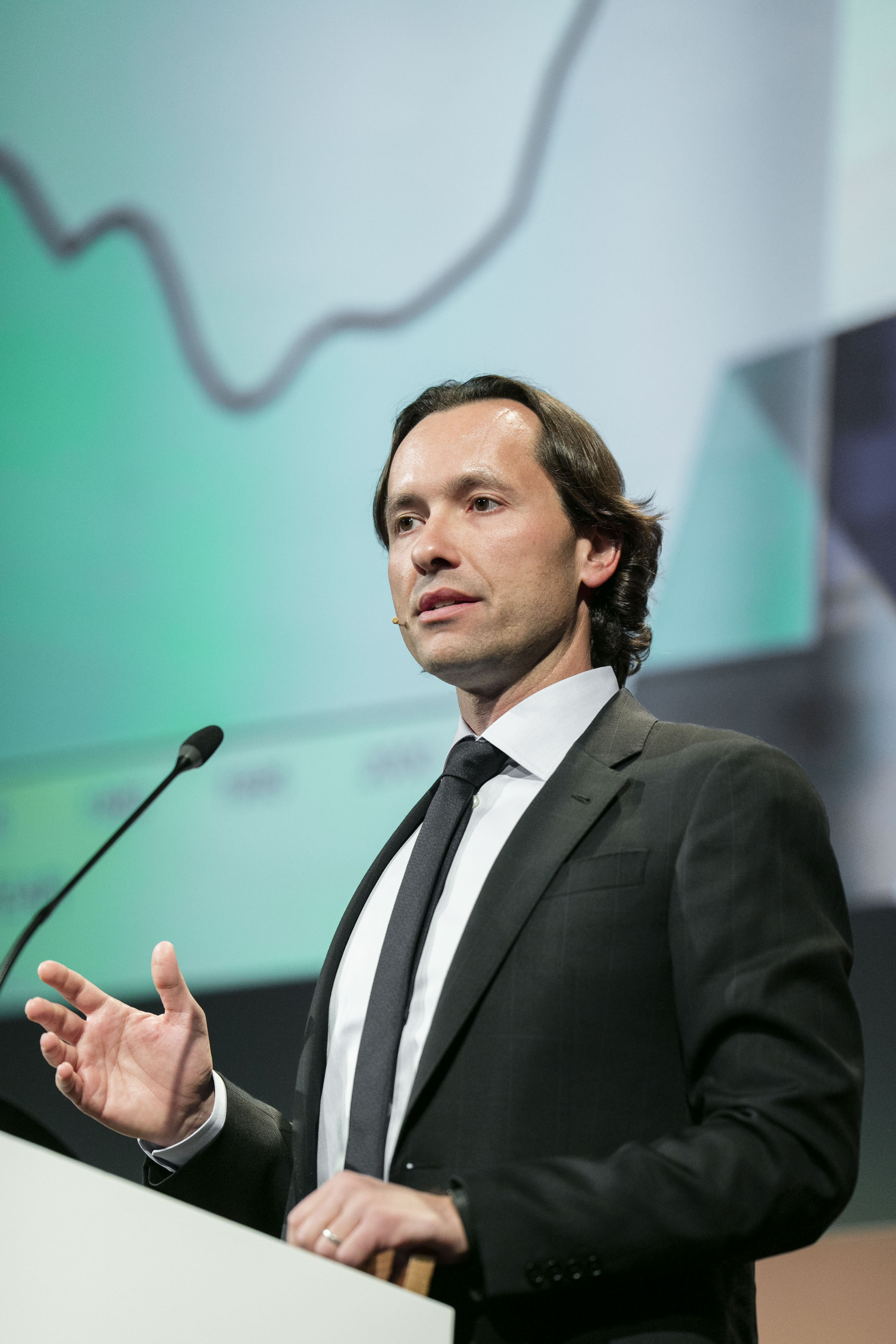
- Miguel in 2015
- Born: Edward Andrew Miguel; 1974 (age 51–52); New York City, NY, U.S.
- Spouse: Alison Reed

Academic background
- Education: Harvard University (MA 1998, PhD 2000) Massachusetts Institute of Technology (SB 1996)
- Doctoral advisor: Michael Kremer • Abhijit Banerjee • Alberto Alesina • Lawrence F. Katz

Academic work
- Discipline: Development economics Environmental economics Health economics Political economy
- Institutions: UC Berkeley (2000–present) NBER (2002–present)
- Doctoral students: Chris Blattman • Manisha Shah • Eva Vivalt • Solomon Hsiang • Suresh Naidu • Gautam Rao • Lauren Falcao Bergquist • Dennis Egger
- Awards: Frisch Medal (2024); Sloan Fellowship (2005-2007)
- Website: Information at IDEAS / RePEc

Edward "Ted" Andrew Miguel (born 1974) is an American development economist currently serving as the Distinguished Professor of Economics and Oxfam Professor of Environmental and Resource Economics at the University of California, Berkeley. He is the founder and faculty co-director of the Center for Effective Global Action (CEGA), a Berkeley-based hub for research on development economics.

Miguel's research focuses on economic development, particularly in Sub-Saharan Africa. He has pursued projects on the causes and consequences of conflict, the effects of early life health and educational interventions, and research transparency in the social sciences. Alongside Abhijit Banerjee, Esther Duflo, Dean Karlan, and Michael Kremer, Miguel has pioneered the use of randomized controlled trials and other forms of impact evaluation to test the effects of social interventions in the developing world. In 2019, the Nobel Memorial Prize in Economic Sciences was awarded to Abhijit Banerjee, Esther Duflo, and Michael Kremer for "their experimental approach to alleviating global poverty", citing Miguel and CEGA as additional actors linking "experimental research to policy change and advice."

Among other honors, Miguel is the recipient of a Sloan Research Fellowship and the 2024 Frisch Medal and is an elected member of the American Academy of Arts and Sciences and the Econometric Society. He is affiliated with the National Bureau of Economic Research and Bureau for Research and Economic Analysis of Development.

== Education ==
Edward Andrew Miguel was born in New York City in 1974, and raised in New Jersey. He is the son of Krystyna Miguel, a nutrionist, and Eduardo Miguel, a rheumatologist. He attended Tenafly High School in Tenafly, New Jersey, graduating as valedictorian of his class in 1992.

After graduating from high school, Miguel attended the Massachusetts Institute of Technology, where he was a Truman Scholar and graduated in 1996 with S.B. degrees in mathematics and economics. Thereafter, he joined Harvard University, receiving a PhD in economics in 2000 with the support of an NSF Graduate Research Fellowship. His thesis, entitled "Political Economy of Education and Health in Kenya", was supervised by Michael Kremer, Abhijit Banerjee, Alberto Alesina, and Lawrence F. Katz, and included an early draft of Kremer and Miguel's evaluation of the Kenya Primary School Deworming Project.

Miguel is the husband of Alison Reed, a pediatric endocrinologist at the University of California, San Francisco, whom he married in 2006.

== Career ==
After finishing his PhD, Miguel joined the faculty of the University of California, Berkeley, where has remained a professor since 2000. Since 2012, he has been the Oxfam Professor of Environmental and Resource Economics; since 2023, he has been the Distinguished Professor of Economics, with joint appointments in UC Berkeley's Department of Economics, Department of Agricultural and Resource Economics, Department of Demography, and Goldman School of Public Policy. Since 2009, he has been a Research Associate of the National Bureau of Economic Research. He is also a member of the American Academy of Arts and Sciences. He was a visiting professor at Stanford University during 2007-2008 and a visiting fellow at Princeton University during 2002–2003.

Miguel is a prolific adviser, and has sat on over 160 dissertation committees while teaching at UC Berkeley. His formers students include economists such as Chris Blattman, Manisha Shah, Eva Vivalt, and Suresh Naidu. In 2015, he was awarded the Carol D. Soc Distinguished Graduate Student Mentoring Award from UC Berkeley for his work mentoring and training PhD students.

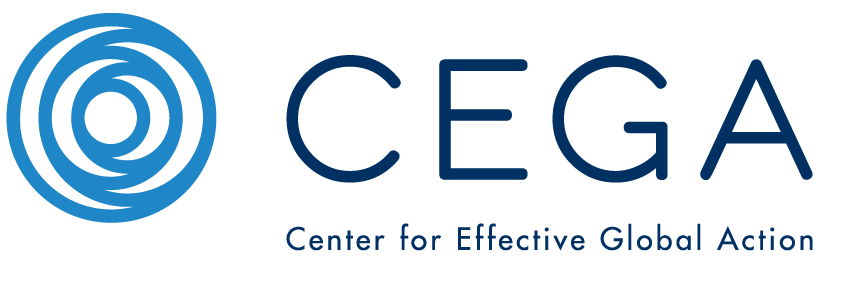
Logo of the Center for Effective Global Action (CEGA)

=== Center for Effective Global Action ===
In 2008, Miguel founded the Center for Effective Global Action (CEGA), a research network and funder based at UC Berkeley that supports research in global health and development focused on impact evaluation. The network currently includes over 190 affiliated faculty at UC Berkeley, Stanford, UCLA, UCSD, and a number of other universities based on the west coast of the United States. CEGA supports research in development economics that leverages randomized controlled trials or other rigorous methods aimed at evaluating the causal effect of interventions on health and well-being in low and middle income countries. Since 2009, the network has distributed over $70 million in competitive grants, and supported over 600 studies across 70 countries.

=== Berkeley Initiative for Transparency in the Social Sciences ===
In 2012, Miguel founded the Berkeley Initiative for Transparency in the Social Sciences (BITSS), an academic initiative within the Center for Effective Global Action aimed at promoting scientific transparency and reproducibility in the social sciences. Alongside organizations such as the Center for Open Science, BITSS creates and disseminates educational resources and tools to promote transparent practices, such as the use of pre-analysis plans, in the social sciences. In 2018, for example, BITSS collaborated with the Journal of Development Economics to launch a pre-results review track in the journal in which authors can apply for publication before results are known in an effort to reduce publication biases and eliminate null result penalties. In line with his work at BITSS, Miguel published a how-to guide entitled Transparent and Reproducible Social Science Research: How to Do Open Science alongside Garrett Christensen and Jeremy Freese. For its work promoting quality in social research, BITSS was awarded an Einstein Foundation Berlin Institutional Award in 2023.

=== Working Group in African Political Economy ===
In 2002, alongside Daniel Posner of UCLA, Miguel co-founded the Working Group in African Political Economy (WGAPE), an organization of economists, political scientists, and graduate students in the social sciences based on the West Coast of the United States conducting field research on the African continent. The group has semi-annually meetings, in which members and invited guests present research in progress. Current and former members of the working group include Miguel, Posner, Chris Blattman, Jenny Aker, and Joshua Graff Zivin.

== Research ==
Miguel's research focuses on development economics and poverty alleviation, particularly in Sub-Saharan Africa. He has pursued research on a range of topics within these fields, including the effects of environmental shocks and extreme weather on conflict and violence, global health, corruption, energy and electrification, the impacts of cash transfers, the economy of aging, and transparency in social science.

=== School-based deworming ===
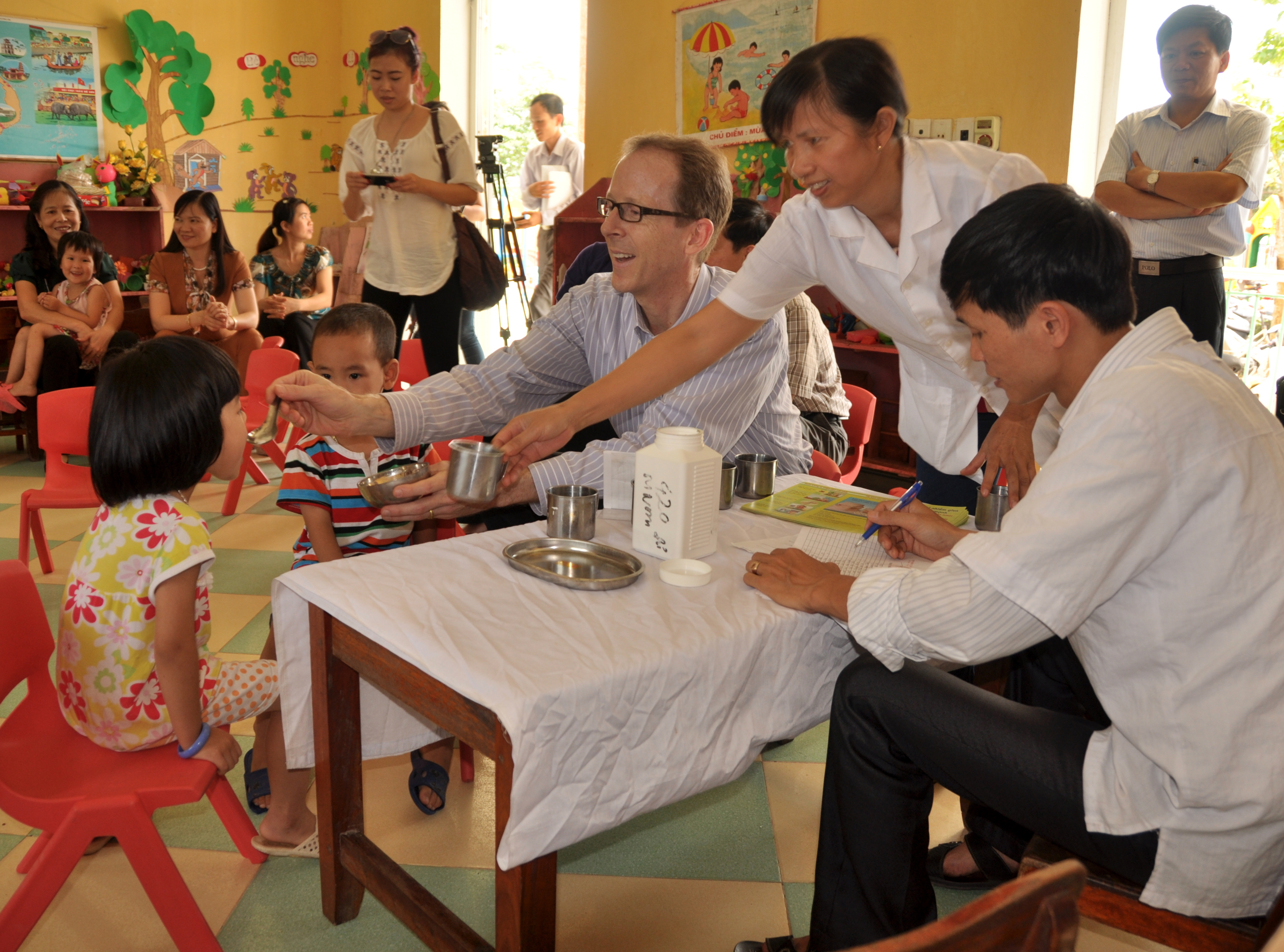
USAID delivering deworming medication to children in Vietnam

Miguel's doctoral thesis was advised by Michael Kremer, an American development economist who later received the 2019 Nobel Memorial Prize in Economic Sciences for his contributions to developing the "experimental approach to alleviating global poverty." Beginning in the late 1990s, Miguel collaborated with Kremer on a randomized controlled trial aimed at evaluating the direct and spillover effects of a school-based deworming program on education and health in rural Kenya. The experiment was inspired by a trip Kremer took to rural Kenya with his wife, Rachel Glennerster, shortly after the completion of his PhD. The randomized controlled trial involved a total of 32,000 children, and found that administering deworming treatments to children reduced rates of school absenteeism by 25%. The study thus estimated that deworming could keep children in school for an additional year at a cost of $3.50 USD, substantially lower than other interventions such as subsidizing school uniforms or constructing additional schools. The results of the study were published in Econometrica in 2004, and inspired the Deworm the World Initiative, an international campaign which has since 2014 delivered 1.8 billion deworming treatments to children around the world. For their work, Miguel and Kremer received the Kenneth Arrow Award from the International Health Economics Association, granted to the best paper in health economics written within the previous year.

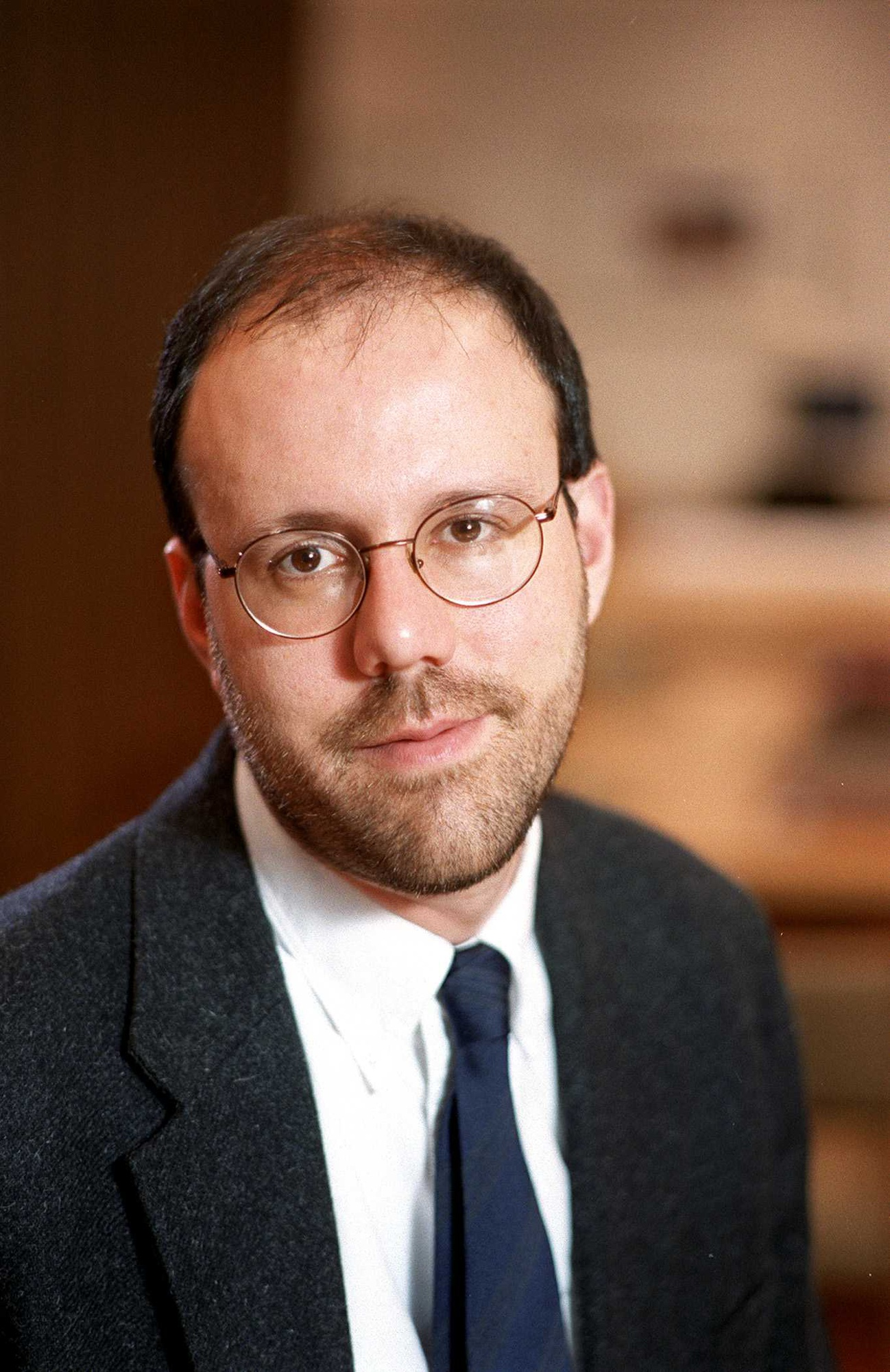
Michael Kremer, co-author of "Worms: Identifying Impacts on Education and Health in the Presence of Treatment Externalities"

Miguel and co-authors have published several long-run follow ups of the original deworming study. In 2020, Miguel released a paper alongside Kremer, Joan Hamory, Michael Walker, and Sarah Baird documenting the long-term effects of the program on earnings, educational attainment, and employment. They find that exposure to additional years of deworming causes a 13% increase in hourly earnings and 14% increase in consumer spending, with large increases as well in the likelihood of working outside agriculture. The effects of the program on earnings were slightly smaller than those observed in a ten-year follow up, but nonetheless suggested the program was highly cost effective, generating a 37% annual rate of return.

In 2013, Miguel and Kremer allowed an independent research team based at the London School of Hygiene & Tropical Medicine to re-evaluate the original dataset and methods used to produce their initial results. The researchers published two re-analyses of Miguel and Kremer's work: a direct replication and a reproduction using alternative statistical methods. They found and documented several errors in the original work, including a substantial amount of missing data and an incorrectly reported claim that school-based deworming reduced anemia in treated children. The results of the replications thus coincided with a Cochrane review on the benefits of deworming, which found little effect on blood hemoglobin levels. The replications did, however, reinforce the original paper's results on school attendance.

Several academics have called into question the results of the replications, suggesting their methods are unnecessarily unfair. Chris Blattman, then of Columbia University, observed that "[t]here are clearly serious problems with the [Kenya] Miguel-Kremer study. But, to be quite frank, you have throw so much crazy sh*t at Miguel-Kremer to make the result go away that I believe the result even more than when I started." Despite mixed evidence, charity evaluator GiveWell continued to recommend funding be allocated to deworming, noting that its low cost would make it highly cost effective if effects do materialize. In response to the debate over the legitimacy of Miguel and Kremer's results, several media outlets and academic publications dubbed the controversy the "worm wars".

=== Climate and weather shocks ===
Miguel has also pursued research alongside Marshall Burke and Solomon Hsiang evaluating the implications of climate change for productivity and conflict across countries. This is one of the earliest studies around this topic. In a paper in Nature, Miguel, Burke, and Hsiang show using data from across countries that productivity is nonlinear in average temperatures, peaking at 13 degrees Celsius and declining rapidly as temperatures rise. Their results suggest that in aggregate, by 2050 climate change may have cost the United States economy $5 trillion.

Alongside Burke, John Dykema, Shanker Satyanath, and David Lobell, Miguel also has an article in the Proceedings of the National Academy of Sciences showing that historically, the risk of armed conflict in a given country in Sub-Saharan Africa in a year is strongly correlated with the presence of extreme temperatures. If historical estimates of the link between battle deaths and temperature are found to persist, they find that standard climate models suggest that the incidence of armed conflict in Sub-Saharan Africa may increase by 54% by 2030, representing an additional 393,000 battle deaths per year.

In addition to this cross-country research, Miguel has also pursued research on the effects of weather shocks on crime and conflict in particular settings. Alongside Halvor Mehlum and Ragnar Torvik, Miguel published an article in the Journal of Urban Economics examining the effects of rising crop prices on property crime in 19th century Bavaria. Using rainfall as a source of random variation in rye yields, they show that grain prices are strongly correlated with rates of property crime, which Bavaria kept meticulous records of. Therefore, they suggest that poverty, hunger, and economic uncertainty may encourage theft. In a similar spirit, Miguel shows in a paper in the Review of Economic Studies that during droughts and floods, elderly women in rural Tanzania are substantially more likely to be murdered by close relatives, in line with beliefs that witchcraft may be responsible for adverse weather.

=== Cash transfers ===
Miguel has also pursued work on the effects of unconditional cash transfers. In 2022, Miguel published the results of a randomized controlled trial examining the direct and general equilibrium effects of unconditional cash transfers on village economies in rural Kenya. The experiment was implemented by GiveDirectly, an international NGO, and involved the distribution of over $10 million USD in lump-sum transfers to over 10,000 poor households in Siaya County. The project was distinguished for evaluating not just the direct effects of cash transfers on recipient households, but also their indirect effects on non-recipient households residing in the same villages. It found that cash transfers have substantial indirect effects on village economies: every $1 USD of cash received by a local economy was associated with a $2.60 USD increase in total economy activity, implying a fiscal multiplier of 2.6.

Logo of GiveDirectly, an international nonprofit

Miguel published the results of the GiveDirectly evaluation in Econometrica, alongside co-authors Paul Niehaus, Michael Walker, Dennis Egger, and Johannes Haushofer. The paper received the 2024 Frisch Medal, awarded every two years to the best empirical or theoretical article published in the journal within the past five years. Miguel is actively involved in further research on the effects of the cash transfer program, including evaluations of its effects on child mortality.

=== Corruption ===
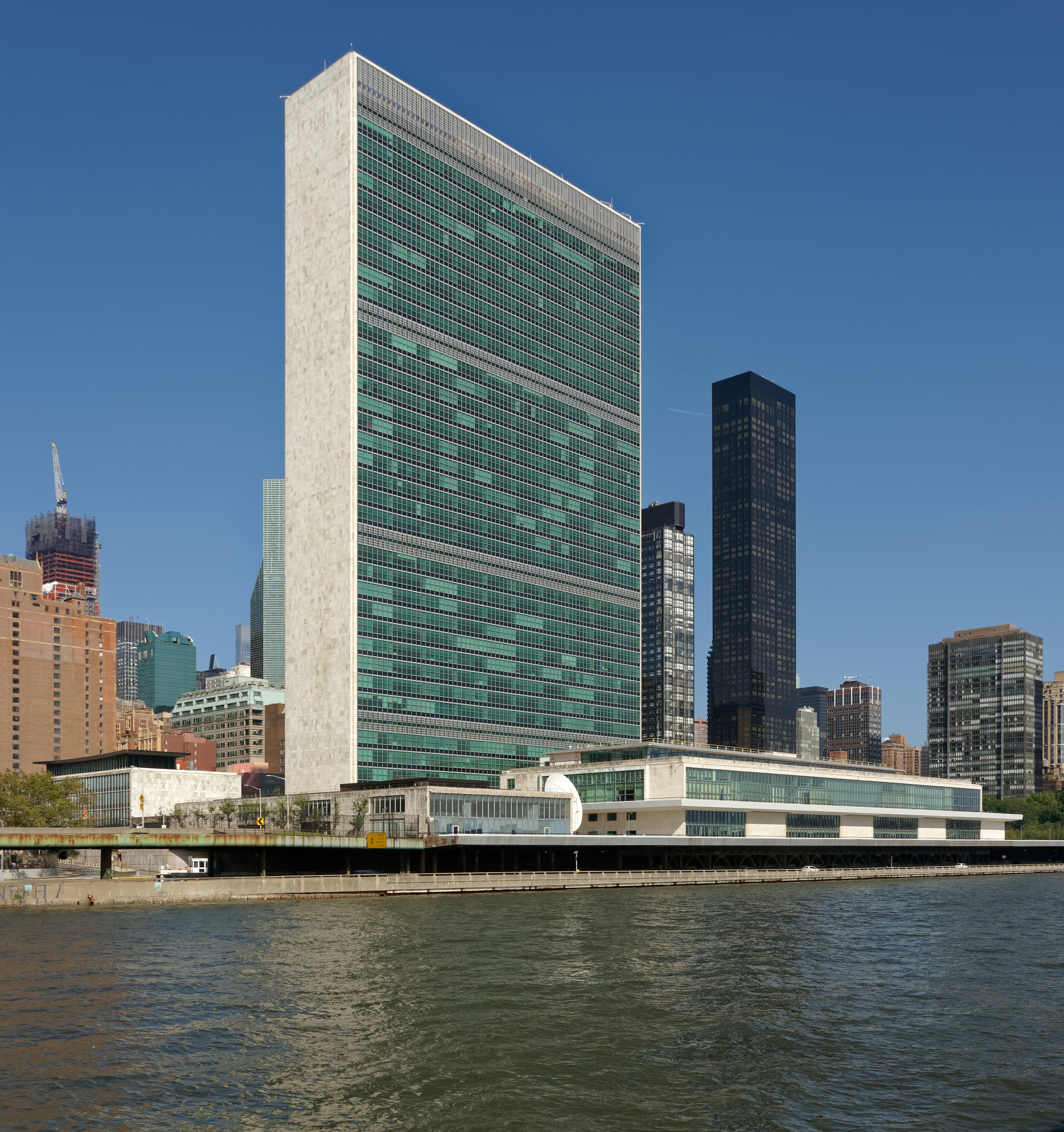
Headquarters of the United Nations in New York City

Miguel has also pursued research on corruption in low and middle income countries. Prior to 2002, United Nations diplomats based in New York City were essentially immune from parking violations, with vehicles ticketed but rarely towed. This changed in 2002, when Senators Hillary Clinton and Chuck Schumer of New York sponsored an amendment to a foreign aid bill allowing New York City to recoup unpaid parking tickets from disbursements of foreign aid to select countries. In a 2006 paper with Raymond Fisman, then of Columbia University, Miguel evaluated the distribution of parking tickets across countries in an effort to shed light on the relative importance of norms and legal enforcement in shaping anti-social behavior and lawfulness. Fisman and Miguel found a strong correlation between third-party measures of political corruption and the number of parking tickets accumulated by a country. Diplomats from Sweden, Canada, and Japan had few if any parking violations, while countries such as Kuwait, Egypt, and Sudan accumulated many. To summarize this and other work, Miguel and Fisman wrote Economic Gangsters: Corruption, Violence and the Poverty of Nations, a popular science book examining the effects of corruption and violence on economic development published by Princeton University Press. In it, they argue for automatically indexing foreign aid to climate shocks in an effort to prevent civil wars or other outbreaks of violence.

== Recognition ==
Miguel is among the most productive economists in the world, ranking in the top 250 according to Research Papers in Economics by total publication output. Several of Miguel's papers fall within the top 1% of economics publications by total accrued citations.

In 2019, the Nobel Memorial Prize in Economic Sciences was awarded to Esther Duflo, Abhijit Banerjee, and Michael Kremer, Miguel's doctoral supervisor and co-author, for "their experimental approach to alleviating global poverty." The official scientific background for the award cited Miguel and CEGA as key additional actors linking "experimental research to policy change and advice." In recognition of his work with Kremer, Miguel attended the Nobel Prize award ceremony in Stockholm.

=== Other awards ===
- The Econometric Society (2025), Elected Member (2025)
- Frisch Medal (2024), awarded to the best paper published in Econometrica in the last four calendar years
- American Academy of Arts and Sciences, Elected Member (2020)
- Carol D. Soc Distinguished Graduate Student Mentoring Award (2015)
- Chancellor's Award for Public Service for Research in the Public Interest (2014)
- UC Berkeley Distinguished Teaching Award (2012)
- Kiel Institute for the World Economy Excellence Award in Global Economic Affairs (2010)
- Kenneth J. Arrow Award (2005), awarded by the International Health Economics Association for the best paper in health economics
- Sloan Research Fellowship (2005)
- Harry S. Truman Scholarship (1995)

== Selected publications ==
=== Books ===
- Miguel, Edward (March 13, 2009). Africa's Turn?. MIT Press. ISBN 978-0-262-01289-8.
- Fisman, Raymond; Miguel, Edward (January 24, 2010). Economic Gangsters: Corruption, Violence, and the Poverty of Nations. Princeton University Press. ISBN 978-0-691-14469-6.
- Christensen, Garret; Freese, Jeremy; Miguel, Edward (July 23, 2019). Transparent and Reproducible Social Science Research: How to Do Open Science. University of California Press. ISBN 978-0-520-29695-4.

=== Journal articles ===
==== Global public health ====
- Miguel, Edward; Kremer, Michael (December 10, 2003). "Worms: Identifying Impacts on Education and Health in the Presence of Treatment Externalities". Econometrica. 72 (1): 159–217. doi:10.1111/j.1468-0262.2004.00481.x.
- Hamory, Joan; Miguel, Edward; Walker, Michael; Kremer, Michael; Baird, Sarah (March 31, 2021). "Twenty-year economic impacts of deworming". Proceedings of the National Academy of Sciences. 118 (14) e2023185118. Bibcode:2021PNAS..11823185H. doi:10.1073/pnas.2023185118. PMC 8040658. PMID 33790017.

==== Scientific transparency ====
- Miguel, Edward; Camerer, Colin; Casey, Katherine; et al. (January 3, 2014). "Promoting transparency in social science research". Science. 343 (6166): 30–31. Bibcode:2014Sci...343...30M. doi:10.1126/science.1245317. PMC 4103621. PMID 24385620.
- Miguel, Edward (2021). "Evidence on Research Transparency in Economics". Journal of Economic Perspectives. 35 (3): 193–214. doi:10.1257/jep.35.3.193.

==== Climate and environmental stress ====
- Hsiang, Solomon; Burke, Marshall; Miguel, Edward (2013). "Quantifying the Influence of Climate on Human Conflict". Science. 341 (6151). doi:10.1126/science.1235367.
- Burke, Marshall; Hsiang, Solomon; Miguel, Edward (2015). "Global non-linear effect of temperature on economic production". Nature. 527: 235–239. doi:10.1038/nature15725.

==== Civil conflict ====
- Miguel, Edward; Satyanath, Shanker; Sergenti, Ernest (2004). "Economic Shocks and Civil Conflict: An Instrumental Variables Approach". Journal of Political Economy. 112 (4): 725–753. doi:10.1086/421174.
- Blattman, Christopher; Miguel, Edward (2010). "Civil War". Journal of Economic Literature. 48 (1): 3–57. doi:10.1257/jel.48.1.3.
