= Einstein Foundation Berlin =

German foundation

- Formation: 2009; 17 years ago
- Type: Foundation
- Headquarters: Jägerstraße 22/23; Berlin, Germany
- Managing Director: Dr. Thorsten Wilhelmy
- Website: www.einsteinfoundation.de

The Einstein Foundation Berlin is a foundation based in Berlin, Germany "that aims to promote science and research of top international caliber in Berlin and to establish the city as a centre of scientific excellence." It does this through various objectives, including the cross-institutional promotion of Berlin research projects, the appointment of outstanding scientists to Berlin, targeted support for young researchers, and better cooperation between university, non-university, and private sector institutions.

The foundation supports research in many fields beyond science, including linguistics, archeology, and political science. It gives out annual awards and sponsors various projects, including the "Einstein Center of Catalysis".

The Einstein Foundation Berlin is separate from the short-lived Albert Einstein Foundation for Higher Learning, Inc., founded in 1946.

== History ==
The Einstein Foundation was established by the city and state of Berlin in 2009.

== Activities ==
=== Science communication ===
In addition to the direct funding of research projects and scientists, one of the foundation's key tasks is science communication. The Foundation's science podcast, #AskDifferent, has been on air since 2020, making people and fields of work that are particularly associated with the foundation known to a broad public. The journal ALBERT, published since 2015, also focuses on research areas that reflect the diversity and complexity of Berlin's scientific landscape.

As part of science communication, the Einstein Foundation Berlin also acts as an organizer. It organizes the public event series "Meeting Einstein" and "Einstein in the Dome" in cooperation with the Planetarium Berlin.

=== Financial support ===
Einstein Foundation Berlin provides institutional support to the Free University of Berlin, the Humboldt University of Berlin, the Technische Universität Berlin, and the Berlin University of the Arts, as well as Charité—– Universitätsmedizin Berlin. Publicly funded research institutions in Berlin can be supported as cooperation partners of the eligible institutions, including institutes of the Fraunhofer Society, the Helmholtz Association, the Leibniz Association, and the Max Planck Society. The Hebrew University of Jerusalem is also considered a cooperation partner because it preserves the legacy of Albert Einstein and participates in committees.

The Foundation offers funding programs for various career levels, including professorships, visiting fellows, and so-called starting researchers. Furthermore, in 2023 the Einstein Foundation Berlin supported 19 foreign scientists as part of the program to promote academic freedom for those experiencing restrictions on their academic freedom in their home countries or are otherwise at risk.

=== Cooperation with the Berlin University Alliance ===
The cooperation between the Einstein Foundation Berlin and the Berlin University Alliance (BUA) has resulted in programs such as the Einstein BUA/Oxford Visiting Fellow program. This enables visiting researchers from the University of Oxford to get involved in Berlin research networks. In addition, the Einstein BUA profile professorship strengthens the BUA's competencies in the defined Grand Challenges by appointing professors. The Einstein Foundation's funding of Einstein Research Units also supports the work on scientifically and socially relevant topics within the Grand Challenges.

== Einstein Foundation Award ==
In 2021, the Einstein Foundation launched the Einstein Foundation Award for Promoting Quality in Research. Since then, the foundation has annually honored contributions that increase the validity of research and science, thereby promoting their social benefit. Examples of award-worthy activities include enabling free access to research worldwide (Open science), establishing equal international cooperation ("Big Team Science"), and commitment to high ethical standards.

The prize, worth a total of 500,000 euros, is awarded by the Einstein Foundation Berlin together with the QUEST Center for Responsible Research at the Berlin Institute of Health in the Charité (BIH) in three categories: The "Individual Award" honors researchers or small research groups with 200,000 euros each, and the "Institutional Award" honors organizations and scientific institutions. The "Early Career Award" honors innovative ideas from scientists at the beginning of their careers with 100,000 euros.

The Einstein Foundation Award is financed by the Damp Foundation over a period of ten years and is additionally supported by the State of Berlin. The publishers Nature Portfolio and Public Library of Science (PLOS), as well as the Max Planck Foundation and the Berlin University Alliance, support the Einstein Foundation Berlin in the international establishment and implementation of the award.

=== Einstein Foundation Award winners ===
- 2021:
  - Individual Award — Paul Ginsparg
  - Institutional Award — Center for Open Science
  - Early Career Award — ManyBabies 5
- 2022:
  - Individual Award — Gordon Guyatt
  - Institutional Award — Psychological Science Accelerator
  - Early Career Award — Ape Research Index
- 2023:
  - Individual Award — Yves Moreau
  - Institutional Award — Berkeley Initiative for Transparency in the Social Sciences
  - Early Career Award — Responsible Research Assessment/Anne Gärtner

== Funding ==
Einstein Foundation Berlin is funded by state monies and private support: the Damp Foundation and the Wübben Science Foundation have pledged to support the Foundation with a total of €31 million until 2031. In addition, the Foundation receives matching funds from the state of Berlin in the amount of 50 cents for every privately generated Euro.

== Board members ==
The Foundation is headed by a board of directors:

- Edelgard Bulmahn, advisory board
- Martin Grötschel, executive board (chair 2011–2015)
- Christine Hohmann-Dennhardt, board of trustees
- Amélie Mummendey, chair of the board of trustees
- Stefan Rinke, advisory board
- Johanna Wanka, advisory board
- Günter M. Ziegler, foundation council

== Notable grant and other support recipients ==
=== Individuals/research fellows ===
- Cecilia Clementi — chemist
- Channing Der — microbiologist
- Eduard Feireisl — mathematician
- Katharina Galor — art historian and archeologist
- Adele Goldberg — linguist (2010–2014)
- David H. Gutmann — neurologist (2017–2022)
- Stefan Hecht — chemist
- Brian Kobilka – chemist (winner of the Nobel Prize in Chemistry)
- Yannís G. Kevrekidis — chemist (2016–2018)
- Edvard Moser – neuroscientist (winner of the Nobel Prize in Physiology or Medicine)
- Juri Rappsilber — chemist
- Stefan Rinke — historian (2013–2015)
- Richard J. Samuels — political scientist
- Surjo R. Soekadar — physician, neuroscientist, and development aid worker (2018)
- Thomas C. Südhof – biochemist (winner of the Nobel Prize in Physiology or Medicine)
- Viola Vogel — biophysicist

=== Programs and institutions ===
- Berlin Graduate School for Transnational Studies
- BIG-NSE (Berlin International Graduate School of Natural Sciences and Engineering)
- PathoGraphics Research Group, Free University of Berlin, 2016–2019

== See also ==
- Albert Einstein Society
- Free University of Berlin
- Hebrew University of Jerusalem
- Technische Universität Berlin
