= Lisa Cameron (economist) =

Australian economist

Lisa Cameron FASSA (born 27 January 1967) is an Australian economist currently working as a Professional Research Fellow at the Melbourne Institute of Applied Economic and Social Research at the University of Melbourne.

== Biography ==
Lisa Cameron earned her Bachelor of Commerce at the University of Melbourne in 1989, where she graduated with first class honours. This was followed by completing a Masters of Commerce degree in 1992, as well as a Graduate Diploma in Indonesian Modern Language in 1999. Thereafter, Cameron completed a M.A. and subsequently proceeded to complete a PhD in economics at Princeton University. While at Princeton, she received the Bradley Fellowship award and scholarship from the Department of Economics, the Robertson Fellow award at the Woodrow Wilson School, and the Mellon Grant for research in Indonesia, aligning with her research projects. After her graduation in 1996, she continued in an academic and research capacity at the University of Melbourne for 13 years, being promoted to Director of the Asian Economics Centre in 2007 and becoming a Professor for the Department of Economics in 2010. In order to pursue greater involvement in the developmental economics space, Cameron moved to Monash University in 2010, where she acted as the Director for the Centre for Development Economics (CDE) and as a Professor in the Department of Econometrics and Business Statistics. Since 2017, her current role at the Melbourne Institute has allowed her to concentrate on socio-economic research matters in developing countries of interest.

In addition to her academic position, Cameron maintains affiliations with Abdul Latif Jameel Poverty Action Lab (J-PAL) in Boston, while actively contributing publications for the IZA Institute of Labor Economics in Germany, joining as a Research Fellow in February 2012. In 2014, she was also elected as a Fellow of the Australian Academy of Social Sciences. Cameron has extensive experience working with international development organizations and global agencies, such as the World Bank and the Department of Foreign Affairs and Trade (Australia).

== Research and published literature ==
Cameron's research interests include labour economics, health economics, and developmental economics, specifically in developing nations within Asia (with core countries of focus being Indonesia and China). In most of her research she takes an empirical microeconomics lens, often applying techniques of experimental economics to better understand and gain insights on socio-economic and policy-related issues. While at the World Bank, Cameron focused her earlier efforts in 2004 by preparing a brief on gender inequality for the Indonesian government and a developing research program for the Bank that centered around similar issues. Most recently, she took on Principal Investigator Roles on the evaluation of Indonesian sanitation interventions and child and maternal health trends. Her involvement in DAFTA follows a similar pattern of research, most notably with research projects in disability, gender inequality, and maternal mortality.

=== Research on developmental economics ===
With a large focus on the welfare of disadvantaged and marginalized groups and a particular focus around sanitation systems in developing communities, Cameron has published extensive work and forthcoming publications in areas within developmental economics. Cameron's work with Diana Conteras Suarez in evaluating conditional cash transfer (CCT) programs includes new considerations around the role of consumer choice and individual preferences on the likelihood of household participation in these programs, and whether there is evidence of greater aspirations for higher-level education for their children. Through a study conducted in Colombia, Cameron concludes that despite CCT programs driving marginal increases in human capital, the association is primarily due to the rise in disposable income that allows for a greater propensity to invest in schooling. In reality, these transfer programs had no impact on the participants' time preferences, where parents actually assigned a lower probability to their children completing higher levels of education with their involvement in these programs. This suggests a potential risk of over-dependency on money transfers as the children becoming increasingly educated.

==== Indonesia ====
Studying the impacts of widely-used community-led total sanitation programs in rural Indonesia with Susan Olivia and Manisha Shah, Cameron concludes that while the initiative resulted in a scaled roll-out across the country and contributed to increases in proper sanitation infrastructure and lowered acceptance rates of open defecation among citizens, there was no evidence of direct impact on children with respect to mitigating anemia and other functional characteristics. The household data collected from randomized trials suggests that while local governments are becoming more proactive in supporting development projects for water, sanitation, and hygiene (WASH), there exists several barriers in enabling systematic changes within Indonesian communities, including varying levels of social and economic capital, levels of poverty, and the willingness of local governments to offer educational support regarding sanitation to citizens. However, local governments were found to lag behind World Bank contractors in terms of their effectiveness in implementing these solutions. Relatedly, in another exploration of the impacts of open defecation on economic growth and development, Cameron, Shah, and Paul Gertler find a negative linear correlation between open defecation rates in villages and the average heights of children (leading to increases of up to 0.44 standard deviations), but only in the case where open defecation was completely eliminated from the environment. The authors also suggest that health promotions and educational campaigns incentivizing individuals to install sanitation facilities were less effective in driving adoption compared to offering subsidies for installation.

Cameron's work on health economics extends to an exploration on the "double burden" of malnutrition in broader South East Asia, where both under-nutrition and over-nutrition run rampant and contribute to systemic health problems within the countries in the Pacific. By adapting the UNICEF framework for malnutrition determinants and the Lancet series' recent obesity framework and examining vulnerabilities in children through body mass index comparisons, she concludes that almost 50% of the global double burden of malnutrition exists in South East Asia and the Pacific alone, holding the fastest increase in female overweight rates in the past 30 years. Based on these findings, a number of policy-based opportunities are identified in order to mitigate the health risks in the South East Asian regions, including commission new research, pushing for private sector involvement, and emphasizing the regional monitoring of nutritional outcomes.

==== China ====
In her most recent publication, Cameron examines the relationship between rising crime rates in China and the marriage market, specifically by looking at the sex ratio and other behavioural drivers of criminality in certain districts within the country. Through collecting survey and experimental data on prison inmates and compatible non-inmates (migrants) in Shenzhen, Cameron finds through regression analysis that the propensity to commit crimes in China is positively associated with the high prevailing sex ratios (marriageable age from 18-27) through two factors. She argues that based on this cohort analysis, criminality is mostly driven by the behaviour of unmarried men through mechanisms in the marriage market. In this case, given high sex ratio environments within Shenzhen, there is increased competition on the marriage markets, putting pressure on men to appear more financiallyattractive and thus incentivizing these unmarried men to commit higher-value, riskier crimes in order to achieve their goals.

=== Research on policy topics and women in the economy ===
The second key area of Cameron's economic contributions are specifically around policy considerations, stemming directly from her extensive experience at the World Bank and DAFTA. In a key publication on social protection for women in developing nations updated in February 2019, Cameron asserts that there are large barriers to accessibility for women looking for social protection schemes, and that optimizing the delivery and uptake of these initiatives requires a concerted effort to design programs that can be scaled up to reach a large number of women. Empirically, she finds that while employment guarantee schemes, pension schemes, microfinance, and conditional cash transfer programs can all be useful in closing the gap in earnings and sustained work, they are often not tailored to specific groups of women and thus fail to adequately protect women. These necessary accommodations can be filled jointly by governments and the efforts of non-governmental organizations to account for the individual differences in women's everyday lives.

==== Indonesia ====
Cameron's current and existing research within economic policy in Indonesia spans a broad range of topics, including gender inequality in Indonesian labour markets from a government policy perspective, the impacts of criminalization of sex work, determinants of maternal mortality, and female labour force participation rates in Indonesia. As seen in the research topics, Cameron's work has been increasingly focused on women in the developing economies. Through her policy analysis, she finds that the Indonesian female labour participation rate has stayed for two decades at a constant 51%, primarily due to supply-side drivers. Marital status was found to be a key factor in determining the degree of labour force participation in Indonesia, where a married woman in a rural area is 11% less likely to be working or looking for work. This is compared to urban areas where married women are 24% less likely to be in the workforce relative to single women, with both of these statistics driven further by the level of educational attainment. Using an economic growth model, she forecasts that Indonesia would need to increase its female labour force participation rate to 58.5% to contribute the G20's overall goal of decrease the female-male participation gap to 25% by 2025, which is noted to be unlikely given the current state labour market conditions.

Extending the work on labour force participation further, Cameron has conducted a general study of gender inequality in Indonesia that builds on previous research and literature from the Global Gender Gap Report in 2014, providing new insights specifically in the East Asian region. This includes the extent of the gender-wage gap totalling 41%, suggesting large levels of wage discrimination against women with only a small proportion of this explainable by differences in productive characteristics. Additionally, she notes that the phenomenon of "sticky floors", where women in lower-paid and lower-skilled jobs face more difficulties compared to women at the top of the spectrum, compounds with industrial segregation by occupation and contributes greatly to this disparity. Cameron notes that future priorities and initiatives to mitigate effects of the wage gap should be closely tied to entry and re-entry decisions into the labour market at the individual level.

In collaboration with the Australian-Indonesian Partnership for Economic Governance and the Australian Department of Foreign Affairs and Trade and the work of Diana Contreras-Suarez, Cameron provides a policy-based view of disability in Indonesia and its impacts on economic development and welfare. In the research, she notes that the main drivers of disabilities are through diseases and accidents, with the average years of education only being 2.8 to 4.4 years compared to 6.5 years for individuals with no disabilities. This problem is further exacerbated by the fact that the majority of individuals with disabilities do not use assistive devices to help mitigate their health and personal issues. Cameron suggests that there is a huge opportunity to collect higher quality data to inform and build adequate policy mechanisms.

==== China ====
In 2018 Cameron was one of the authors of "Effects of China's One Child Policy on its children". The paper analysed the effect of China's one-child policy using 400 subjects and it was reported that China's policy had created a generation of children who lacked social and economic qualities that were important for success. Her co-authors were Nisvan Erkal of Melbourne University and Lata Gangadharan from Monash University and Xin Meng from the Australian National University. The research analyses the impact of population and economic growth, specifically with potential impacts of gender imbalances and cultural preferences in terms of child bearing. They note that the overall economic impact of the One-Child policy is extremely difficult to determine, with conflicting effects such as a heavier productivity burden on younger generations but with associated stimulations in the country's net savings rate. Due to many Chinese households preferring a son in the child birth, the increasing ratio between the number of men to women has led to many men being unable to find a partner. With the current day policy being looser in requirements, Cameron asserts that although there is now more possibility for greater fertility rates, the majority of urban women are likely to delay childbirth in favour of higher-level education (with no impact on rural Chinese households who were not restricted by the original One-Child policy).

=== Research on other topics in economics ===
Other topics of Cameron's research include experimental economics examinations of risk-taking within natural disaster contexts, institutional corruption, the complements and substitutes discussion for cannabis, alcohol, and cigarettes, and the considerations in the cultural integration of immigrants.

- With an experimental risk analysis conducted within the South East Asia regions most prone to natural disasters, the key finding is that individuals who recently suffered a flood or earthquake behave with more risk-aversion, due to attributing a higher probability of experiencing another natural disaster in the future.
- Defining culture as "an individual's accumulated experience, shaped by the social, institutional, and economic aspects", Cameron finds that there is greater variation in the propensities to punish corrupt behaviour in select countries such as Indonesia, Singapore, India, and Australia, relative to engaging in similar behaviour.
- Applying individual data from the National Drug Strategy Household Surveys, Cameron argues that there is some analytical evidence from own-price effects and cross-price elasticities to suggest that cannabis is a substitute product to alcohol (with alcohol and cigarettes being complementary goods), with increases in usage in older individuals due to liberalization of cannabis laws in South Australia.
- By performing laboratory experiments and examining the cultural integration patterns of Chinese individuals living in Australia, Cameron claims that the greater the proportion of education received in "Western standards", the greater the negative impact on behavioural characteristics such as altruism and trust, while adhering less to norms of their original Eastern heritage.

== Selected bibliography ==
- Cameron, Lisa; Meng, Xin; Zhang, Dandan (February 2019). "China's Sex Ratio and Crime: Behavioural Change or Financial Necessity?". The Economic Journal. 129 (618): 790–820. doi:10.1111/ecoj.12561. hdl:11343/214144.
- Cameron, L.; Erkal, N.; Gangadharan, L.; Meng, X. (22 February 2013). "Little Emperors: Behavioral Impacts of China's One-Child Policy". Science. 339 (6122): 953–957. doi:10.1126/science.1230221. PMID 23306438. S2CID 16152768.
- Cameron, Lisa; Shah, Manisha (2015). "Risk-Taking Behavior in the Wake of Natural Disasters" (PDF). Journal of Human Resources. 50 (2): 484–515. doi:10.3368/jhr.50.2.484. S2CID 845418. Project MUSE 581183.
- Cameron, Lisa; Chaudhuri, Ananish; Erkal, Nisvan; Gangadharan, Lata (August 2009). "Propensities to engage in and punish corrupt behavior: Experimental evidence from Australia, India, Indonesia and Singapore". Journal of Public Economics. 93 (7–8): 843–851. doi:10.1016/j.jpubeco.2009.03.004.
- Cameron, Lisa; Olivia, Susan; Shah, Manisha (May 2019). "Scaling up sanitation: Evidence from an RCT in Indonesia". Journal of Development Economics. 138: 1–16. doi:10.1016/j.jdeveco.2018.12.001. PMC 6472610. PMID 31057208.
- Cameron, Lisa; Williams, Jenny (March 2001). "Cannabis, Alcohol and Cigarettes: Substitutes or Complements?". Economic Record. 77 (236): 19–34. doi:10.1111/1475-4932.00002.
- Cameron, Lisa; Erkal, Nisvan; Gangadharan, Lata; Zhang, Marina (March 2015). "Cultural integration: Experimental evidence of convergence in immigrants' preferences". Journal of Economic Behavior & Organization. 111: 38–58. doi:10.1016/j.jebo.2014.11.012.
- Contreras Suarez, Diana; Cameron, Lisa A. (2016). "Conditional Cash Transfers: Do They Change Time Preferences and Educational Aspirations?". doi:10.2139/ssrn.2854883. hdl:11343/227137. SSRN 2854883.
- Gertler, Paul; Shah, Manisha; Alzua, Maria Laura; Cameron, Lisa; Martinez, Sebastian; Patil, Sumeet (March 2015). "How Does Health Promotion Work? Evidence From The Dirty Business of Eliminating Open Defecation". doi:10.3386/w20997. hdl:11336/13644. S2CID 70529206.
- Haddad, Lawrence; Cameron, Lisa; Barnett, Inka (November 2015). "The double burden of malnutrition in SE Asia and the Pacific: priorities, policies and politics". Health Policy and Planning. 30 (9): 1193–1206. doi:10.1093/heapol/czu110. PMID 25324529.
