= Fisman =

Fisman is a surname. Notable people with the surname include:

- Dana Fisman, Israeli computer scientist
- David Fisman, Canadian epidemiologist
- Raymond Fisman (born 1971), American economist

== See also ==
- Fishman (disambiguation)
