= Manish Shah =

Manish Shah may refer to:

- Manish S. Shah (born 1972), a United States district judge
- Manish Shah (doctor), a former general practitioner in east London convicted of multiple sexual assaults

== See also ==
- Manisha Shah, an American economist
