= Nisvan Erkal =

Economist with Turkish Australian nationality

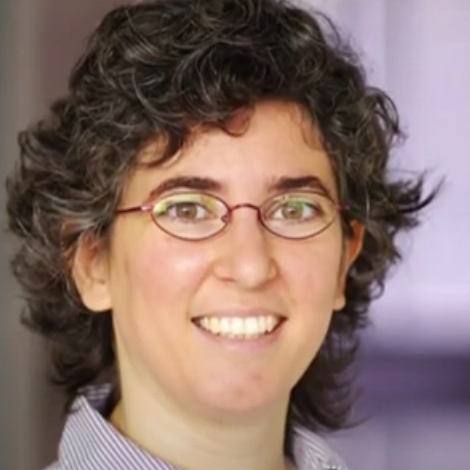
- Occupation: Professor
- Employer: University of Melbourne

Nisvan Erkal FASSA is an economist of Turkish-Australian nationality. She is a professor of economics at the University of Melbourne and she is a fellow of the Academy of the Social Sciences in Australia. Erkal has studied a range of subjects including the effect of policies like China's One Child Policy and how the use of information and traditional methods of choosing leaders can result in discrimination against women.

== Life ==
Erkal completed her first degree at Macalester College in Minnesota. She went on to gain a master's and a doctorate degree at the University of Maryland.

In 2007 Erkal published Optimal Sharing Strategies in Dynamic Games of Research and Development with Deborah Minehart of the United States Department of Justice.

In 2018 Erkal was one of the authors of the paper "Effects of China's One Child Policy on its children". They analysed the effect of China's one-child policy using 400 subjects, and their conclusion was that it had created a generation of children who lacked social and economic qualities that were important for success. Her co-authors were Lisa Cameron and Lata Gangadharan from Monash University and Xin Meng from the Australian National University.

Erkal is known for investigating how the use of information and traditional methods of choosing leaders can result in discrimination against women. In 2019 she was the lead author of a paper that proposed a policy that would encourage more women into leadership roles. The paper noted that the current method of finding people to fulfil leadership roles was for candidates to "opt-in" to show their interest. The paper proposed that women were willing to lead but they did not like to compete. The paper proposed that candidates should be chosen after an opt-out process to determine candidates for a new position.

During the COVID-19 pandemic in Australia, Erkal was one of 265 economists who wrote an open letter to encourage the government to prioritise health before the economy.

Erkal was elected to be a fellow of the Academy of the Social Sciences in Australia together with 36 others including David Kalisch, Catharine Coleborne and Lyn Parker in 2021. She was appointed a member of the 2024 ARC College of Experts.
