= Catharine Coleborne =

Medical historian and academic administrator

Catharine Coleborne FASSA FAHA FRSN
- Occupation: academic
- Employer: University of Newcastle
- Known for: studying madness

Catharine Coleborne is an Australian medical historian and academic administrator. She was the Head of School and Dean of Arts at the University of Newcastle (2015 to 2022) and is a fellow of the Academy of the Social Sciences in Australia, the Australian Academy of the Humanities and the Royal Society of New South Wales.

== Life ==
Coleborne took her first degree at the University of Melbourne before going on to study "Madness" to gain a doctorate from La Trobe University in Melbourne. She looked at gender and institutional confinement for the mentally ill during the nineteenth-century when Australia was part of the British Empire.

Coleborne has continued to study madness and she has published books and papers on her research.

She has published four books as sole author including Madness in the Family: Insanity and Institutions in the Australasian Colonial World, 1860–1914 in 2009 when she was an Associate Professor at Waikato University.

In 2015 she became the Head of School and Dean of Arts, University of Newcastle. She was elected to be a fellow of the Academy of the Social Sciences in Australia in 2021 together with 36 others including David Kalisch, Nisvan Erkal and Lyn Parker in 2021 In that year she was also the President of the Australasian Council of Deans of Arts and Social Sciences (DASSH) and she was a keynote speaker at the National Association of Graduate Careers Advisory Services National Conference.

Coleborne was awarded a research fellowship by the National Library of Australia in 2025.

== Selected publications ==
=== Books ===
- Madness in the Family: Insanity and Institutions in the Australasian Colonial World, 1860–1914
- Coleborne, Catharine; MacKinnon, Dolly (2011). Exhibiting madness in museums: remembering psychiatry through collections and display. Routledge research in museum studies. New York: Routledge. ISBN 978-0-203-80710-1.
- Coleborne, Catharine (1 October 2015). Insanity, Identity and Empire. Manchester University Press. ISBN 978-0-7190-8724-0.
