= Kishman =

Kishman is a surname. Notable people with the surname include:

- Matthew Kishman, American politician
- Tony Kishman, American vocalist

== See also ==
- Fishman
