= Surjo R. Soekadar =

German neuroscientist (born 1977)

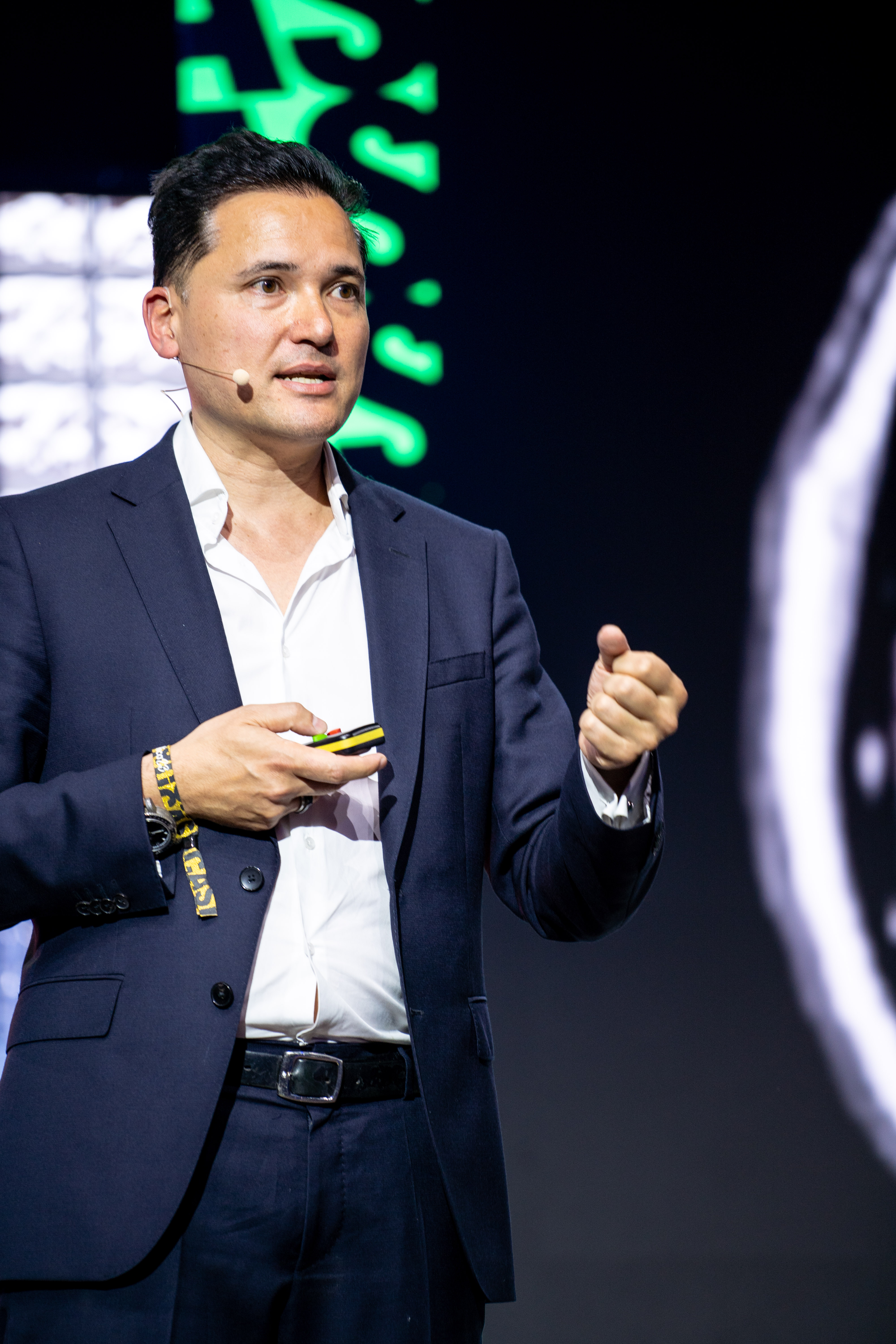
Surjo R. Soekadar at the re:publica conference 2023

Surjo Raphael Soekadar (born July 4, 1977 in Wiesbaden, Germany) is a German physician, neuroscientist and development aid worker.

He studied medicine in Mainz, Heidelberg and Baltimore and graduated under Herta Flor, ZI Mannheim, with a doctorate in clinical neuropsychology. From 2005 to 2018, he worked as a physician at the University of Tübingen, where he became head of the Applied Neurotechnology Lab in 2011. In 2018, he was appointed Germany's first Professor of Clinical Neurotechnology at the Charité - Universitätsmedizin Berlin. The professorship is supported by the Einstein Foundation Berlin.

Surjo Soekadar has been involved for many years in the field of development cooperation dealing with establishing youth health centers in Africa, South America and Asia. In 2001 he co-founded the Global Contract Foundation, Hamburg, and served as a board member of various non-governmental organizations, e.g. "Options For Life International" and the Global Contract Foundation. In 2004 he became the youngest creative member of the Club of Budapest after having drafted the first outline of the Global Marshall Plan Initiative.

Scientifically, he examines the adaptation of the brain to changing environmental conditions (neural plasticity). He is particularly working on the development and testing of clinical brain-machine interfaces (BMIs) and their combination with non-invasive brain stimulation (NIBS). In 2016, he and his team enabled quadriplegic patients with complete finger paralysis to eat and drink independently using a non-invasive brain/neural hand exoskeleton. In 2019, he demonstrated the feasibility of record the Bereitschaftspotential (or "readiness potential", a brain signal with an intensity of a few millionths of a volt that precedes voluntary movements by up to 1.5 seconds) outside the lab and under extreme conditions, namely before 192-meter bungee jumping.

As part of a research fellowship at the National Institute of Neurological Disorders and Stroke (NINDS), he and his colleagues were the first to record neuromagnetic brain activity in the millisecond range while the brain of a human subject underwent transcranial direct current stimulation (tDCS). It is expected that this new method will greatly contribute to a better understanding of electrical brain stimulation's clinical success and to solving various fundamental research questions in neuroscience.

In 2012 he received the International Annual BCI Research Award (together with Niels Birbaumer).
