= Yves Moreau =

Professor of Engineering at KU Leuven

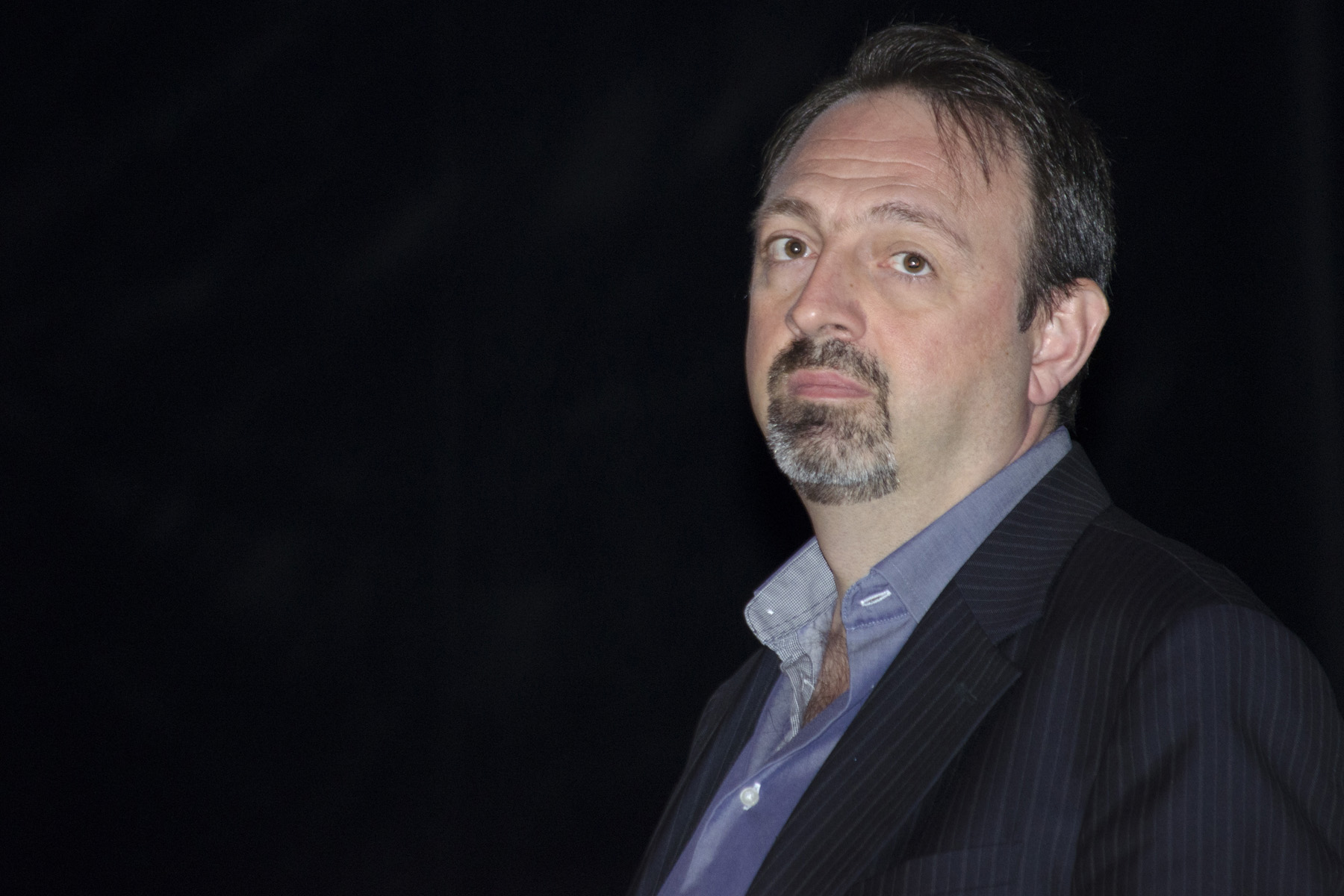
- Yves Moreau pictured in 2017
- Education: Faculté polytechnique de Mons; Brown University; KU Leuven (PhD)
- Awards: Doctor Honoris Causa UCLouvain (2025), Einstein Foundation Award for Promoting Quality in Research (2023), ISCB Fellow (2018), Scientific Award Foundation AstraZeneca – Bioinformatics (2016), FWO Siemens Prize (2002), Fulbright grantee (1992)
- Scientific career
- Institutions: KU Leuven
- Thesis: (1998)
- Website: www.yvesmoreau.net

Yves Moreau is a Professor of Engineering at KU Leuven. Moreau was elected a Fellow of the International Society for Computational Biology (ISCB) in 2018 for outstanding contributions to the fields of computational biology and bioinformatics.
