= Manisha Shah =

- Citizenship: United States

Academic background
- Education: B.A. (1995), Ph.D. (2006), University of California, Berkeley; MSc in Development Studies (1997) London School of Economics
- Doctoral advisor: Ethan Ligon

Academic work
- Discipline: Economics; Development
- Institutions: University of California, Berkeley; University of California, Los Angeles; University of California, Irvine
- Website: Official website; Information at IDEAS / RePEc

Manisha Shah is an American economist and academic who serves as Chancellor's Professor of Agricultural and Resource Economics at the University of California, Berkeley. She is a development economist whose primary research and teaching interests lie at the intersection of applied microeconomics, health, and gender.

== Education ==
Shah earned her Bachelor of Arts in Economics and Development Studies from University of California at Berkeley in 1995. She subsequently received an MSc in Development Studies from the London School of Economics in 1997. Returning to UC Berkeley, she completed both an MS (2003) and a PhD in Agricultural and Resource Economics (2006).

== Career ==
Shah spent much of her academic career at the University of California, Los Angeles (UCLA) where she progressed from Assistant Professor to Professor in the Department of Public Policy. During her tenure at UCLA, she held several leadership roles, including Vice-Chair of the department from 2017 to 2020, Founding Director of the Global Lab for Research in Action from 2019 to 2023, and Franklin D. Gilliam, Jr. Chair in Social Justice from 2021 to 2023.

Shah returned to UC Berkeley in 2023 when she was appointed Chancellor's Professor in 2023.

She has also held appointments in the Economics Department at the University of Melbourne from 2006 to 2009, UC Irvine from 2009 to 2012 served as a Visiting Assistant Professor at Princeton University's Center for Health and Wellbeing from 2010 to 2011.

Shah has served as editor of the Journal of Health Economics from 2018 to 2025, and is currently an associate editor of The Review of Economics and Statistics since 2021 as well as an editorial board member of the American Economic Review since 2024.

Shah is a faculty research associate at the National Bureau of Economic Research (NBER) and maintains affiliations with leading research organizations, including the Bureau for Research and Economic Analysis of Development (BREAD), the Abdul Latif Jameel Poverty Action Lab (J-PAL), the Center for Effective Global Action (CEGA), and the California Center for Population Research (CCPR).

Beyond her editorial work, she has contributed to the field through service on National Science Foundation economics panels, committees of the National Academies of Sciences, and multiple international advisory boards, reflecting her extensive influence on both the research and policy communities.

== Research and scholarly work ==
Her research has been supported by major institutions, including the Bill & Melinda Gates Foundation, World Bank, National Science Foundation, William and Flora Hewlett Foundation, National Institutes of Health, J-PAL, and Innovations for Poverty Action.

Shah's research agenda spans applied microeconomics, international development, global health, and policy evaluation, with a central focus on how public policies and interventions can improve health outcomes, education, human capital formation, and economic wellbeing in low- and middle-income settings. Her work combines rigorous empirical methods including randomized controlled trials (RCTs), impact evaluations, and quasi‑experimental designs to provide causal evidence on the effects of social programs and policies.

=== Global Health ===
==== Intimate partner violence (IPV) and sexual behaviors ====
Her research explores interventions that target female adolescents and their male partners to reduce IPV in East Africa. Her work has focused on involving males in the endeavor to decrease global IPV. She has written a paper which documents insights from the economics literature on causal and cost-effective methods to decrease IPV in LMICs.

==== Pandemic effects on violence and well-being ====
She documents how strict COVID-19 lockdowns correlated with increased reports of domestic violence (shadow pandemic) and how containment measures affected women's mental health and food security in India.

==== Health system responses and provider behaviors/biases ====
Shah's work in health economics investigates how health system characteristics and provider practices shape service quality and uptake in low‑income countries. In large RCTs across Tanzania, Burkina Faso, and Pakistan, she evaluates strategies to reduce bias among health care providers in family planning, improving the quality of reproductive services. She examines disparities in reproductive health care quality, showing persistent gaps in care for adolescents in sub-Saharan Africa.

Her recent work evaluates strategies to reduce bias among health care providers in family planning, improving the quality of reproductive services. She examines disparities in reproductive health care quality, showing persistent gaps in care for adolescents in sub-Saharan Africa.

==== Child health and sanitation infrastructure ====
A significant strand of Shah's research explores the impact of sanitation and infrastructure improvements on health and nutrition outcomes. In a multi‑country randomized field experiment, she and collaborators documented how increases in village sanitation coverage driven by behavior change and facility access led to measurable improvements in child height and health outcomes, with large gains observed once coverage passed defined thresholds.

=== Human capital, education, and labor ===
Shah studies how economic opportunities, public works programs, and early‑life conditions affect schooling and skill formation among children and adolescents. Her work explores the tradeoffs between labor supply and education investment, showing how program rollouts that increase labor demand can reduce school enrollment in some contexts while also generating long‑term welfare effects.

She has investigated how aggregate employment programs, such as India's National Rural Employment Guarantee Scheme (NREGS), impacted economic activity and output, showing that these programs can increase aggregate economic indicators while generating heterogeneous regional effects. She has also examined how this rural workfare program in India (NREGS) influenced adolescent labor versus schooling decisions, providing evidence on how expanding labor opportunities alters human capital investment.

Her research also addresses the long‑term effects of early life conditions, such as weather shocks and livelihoods, on later educational outcomes and income trajectories.

=== Other research ===
Shah is one of the leading economists who has studied the economics of sex work in both developing countries and the United States. Her study Risky Business: The Market for Unprotected Sex with Paul Gertler and Stefano Bertozzi was published in 2005 in the Journal of Political Economy. The study focused on how beauty and willingness to have unprotected sex affected the bargaining power and earnings of sex workers in Mexico.

Since then Shah has written papers on impacts of regulating sex markets showing with Scott Cunningham that decriminalization of indoor sex work in Rhode Island decreased STI transmission and reported rape offenses. In another seminar paper Shah and co-authors Lisa Cameron and Jennifer Seager show that criminalizing brothels in Indonesia increases the spread of STIs.

== Honors and awards ==
- Chancellor's Professorship, University of California, Berkeley (2023)
- Professor of the Year, UCLA Department of Public Policy (2018)
- Quartz Media Award for Best Economics Research (2017)
- Dean's Teaching Award, University of Melbourne (2008)
- Keynote Speaker, Liberal Arts Colleges Conference on Development Economics (2025)
- Keynote Speaker, French Economic Association Congress (2025)
- Keynote Speaker, Asian Meeting of the Econometric Society (2022)
- Keynote Speaker, Korean Economic Association (2022)
- Keynote Speaker, Latin American Health Economics Network Workshop (2024)

== Selected publications ==
- Cameron, Lisa; Shah, Manisha (2015). "Risk-Taking Behavior in the Wake of Natural Disasters". Journal of Human Resources. 50 (2): 484–515. doi:10.3368/jhr.50.2.484. ISSN 0022-166X.
- Cunningham, Scott; Shah, Manisha (December 20, 2017). "Decriminalizing Indoor Prostitution: Implications for Sexual Violence and Public Health". The Review of Economic Studies. 85 (3): 1683–1715. doi:10.1093/restud/rdx065. ISSN 0034-6527.
- Gertler, Paul; Shah, Manisha; Bertozzi, Stefano M. (2005). "Risky Business The Market for Unprotected Commercial Sex". Journal of Political Economy. 113 (3): 518–550. doi:10.1086/429700. ISSN 0022-3808.
- Cameron, Lisa; Seager, Jennifer; Shah, Manisha (September 26, 2020). "Crimes Against Morality: Unintended Consequences of Criminalizing Sex Work*". The Quarterly Journal of Economics. 136 (1): 427–469. doi:10.1093/qje/qjaa032. ISSN 0033-5533.
- Shah, Manisha; Steinberg, Bryce Millett (2017). "Drought of Opportunities: Contemporaneous and Long-Term Impacts of Rainfall Shocks on Human Capital". Journal of Political Economy. 125 (2): 527–561. doi:10.1086/690828. ISSN 0022-3808.
- Ravindran, Saravana; Shah, Manisha (January 19, 2023). "Unintended consequences of lockdowns, COVID-19 and the Shadow Pandemic in India". Nature Human Behaviour. 7 (3): 323–331. doi:10.1038/s41562-022-01513-5. ISSN 2397-3374. PMID 36658214.
- Chang, Tom Y.; Jacobson, Mireille; Shah, Manisha; Kopetsky, Matthew; Pramanik, Rajiv; Shah, Samir B. (July 24, 2023). "Reminders, but not monetary incentives, increase COVID-19 booster uptake". Proceedings of the National Academy of Sciences. 120 (31) e2302725120. Bibcode:2023PNAS..12002725C. doi:10.1073/pnas.2302725120. ISSN 0027-8424. PMC 10400997. PMID 37487101.
- Cameron, Lisa; Olivia, Susan; Shah, Manisha (2019). "Scaling up sanitation: Evidence from an RCT in Indonesia". Journal of Development Economics. 138: 1–16. doi:10.1016/j.jdeveco.2018.12.001. ISSN 0304-3878. PMC 6472610. PMID 31057208.
- Cunningham, Scott; Shah, Manisha, eds. (December 5, 2016). The Oxford Handbook of the Economics of Prostitution. Oxford Handbooks Online. Oxford University Press. doi:10.1093/oxfordhb/9780199915248.001.0001. ISBN 978-0-19-991524-8.
- Shah, Manisha; Baird, Sarah; Seager, Jennifer; Avuwadah, Benjamin; Hamory, Joan; Sabarwal, Shwetlena; Vyas, Amita (November 7, 2023). "Improving Mental Health of Adolescent Girls in Low- and Middle-Income Countries". Journal of Human Resources. 59 (S): S317–S364. doi:10.3368/jhr.1222-12707r2. ISSN 0022-166X.
