= Berkeley Initiative for Transparency in the Social Sciences =

Academic initiative dedicated to transparent social science research

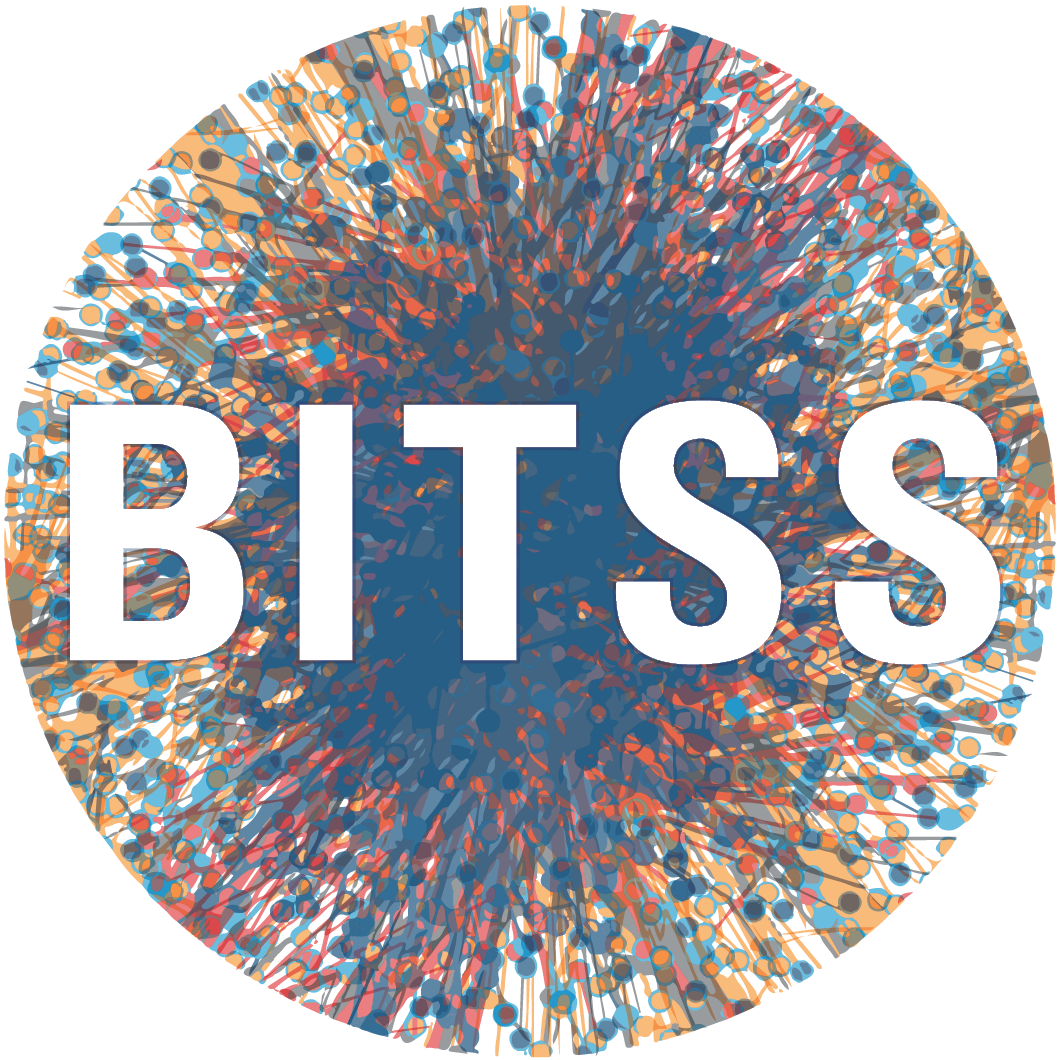
- Abbreviation: BITSS
- Formation: 2012
- Founder: Edward Miguel
- Type: Initiative
- Purpose: Promoting open research in the social sciences
- Headquarters: Berkeley, California
- Faculty Director: Edward Miguel
- Parent organization: Center for Effective Global Action
- Website: www.bitss.org

The Berkeley Initiative for Transparency in the Social Sciences, abbreviated BITSS, is an academic initiative dedicated to advancing transparency, reproducibility, and openness in social science research. It was established in 2012 by the University of California, Berkeley's Center for Effective Global Action. It has worked with the Center for Open Science to define and promote a set of best practices for social scientists to maximize transparency in their research. BITSS has also worked to promote registered reports, supporting journals like the Journal of Development Economics in taking up the review track.

In 2015, BITSS began awarding the annual Leamer-Rosenthal Prizes for Open Social Science to honor outstanding achievements and emerging leaders in promoting transparency in social science. Through its Catalyst program, the initiative also supports and empowers over 150 graduate students, faculty, librarians, and early career researchers to advance open science all over the world. Their annual Research Transparency and Reproducibility Training (RT2) provides an overview of and hands-on practice with tools and practices for transparent and reproducible social science research. Their Massive Open Online Course "Transparent and Open Social Science Research,” based on a UC Berkeley course taught by Edward Miguel, is available on the FutureLearn platform. In 2019, BITSS also began distributing copies of "Transparent and Reproducible Social Science Research," a textbook written by former BITSS Scientist Garret Christensen, Jeremy Freese, and Edward Miguel with support from BITSS, at their trainings and events.

BITSS has supported or led several metascience research projects including the State of Social Science (3S) study and the Social Science Meta-Analysis and Research Transparency (SSMART) portfolio. BITSS also manages MetaArxiv, an interdisciplinary archive hosted on OSF Preprints of articles focused on metascience, research transparency, and reproducibility.

In recent years, BITSS has begun developing digital infrastructure to enable open science practices. The Social Science Prediction Platform (SSPP), launched in 2020, enables the systematic collection and assessment of expert forecasts of research results and the effects of untested social programs. The Social Science Reproduction Platform (SSRP) crowdsources and catalogs attempts to assess and improve the computational reproducibility of social science research. The accompanying Guide for Accelerating Computational Reproducibility in the Social Sciences elucidates a common approach, terminology, and standards for conducting reproductions. These platforms are part of a growing ecosystem of tools that expand opportunities to participate in the scientific endeavor.

BITSS has also incubated an initiative on Open Policy Analysis (OPA), which seeks to strengthen connections between research and policy and reduce political polarization by translating open science practices to policy analysis. Led by Fernando Hoces de la Guardia, the OPA initiative has developed tools for US Senator Elizabeth Warren's wealth tax proposal and Evidence Action's Deworm the World program.

== See also ==
- Metascience
