= David H. Gutmann =

American neurologist

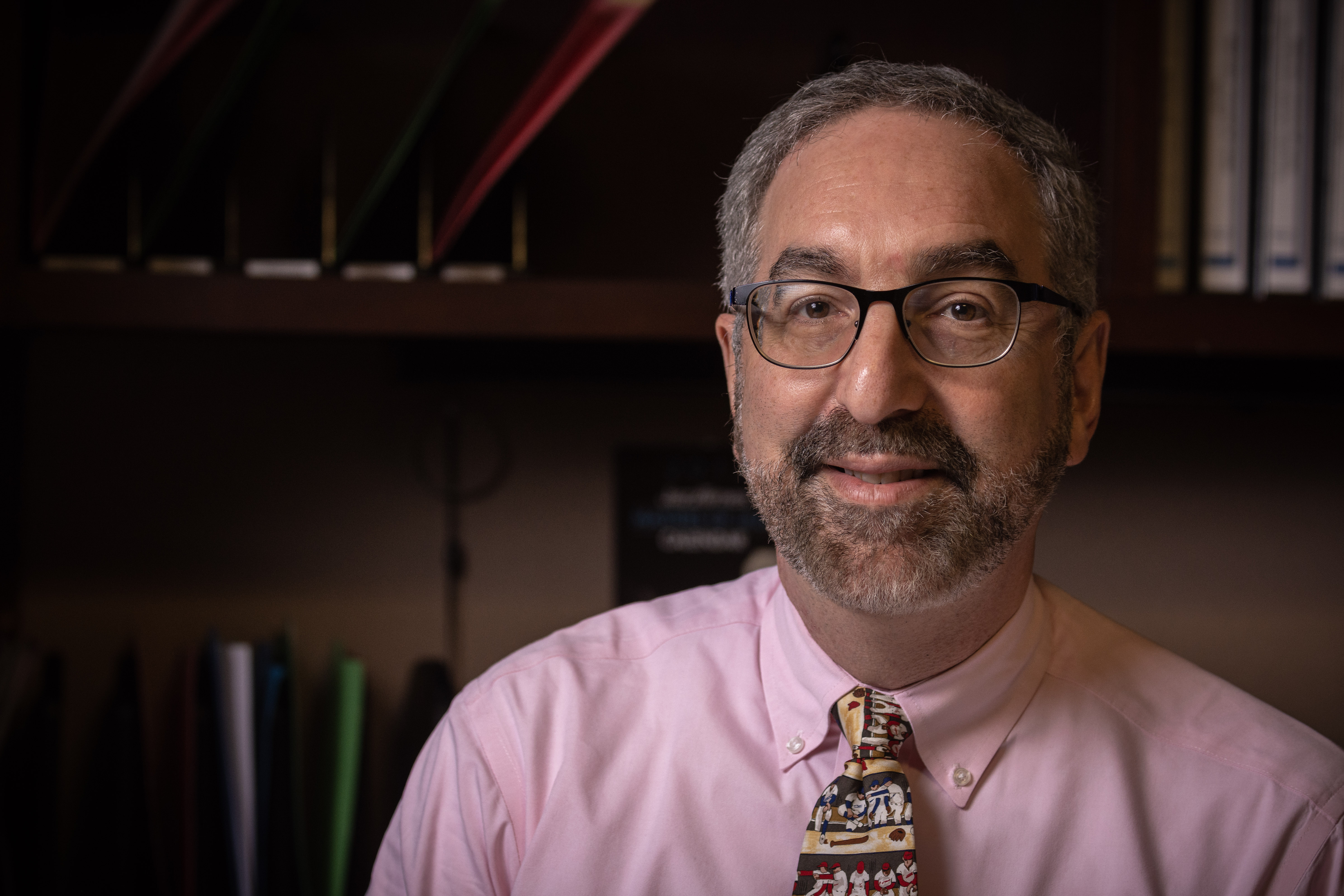
- Born: Cincinnati, Ohio
- Education: University of Michigan
- Known for: Neurofibromatosis
- Scientific career
- Workplaces: Washington University in St. Louis; University of Michigan
- Doctoral advisor: John E. Niederhuber
- Other academic advisors: Kenneth Fischbeck Francis S. Collins

David Hillel Gutmann is an American neurologist-neuroscientist. He teaches at Washington University in St. Louis, where he is the Donald O. Schnuck Family Professor, and Director of the Washington University Neurofibromatosis Center. He is an international expert in Neurofibromatosis, pioneering the use of preclinical models to understand brain tumors and neurodevelopmental delays in children with NF1.

== Early life and education ==
Raised in Michigan, Gutmann spent summers during his high school volunteering at the Henry Ford Hospital in Detroit, sparking his passion for medicine. While receiving an undergraduate degree at the University of Michigan, Gutmann was introduced to the budding field of genetics, the influence of which sowed seeds for his later research work. As an undergraduate, he also worked as a college disc jockey and attended numerous jazz concerts in Ann Arbor, establishing a life-long love of jazz music.

Further pursuing his education, Gutmann went on to complete his MD and PhD degrees at the University of Michigan. Under the guidance of John E. Niederhuber, he received his PhD in immunogenetics, graduating with distinction in 1986. Gutmann then completed his Neurology residency training at the University of Pennsylvania, spending time in the laboratory of Kenneth Fischbeck, where he was mentored in neurogenetics.

Returning to the University of Michigan for his postdoctoral research fellowship in Human Genetics, Gutmann joined the laboratory of Francis S. Collins. Collins and his team had just cloned the NF1 gene, and Gutmann was tasked with establishing the function of the NF1 gene. During his tenure with Collins, Gutmann identified the NF1 protein, neurofibromin, and proceeded to investigate its function as a RAS regulator.

== Research and career ==
Gutmann was recruited to Washington University in St. Louis in 1993. He became a full Professor in 2001, and then the Donald O. Schnuck Family Professor in 2002. In 2004, Gutmann founded the Washington University Neurofibromatosis (NF) Center and directs the Washington University NF Clinical Program. In addition to numerous grant review panels and journal editorial boards, he served as a member of the National Institute of Neurological Disorders and Stroke Advisory Council. Gutmann is an elected fellow of the American Academy of Neurology, American Neurological Association American Association for the Advancement of Science, Association of American Physicians, and the National Academy of Medicine. For his contributions to NF and neuro-oncology, he has been honored with numerous awards, including the 2002 National Neurofibromatosis Foundation Center of Excellence Award, the 2012 Children's Tumor Foundation Frederich von Recklinghausen Award, the 2019 Society for Neuro-Oncology Abhijit Award, and the 2020 American Academy of Neurology Neuro-Oncology Investigator Award. In addition, Gutmann currently serves on the Board of Directors for Jazz St. Louis.

Over the past 30 years at Washington University in St. Louis, the Gutmann laboratory has published over 500 peer-reviewed manuscripts. Currently, his research team uses human biospecimens and novel genetically engineered mouse strains to investigate the genetic, molecular, and cellular basis of neurofibromatosis. They are employing these preclinical mouse models to better understand the cellular origins of tumors, the contribution of the tumor microenvironment to tumor formation and growth, and the major growth control pathways that dictate brain development in NF1. The ultimate goal of Gutmann's research is to be able to predict which course NF1 will take in any given individual, and to engineer treatment plans based on those predictions.

As Director of the Washington University NF Center, Gutmann focuses on providing care to those affected with neurofibromatosis. Beyond the hospital, care is also provided through several complementary care programs: Beat NF(now Music Heals) provides jazz-music therapy for affected toddlers, Club NF provides play-based therapy for school-aged children, and Totally Teen NF serves as a peer support and social skills group for affected adolescents. Music Heals is a collaboration between the Washington University NF Center, St. Louis Children's Hospital, and Jazz St. Louis, the only jazz music-based motor therapy program for children with NF1.

== Awards and honors ==
- 1993 March of Dimes Young Investigator Award, FASEB Summer
- 1994 Peter A. Aron National Neurofibromatosis Foundation Award
- 1996 Decade of the Brain Plenary Session Speaker, American Academy of Neurology
- 1998 Carolyn Farb Endowed Lecture in Neurofibromatosis
- 1998 National Neurofibromatosis Foundation Crystal Award
- 1999 Walker Lecturer in Neurofibromatosis
- 1999 Eliason Teaching Award, Department of Neurology
- 2001 Linse Block Neuro-oncology Visiting Professor, Mayo Clinic Foundation
- 2002 National Neurofibromatosis Foundation Center of Excellence Award
- 2003 Washington University School of Medicine Clinical Teacher of the Year Award
- 2006 Manuel R. Gomez Named Visiting Professor
- 2007 Ninth Annual Arthur and Sonia Labatt Brain Tumor Research Centre Lecturer
- 2007 Award for Excellence in Pediatric Basic/Translational Research, Society for Neuro-Oncology
- 2008 Award for Excellence in Pediatric Translational Research, Society for Neuro-Oncology
- 2008 Takao Hoshino Lectureship, University of California – San Francisco
- 2010 Pfizer Visiting Professor, University of Virginia
- 2010 Washington University/Siteman Cancer Center "Rock Doc"
- 2012 Children's Tumor Foundation Frederich Von Recklinghausen (Lifetime Achievement) Award
- 2013 Susan B. Stine Memorial Lectureship
- 2013 16th Annual Sara Hertafeld Memorial Lectureship
- 2014 8th Annual Riley Church Guest Professor, Stanford University
- 2017 Alexander von Humboldt Research Award
- 2017-2022 Berlin Institute of Health Einstein Visiting Fellowship
- 2018 Elected Fellow, American Academy of Neurology (AAN)
- 2019 Society for Neuro-Oncology Abjihit Guha Award and Lecture
- 2020 American Academy of Neurology Neuro-Oncology Investigator Award
- 2020 National Neurofibromatosis Network Advocate of Hope Award
- 2020 American Neurological Association George W. Jacobi Award
- 2020 Elected Fellow, American Association for the Advancement of Science (AAAS)
- 2022 Elected Fellow, Association of American Physicians (AAP)
- 2022 Elected Fellow, National Academy of Medicine (NAM)
