= Eva Vivalt =

Canadian economist

Eva L. Vivalt
- Born: Toronto, Ontario, Canada

Academic background
- Education: Dartmouth College; University of California, Berkeley; University of Oxford
- Doctoral advisor: Edward Miguel

Academic work
- Discipline: Developmental economics, Labor economics
- Institutions: University of Toronto
- Website: https://evavivalt.com/

Eva Love Vivalt is a Canadian economist. She is currently an Assistant Professor of Economics and faculty affiliate of the Schwartz Reisman Institute at the University of Toronto.

She is the founder of AidGrade, a research institute that generates and synthesizes evidence in international development.

== Education ==
Vivalt received a Ph.D. in Economics and an M.A. in Mathematics from the University of California, Berkeley, and an M.Phil. in Development Studies at the University of Oxford.

Before joining the University of Toronto, she held positions at Australian National University, Stanford University, New York University, and the World Bank.

== Academic career ==
Vivalt's main research interests are the study of obstacles to evidence-based policy decisions and unconditional cash transfers. She is a principal investigator on Y Combinator Research’s basic income study.

She is considered an expert on evidence aggregation and the use of Bayesian hierarchical models and is known for her work on metascience.

Research on the external validity of impact evaluations

Vivalt is known for her work on the external validity of impact evaluations.

As a basis for this work, she built a large database of impact evaluations in global development. She found that most development interventions cannot be distinguished from one another in terms of the impacts that they have on a particular outcome and that effect sizes greatly vary within a particular intervention-outcome combination.

Her work in this area has been cited by Angus Deaton, Lant Pritchett, and other leading economists and has entered the public discourse.

== Other activity ==
In 2019, together with Stefano DellaVigna and Devin Pope, Vivalt launched Social Science Prediction Platform, a tool that enables researchers to forecast the results of ongoing studies in the social sciences. Her research on impact evaluation has been covered by The Washington Post, Vox, The Atlantic, and other publications.

Vivalt is a member of Giving What We Can, a community of people who have pledged to donate 10% of their income to the world's most effective charitable organisations.

== Personal life ==
Vivalt married American economist Gabriel Carroll in August 2019.
