= Stefan Rinke =

German historian (born 1965)

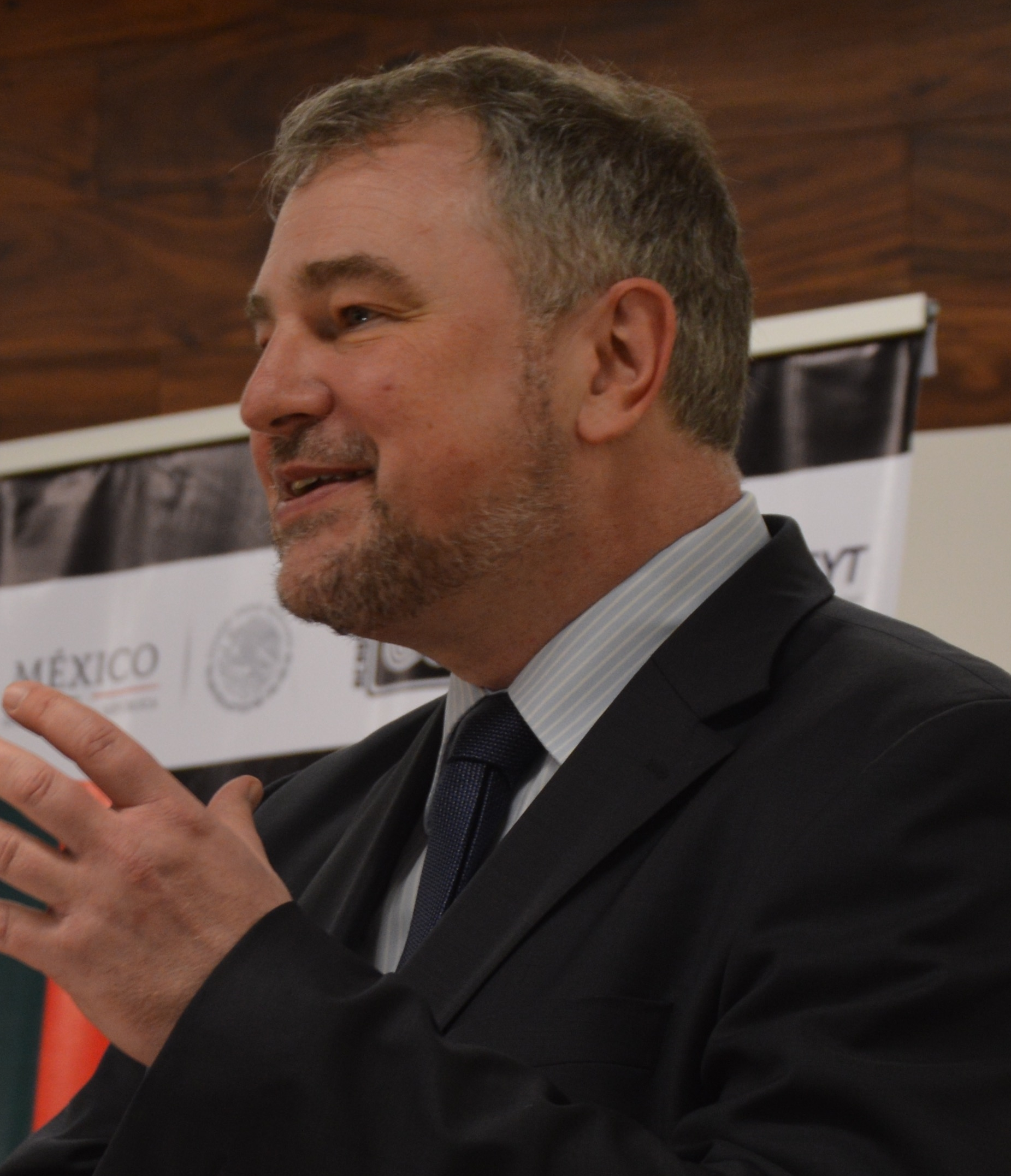
Stefan Rinke in Mexico City, 2018.

Stefan Rinke (born 31 December 1965 in Helmstedt) is a German historian. Since 2005, he has been professor of Latin American History at the Latin American Institute and at the Friedrich-Meinecke-Institut at Freie Universität Berlin.

== Biography ==
After graduating from the Gymnasium Julianum in Helmstedt in 1984, Stefan Rinke studied history and American studies in Bamberg and Bowling Green (Ohio) from 1985 to 1990. He completed his studies in 1989 with a Master of Arts in Bowling Green and in 1990 with a diploma in history in Bamberg. The Friedrich-Ebert-Stiftung supported him with a doctoral scholarship from 1991 to 1993. In 1995 he received his doctorate at the Catholic University of Eichstätt with a thesis on German-Latin American relations during the Weimar Republic from a transnational perspective. His advisor was Hans-Joachim König. The thesis was published in 1996 as the first volume of the Historamericana series, which was founded by König and Rinke. From 2021 to 2024, the Historamericana series was published by the Wissenschaftliche Buchgesellschaft and has since been continued by Herder Verlag in Freiburg im Breisgau. The volumes are available as Open Access Gold and Print on Demand.

From 1996 to 1998, the German Research Foundation (DFG) granted him a postdoctoral fellowship. During this time he spent research periods in Santiago de Chile and Washington D.C., among other places. In September 1998 he was appointed Visiting Assistant Professor for the Comparative History of the Americas and Europe at Tufts University, where he taught until 1999.

In 1999 Stefan Rinke took up a position as assistant professor in Eichstätt. In 2003, he qualified as a professor (Habilitation) with a thesis on North Americanization and socio-cultural change in Chile. In 2005, he was appointed professor of Latin American history at Freie Universität Berlin. From 2007 to 2009, from 2017 to 2019, and from 2023 to 2024, Rinke was chairman of the institute council of the Latin American Institute at the Freie Universität Berlin.

== Research focus ==
Stefan Rinke explores the history of Latin America primarily from a transregional and global historical perspective. His research focuses on cultural globalization and North Americanization, popular culture, revolutions, memory and historical consciousness, history of knowledge, trans-American relations, temporality and future. They cover the period from colonial times (Columbus, Conquista of Mexico, Creole identities), the independence period (Atlantic revolutions, thinking about the future), the 19th century (state-building and dictatorships, USA and Latin America), the 20th century (World War I, football, aviation, experts) to contemporary history (memory and conflict in Colombia and Chile, Colonia Dignidad). His territorial focus lies on Chilean and Mexican history, among others.

== International activities ==
Stefan Rinke has been Visiting Professor and Research Fellow at leading international universities, including El Colegio de México and Pontificia Universidad Católica de Chile.

From 2009 to 2018, he was spokesperson of the first German-Latin American Research Training Group (IGK 1531 "Between Spaces - Entre Espacios"), a cooperation with Mexican partners dedicated to interdisciplinary research on globalization in history and the present. In the Collaborative Research Center 700 "Governance in Spaces of Limited Statehood" he served as co-spokesperson from 2010 to 2017.

In 2014 he organized the European Congress of Historians of Latin America at Freie Universität and was president of the Asociación de Historiadores Latinoamericanistas Europeos (AHILA) from 2014 to 2017.

Since 2019, Stefan Rinke has been the spokesperson of the International Research Training Group "Temporalities of Future in Latin America: Dynamics of Aspiration and Anticipation," a German-Mexican cooperation dedicated to researching temporalities of the future in the humanities and social sciences. From 2019 to 2022, he also directed an oral history project on Colonia Dignidad in Chile, funded by the German Foreign Office on behalf of the German Bundestag (CDOH).

In the project Gumelab, funded by the Federal Ministry of Education and Research, Rinke and his team have been investigating since 2021 the effects of telenovelas and series in Latin America on the political attitudes and historical consciousness of viewers. Since 2023, he is also head of the research project Selbstzeugnisse von Juden nach der Rückkehr aus Lateinamerika nach Berlin (1945/49-1970), which is funded by the Einstein Foundation Berlin.

Stefan Rinke is a host to numerous scholarship holders and researchers from all over the world. He also successfully nominated the historians. He has also successfully nominated the historians Hilda Sabato (2011), Irina Podgorny (2013), Raanan Rein (2016), Max Paul Friedman (2018), Ricardo Pérez Montfort (2020), Lilia Moritz Schwarcz (2021) and Diego Armus (2023) for Alexander von Humboldt Foundation Awards.

He has supervised numerous award-winning doctoral theses. His students hold professorships in Argentina, Brazil, Chile, Costa Rica, Denmark, Colombia, Mexico, the Netherlands, Peru and Switzerland. In his department, a successfully completed habilitation as well as many postdoctoral projects of researchers from Germany and abroad have been developed so far.

Rinke is a member of the advisory board of the German Historical Institute Washington D.C. and Berkeley, the Centro Maria Sibylla Merian de Estudios Avanzados (CALAS) in Guadalajara, Mexico, and the Einstein Foundation Berlin. He is also a member of the editorial board of international scientific journals. He regularly reviews for academic publishers, journals and scientific organizations on three continents.

== Awards and honors ==
In 2003, Stefan Rinke was awarded the Eichstätter Universitätsgesellschaft Prize for his habilitation thesis. For the period from 2013 to 2015 he received a Research Fellowship from the Einstein Foundation Berlin. In 2017 he was awarded the Premio Alzate of the Mexican Academy of Sciences and the Consejo Nacional de Ciencia y Tecnología (Mexico) for his complete works. In the following year the Universidad Nacional de San Martín in Buenos Aires awarded him an honorary doctorate. In 2019, the Dahlem Research School presented him with the Award for Excellent Doctoral Supervision. The Academia Mexicana de la Historia and the Ecuadorian Academia Nacional de Historia appointed Rinke a corresponding member. Rinke was honored a Talent Scout in the Henriette Herz Scouting Program of the Alexander von Humboldt Foundation in 2020.

== Authored works (selection) ==
- Conquistadoren und Azteken. Cortés und die Eroberung Mexikos. C. H. Beck, München 2019, ISBN 978-3-406-73399-4
  - English: Conquistadors and Aztecs: A History of the Fall of Tenochtitlan. Oxford University Press, 2023. ISBN 978-0-19-755246-9
  - Spanish: Conquistadores y aztecas. Cortés y la conquista de México. edaf, 2021. ISBN 978-84-414-4076-0
- with Walther L. Bernecker, Mariano Delgado, Friedrich Edelmayer, Nikolas Jaspert und Ursula Prutsch: Weltreich Spanien: Das Goldene Zeitalter. Wissenschaftliche Buchgesellschaft, Darmstadt 2019, ISBN 978-3-8062-4020-7
- Lateinamerika. Theiss, Darmstadt 2015, ISBN 978-3-8062-2601-0
- Im Sog der Katastrophe. Lateinamerika und der Erste Weltkrieg. Campus, Frankfurt am Main 2015, ISBN 978-3-593-50269-4
  - English: Latin America and the First World War. Cambridge University Press. Cambridge 2017, ISBN 978-1-107-56606-4
  - Spanish: América Latina y la primera Guerra Mundial. Una historia global. FCE, Mexiko 2019, ISBN 978-607-16-6553-9
- Kolumbus und der Tag von Guanahani 1492. Ein Wendepunkt der Geschichte. Theiss, Stuttgart 2013, ISBN 978-3-8062-2731-4
- with Frederik Schulze: Kleine Geschichte Brasiliens. Beck, München 2013, ISBN 978-3-406-64441-2
- Lateinamerika und die USA. Eine Geschichte zwischen Räumen – von der Kolonialzeit bis heute. (= Geschichte Kompakt). Wissenschaftliche Buchgesellschaft, Darmstadt 2012, ISBN 978-3-534-24551-2
  - Spanish: América Latina y Estados Unidos. Una historia entre espacios desde la época colonial hasta hoy. Marcial Pons/El Colegio de México, Madrid/México 2015, ISBN 978-84-15963-19-6
  - Portuguese: América Latina e Estados Unidos. Uma história entre espaços - do período colonial aos dias atuais. Autografía/EDUPE, Rio de Janeiro, 2015.
- Revolutionen in Lateinamerika. Wege in die Unabhängigkeit, 1760–1830. Beck, München 2010, ISBN 978-3-406-60142-2
  - Spanish: Las revoluciones en América Latina: Las vías a la independencia, 1760–1830. El Colegio de México, México 2011, ISBN 978-607-462-299-7
- Geschichte Lateinamerikas. Von den frühesten Kulturen bis zur Gegenwart. Beck-Wissen. Beck, München 2010, ISBN 978-3-406-60693-9
  - Turkish: Latin Amerika Tarihi: Ilk Uygarliklardan Bugüne. Runik Kitap, Istanbul 2021. ISBN 978-625-7757-70-6
  - Portuguese: História de América Latina: Das Culturas Pre-Colombianas até o Presente. ediPUCRS, Porto Alegre 2012, ISBN 978-85-397-0204-6
  - Spanish: Historia de Latinoamérica. Desde las primeras culturas hasta el presente. El Colegio de México, México, 2016.
- Kleine Geschichte Chiles. Beck, München 2007, ISBN 978-3-406-54804-8
- Begegnungen mit dem Yankee: Nordamerikanisierung und soziokultureller Wandel in Chile, 1898–1990 (= Lateinamerikanische Forschungen. Band 32). Böhlau, Köln 2004, ISBN 3-412-06804-7
  - Spanish: Encuentros con el yanqui: norteamericanización y cambio sociocultural en Chile 1898–1990. DIBAM, Santiago de Chile 2013, ISBN 978-956-244-071-4
- Cultura de masas, reforma y nacionalismo en Chile, 1910–1931. Universidad Católica/Centro de Investigaciones Diego Barros Arana, Valparaiso 2002, ISBN 956-244-151-2
- „Der letzte freie Kontinent“. Deutsche Lateinamerikapolitik im Zeichen transnationaler Beziehungen, 1918–1933. 2 Teilbände. Heinz, Stuttgart 1996, ISBN 3-88099-670-9
- Zwischen Weltpolitik und Monroe Doktrin: Botschafter Speck von Sternburg und die deutsch-amerikanischen Beziehungen, 1898–1908 (= Deutsch-Amerikanische Studien. Band 11). Heinz, Stuttgart 1992, ISBN 3-88099-629-6

== Edited works (selection) ==
- with Philipp Kandler and Dorothee Wein (eds): Colonia Dignidad: Neue Debatten und interdisziplinäre Perspektiven (Frankfurt a.M./New York: Campus, 2023).
- with Karina Kriegesmann (eds): Aufbrüche und Umbrüche: 50 Jahre Lateinamerika Institut der Freien Universität Berlin (Berlin: Freie Universität, 2022). DOI: http://dx.doi.org/10.17169/refubium-38622.
- with Carlos Riojas (eds.): Repensar el “Mundo”: Reflexiones y representaciones globales (siglos XV–XX) (Darmstadt: Wissenschaftliche Buchgesellschaft 2022), ISBN 978-3-534-27517-5.
- with Carlos Riojas (eds.): América Latina y la historia global: Repensar el mundo (México/ Buenos Aires: Siglo XXI, 2022), ISBN 978-3-534-27517-5.
- with Carlos Alba Vega and Marianne Braig (eds.), La violencia en América Latina entre espacios temporales del pasado y del futuro (Berlin: Tranvía, 2022).
- with Nelson Chacón (eds.): Recopilación de fuentes para la historia Mapuche, siglos XVII, XVIII y XIX: edición y comentarios (Darmstadt: Wissenschaftliche Buchgesellschaft 2021), ISBN 978-3-534-30000-6 .
- with Federico Navarrete and Nino Vallen (eds.): Der Codex Mendoza: Das Meisterwerk aztekisch-spanischer Buchkultur (wbg Edition: Darmstadt, 2021), ISBN 978-3-534-27355-3 .
- with Christian Cwik and Hans-Joachim König (eds.): Diktaturen in Lateinamerika im Zeitalter des Kalten Krieges (Stuttgart: Heinz, 2020), ISBN 978-3-88099-669-4 .
- with Raanan Rein and David M.K. Sheinin (eds.): Migrants, Refugees, and Asylum Seekers in Latin America. Jewish Latin America, Vol. 12 (Leiden: Brill, 2020), ISBN 978-90-04-43224-6 .
- with Nikolaus Böttcher and Nino Vallen (eds.): Distributive Struggle and the Self in the Early Modern World (Stuttgart: Heinz 2019).
- with Michael Wildt (eds.): Revolutions and Counter-Revolutions: 1917 and its Aftermath from a Global Perspective (Frankfurt: Campus 2017).
- with Carlos Riojas (eds.): Historia global: perspectivas y tensiones (Stuttgart: Heinz 2017).
- with Raanan Rein and Nadia Zysman (eds.): The New Ethnic Studies in Latin America (Leiden: Brill, 2017).
- with Mónika Contreras Saiz and Tajana Louis (eds.): Memoria y conflicto - memorias en conflicto: intercambios metódicos y teóricos de experiencias locales latinoamericanas (Stuttgart: Heinz 2016).
- with Ingrid Kummels, Claudia Rauhut and Birte Timm (eds.): Transatlantic Caribbean: Dialogues of People, Practice, Ideas (Bielefeld: Transcript, 2014).
- with Delia González de Reufels (eds.): Expert Knowledge in Latin American History: Local, Transnational, and Global Perspectives (Stuttgart: Heinz, 2014).
- with Mónika Contreras Saiz and Lasse Hölck (eds.): Gobernanza y seguridad: la conquista republicana de las fronteras latinoamericanas en el siglo XIX (Stuttgart: Heinz, 2014).
- with Diego Armus (eds.): Del football al fútbol/futebol: Historias argentinas, brasileras y uruguayas en el siglo XX (Frankfurt a.M./Madrid: Vervuert, 2014).
- with Kay Schiller (eds.): The FIFA World Cup 1930–2010: Politics, Commerce, Spectacle and Identities (Göttingen: Wallstein, 2014).
- with Carlos Alba and Marianne Braig (eds.): Latin America and Asia – Relations in the context of Globalization from Colonial Times to the Present. América Latina y Asia – relaciones en el context de la globalización de la época colonia hasta el presente (Stuttgart: Heinz, 2014).
- with Christina Peters (eds.): Global Play: Football Between Region, Nation, and the World in Latin American, African, and European History (Stuttgart: Heinz, 2014).
- with Georg Fischer, Christina Peters, Frederik Schulze (eds.): Brasilien in der Welt: Region, Nation und Globalisierung, 1870–1945 (Frankfurt a.M.: Campus 2013).
- with Carlos Alba, Marianne Braig and Guillermo Zermeño (eds.): Entre Espacios: Movimientos, actores y representaciones de la globalización (Berlin: Tranvía, 2013).
- with Hans-Peter Hinz and Frederik Schulze (eds.): Bicentenario: 200 Jahre Unabhängigkeit in Lateinamerika. Geschichte zwischen Erinnerung und Zukunft (Stuttgart-Berlin: Heinz-Deutsches Historisches Museum, 2011).
- with Inga Luther, Nina Elsemann and Franka Bindernagel (eds.): Erinnerung schreibt Geschichte: Lateinamerika und Europa im Kontext transnationaler Verflechtungen. (Stuttgart: Heinz, 2011).
- with Helmut Bley, Hans-Joachim König and Kirsten Rüther, ed. of the dimension Global Interaction, Enzyklopädie der Neuzeit [Encyclopedia of the Early Modern Period], 16 vols. (Stuttgart: Metzler, 2005–2012). ISBN 978-3-476-01935-6.
- with Hans-Joachim König editor of the book series HISTORAMERICANA (Stuttgart: Heinz, since 2021 Darmstadt: Wissenschaftliche Buchgesellschaft).
- with Jörg Baberowski and Michael Wildt editor of the book series Eigene und Fremde Welten (Frankfurt a.M.: Campus)
- Co-editor of the book series Inter-American Perspectives (Münster: Lit; Tempe: Bilingual Press).
- Co-editor of Boletín del Instituto de Historia Argentina y Americana Dr. Emilio Ravignani (Buenos Aires: Universidad de Buenos Aires), ISSN 1850-2563.
- Co-editor of Geschichte und Gesellschaft (Göttingen: Vandenhoek & Ruprecht), ISSN 2196-9000.
- Co-editor of Iberoamericana: América Latina, España, Portugal (Frankfurt a.M./Madrid: Vervuert). ISSN 1577-3388.
