= Cecilia Clementi =

Italian scientist

- Education: University of Florence; International School for Advanced Studies
- Scientific career
- Workplaces: University of California, San Diego; Rice University; Free University of Berlin

Cecilia Clementi is an Italian-American scientist who specialises in the simulation of biomolecules. She is a Professor of Theoretical and Computational Biophysics at the Free University of Berlin. She was previously a Professor of Chemistry at the Rice University and co-director of the National Science Foundation Molecular Sciences Software Institute. From 2017 to 2019, she held an Einstein Foundation fellowship.

== Early life and education ==
Clementi is from Italy. She studied physics at the University of Florence, where she earned her Laurea in 1995. After graduating in physics, Clementi moved to the International School for Advanced Studies for her doctoral degree. Clementi was a postdoctoral fellow at the University of California, San Diego, where she was part of the La Jolla Interfaces in Science programme. After completing her postdoctoral research Clementi was appointed as an assistant professor at Rice University.

== Research and career ==
In 2009 Clementi was made a Professor of Chemistry at Rice University. Her research considers the simulation of complex biophysical processes using large-scale data sets. She specializes in coarse-grain modeling of macromolecular systems. In 2016, Clementi was made co-director of the National Science Foundation Molecular Sciences Software Institute.

Clementi joined the Free University of Berlin in 2017 as an Einstein Foundation fellow, during which she focused on the multi-scale modelling of biophysical systems in an effort to better understand cellular functions. She was the first Einstein Foundation fellow to be appointed to their Strategic Professorships Program.

Clementi was made a Professor of Physics at the Free University of Berlin in June 2020.

More recently, Clementi has collaborated with others to use a machine-learning model to navigate protein landscapes.

== Awards and honours ==
- 2004 National Science Foundation CAREER Award
- 2007 Hamill Innovation award
- 2009 Robert A. Welch Foundation Norman Hackerman Award in Chemical Research
- 2014 Hamill Innovation award

== Selected publications ==
- Clementi, Cecilia; Nymeyer, Hugh; Onuchic, José Nelson (19 May 2000). "Topological and energetic factors: what determines the structural details of the transition state ensemble and "en-route" intermediates for protein folding? an investigation for small globular proteins11Edited by F. E. Cohen". Journal of Molecular Biology. 298 (5): 937–953. doi:10.1006/jmbi.2000.3693. ISSN 0022-2836. PMID 10801360. S2CID 5774992.
- Clementi, Cecilia (1 February 2008). "Coarse-grained models of protein folding: toy models or predictive tools?". Current Opinion in Structural Biology. Folding and Binding / Protein-nucleic acid interactions. 18 (1): 10–15. doi:10.1016/j.sbi.2007.10.005. ISSN 0959-440X. PMID 18160277.
- Das, Payel; Moll, Mark; Stamati, Hernán; Kavraki, Lydia E.; Clementi, Cecilia (27 June 2006). "Low-dimensional, free-energy landscapes of protein-folding reactions by nonlinear dimensionality reduction". Proceedings of the National Academy of Sciences. 103 (26): 9885–9890. Bibcode:2006PNAS..103.9885D. doi:10.1073/pnas.0603553103. ISSN 0027-8424. PMC 1502548. PMID 16785435.
- The complete list of publication is available on Google scholar

== Underwater photography ==
Clementi is also a scuba divemaster and underwater photographer. Some of her photographs are shown in her Instagram page
