= Juri Rappsilber =

German chemist

- Born: 1971 (age 54–55)
- Education: EMBL Heidelberg (2001, PhD); Technische Universität Berlin (1995, Diplom)
- Awards: EMBO Membership
- Scientific career
- Fields: Mass spectrometry; Proteomics
- Workplaces: Technische Universität Berlin; University of Edinburgh
- Doctoral advisor: Michael Karas

Juri Rappsilber (born 1971) is a German chemist in the area of mass spectrometry and proteomics.

== Career ==
Rappsilber studied chemistry at Technische Universität Berlin, University of Strathclyde, and with Tom Rapoport, Harvard Medical School. In 2001, he earned his Ph.D. in Proteomics jointly from EMBL Heidelberg and the Goethe University Frankfurt working in the laboratory of Matthias Mann on the mass spectrometric analysis of protein complexes, externally supervised by Michael Karas. He followed Mann to the University of Southern Denmark and completed a postdoctoral fellowship before starting his independent career at IFOM - FIRC Institute for Molecular Oncology, Milan in 2003. In 2006, he joined the Wellcome Trust Centre for Cell Biology in the Institute of Cell Biology at the University of Edinburgh. In 2009, he became a senior research fellow of the Wellcome Trust, in 2010 he was appointed Professor of Proteomics in Edinburgh. Since 2011, he has been Full Professor and head of the Chair of Bioanalytics at TU Berlin.

== Research ==
Rappsilber's interests are focused on combining chemistry and computer science with biological mass spectrometry to expand the current knowledge on how cells work. His lab is working on novel methods for identifying and quantifying the interactions and the accurate sites of interaction of proteins with other proteins, DNA and RNA. As a central tool they have pioneered crosslinking mass spectrometry. Technologically, they bridge organic chemistry, protein & nucleotide chemistry, molecular biology, separation sciences, mass spectrometry, data visualisation, programming and machine learning. Their vision is to reveal the dynamic structure and interactions of every protein in a cell, in a time-resolved manner.

== Awards ==
- 2023 ERC Synergy Grant TransFORM
- 2023 TU Berlin Award for exemplary teaching
- 2023 Mass Spectrometry in the Life Sciences Award of the German Mass Spectrometry Society (Deutsche Gesellschaft für Massenspektrometrie, DGMS)
- 2021 Elected EMBO Member
- 2020 EuPA Crosslinking Mass Spectrometry Award
- 2009 Senior Research Fellow of the Wellcome Trust
- 2005 Marie Curie Excellence Fellow
- 2001 Marie Curie Fellow
