= Solomon Hsiang =

American scientist and economist

Solomon M. Hsiang is an American scientist and economist who directs the Global Policy Laboratory and is a Professor of Global Environmental Policy at Stanford University. He co-founded the Climate Impact Lab and is a National Geographic Explorer. Hsiang's work has been featured in media articles and impacted policy across international and US federal institutions.

== Education ==
In 2006, he received a B.S. in Ocean and Atmospheric Physics, writing a thesis on "Ozone chemistry during global glaciations" advised by R. Alan Plumb, and a B.S. in International Development and Regional Planning, both from MIT. He was mentored by David Autor, Esther Duflo, and Kerry Emanuel.

In 2011, Hsiang received a PhD in Sustainable Development at Columbia University. His dissertation developed new methods to integrate climate science, economics, and political science. His thesis advisors were Mark Cane and William Bentley MacLeod. Hsiang completed postdoctoral appointments at Princeton University with Michael Oppenheimer and the National Bureau of Economic Research with Wolfram Schlenker and David Lobell.

== Career ==
Hsiang joined the faculty at the University of California, Berkeley in 2013 in the Goldman School of Public Policy, where he was tenured in 2015 and promoted to full professor in 2018. At Berkeley he founded the Global Policy Laboratory, an interdisciplinary research group focused on using data science to understand the effects of global environmental change and international policy on economics, conflict, health, and agriculture. In 2019 he was a visiting professor at Stanford University. In 2024 he moved to the Stanford University Doerr School of Sustainability.

In 2023-2024, Hsiang served as the first Chief Environmental Economist at White House Office of Science Technology and Policy where he led work across dozens of federal agencies to update national economic statistics to account for natural capital.

Hsiang co-founded the Climate Impact Lab with Robert Kopp, Michael Greenstone, and Trevor Houser, a collaboration of climate scientists, economists, and computational experts. The lab conducts research and advises governments and companies.

== Research ==
Hsiang's work is characterized by applying econometrics and machine learning to questions that bridge science and economics.

=== Climate change ===
Hsiang's work on the economics of climate change demonstrated that high temperatures and hurricanes slowed economic growth, including in the United States. Hsiang's research indicates climate change could reduce economic output and increase economic inequality. In a 2017 New York Times op-ed, Trevor Houser and Hsiang calculated that Hurricane Maria likely destroyed 26 years of economic development in Puerto Rico. Hsiang developed the Data-driven Spatial Climate Impact Model (DSCIM) at the Climate Impact Lab.

Hsiang and his coauthors demonstrated that climate changes influence the likelihood of violence in human societies around the world and throughout history. Hsiang's team has calculated that global warming will increase crime and civil conflict.

In a 2014 analysis, Hsiang and coauthors demonstrated that extended periods of extreme temperatures increased migration in Indonesia. With Adam Sobel, he demonstrated that weak temperature gradients in the tropics could cause extreme migrations even in a +2C warming scenario. Hsiang's team has analyzed the effectiveness of multilateral policies, such as lifting the UN moratorium on international trade of elephant ivory, geoengineering, and law of the sea.

=== Health ===
In a 2020 analysis, Hsiang's team calculated that mortality from climate change could exceed 2018 mortality rates for all infectious diseases worldwide. In work with Marshal Burke and coauthors, Hsiang and his team demonstrated that high temperature increase suicide rates in the United States and Mexico. Jesse Anttila-Hughes and Hsiang showed that 12% of infant mortality in the Philippines could be traced to typhoons. In 2024, Hsiang and Rachel Young showed that hurricane and tropical storm storm strikes increased death rates in US states for 15 years after landfall.

In 2020, an analysis by Hsiang and the Global Policy Lab demonstrated that non-pharmaceutical interventions were highly effective as slowing the spread of SARS-CoV-2. They calculated that by April 2020, policies prevented 495 million infections. In an interview with The Rachel Maddow Show, Hsiang stated that "[these policies] were a historic feat… that saved more lives in a shorter period than anything else in human history."

== Satellite Imagery and Machine Learning ==
In 2021 Hsiang and coauthors developed MOSAIKS (Multi-task Observation using Satellite Imagery & Kitchen Sinks), an accessible and generalizable approach to applying machine learning to satellite imagery at global scale.

== Awards ==
Hsiang received the Science for Solutions Award given by the American Geophysical Union for "significant contributions in the application and use of Earth and space sciences to solve societal problems." In 2014, he was listed by Forbes Magazine in their 30 under 30 list. He was named a Kavli Fellow at the National Academy of Sciences in 2016, an AI for Earth Innovation Fellow at Microsoft Corporation and the National Geographic Society in 2019, and an Andrew Carnegie Fellow by the Carnegie Corporation in 2020. He was awarded the President's Medal by the Geological Society of America in 2020.
