= Children's Tumor Foundation =

- Abbreviation: CTF
- Formation: 1978
- Type: Nonprofit Organization
- Location: New York City
- Key people: Annette Bakker, PhD, CEO; Gabriel Groisman, Chair
- Formerly called: National Neurofibromatosis Foundation

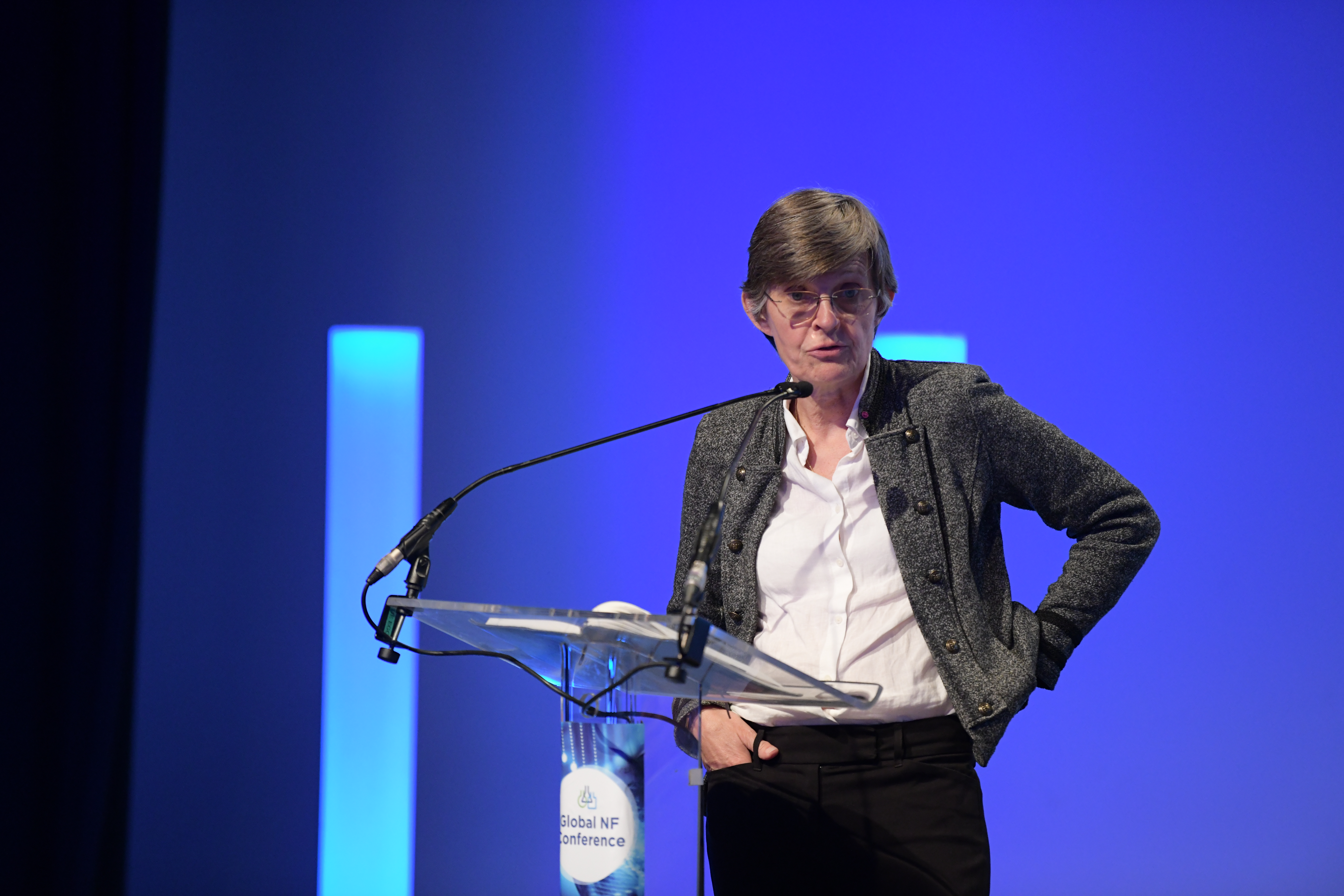
CEO Annette Bakker, PhD speaking at CTF's Global NF Conference in Brussels in 2024.

The Children's Tumor Foundation (CTF) is a U.S.-based 501(c)(3) nonprofit foundation that serves as a drug discovery engine for neurofibromatosis and schwannomatosis, collectively referred to as NF. CTF funds and coordinates research to bring treatments to patients while working toward a cure. By connecting patients, clinicians, scientists, and pharmaceutical partners, the foundation drives treatment development, advances clinical care, and supports the NF community worldwide. CTF is the largest private funder of all forms of NF research.

NF is a group of genetic conditions that cause tumors to grow on nerves throughout the body. It includes neurofibromatosis type 1 (NF1) and all types of schwannomatosis (SWN), including NF2-related schwannomatosis (NF2-SWN), formerly known as neurofibromatosis type 2 (NF2). The presentation and severity of NF vary widely; potential complications include vision or hearing loss, bone abnormalities, disfigurement, learning challenges, chronic pain, and an increased risk of certain cancers.

== History ==
Established in 1978 as the National Neurofibromatosis Foundation by Lynne Ann Courtemanche, RN, neurologist Allen E. Rubenstein, MD and Joel S. Hirschtritt, Esq., the organization changed its name to Children's Tumor Foundation in 2005. In the early years, the organization's focus was on providing patient support and organizing the NF community. From the late 1980s through the mid-1990s, their aim incorporated discovering the genes that cause NF. CTF began concentrating on translational research in 2005; in 2008 CTF also began to fund clinical trials. Under the leadership of President and Chief Scientific Officer Annette Bakker, the organization has shifted from a more traditional funding model to a funder-partner model in order to accelerate the drug discovery process.

== Notable achievements ==
The Foundation awarded its first grants in 1988, launching the first neurofibromatosis research program in the world. In 1985, they organized the NF Conference, the first major gathering of NF scientists and clinicians. In 1990 and 1993, respectively, labs funded by grants from the Foundation identified the genes for NF1 and NF2. In 1997, CTF launched an international summer camp for youth affected by NF. In 2006, the Foundation began funding a drug discovery initiative and piloted a program for a network of NF clinics. They launched a patient registry in 2012 and a specimen biobank in 2013. In 2014, the Foundation established Synodos for NF2, a first-of-its kind collaboration of NF scientists working across institutions to find a cure for NF2. A similar project, Synodos for NF1, is planned to begin in 2015.

== Funding model ==
In recent years, CTF has shifted its funding model from that of a more traditional non-profit organization to one more aligned with the venture capital approach advocated by the Milken Institute's FasterCures model. CTF now situates itself as a catalyst of NF research and has created active partnerships with patients, scientists, research institutions and both the biotechnology and pharmaceutical industries.

== Major initiatives and key investments ==
- The Young Investigator's Award (YIA): Begun in 1985, this two-year award is granted to post-doctoral and early-career scientists. It is intended to establish awardees as independent investigators. Many former awardees have become leaders in the field of NF research and within the clinical community.
- Drug Discovery Initiative (DDI): Begun in 2006, this award facilitates preclinical screenings to develop data of both in vitro and in vivo screening of NF therapeutics.
- Children's Tumor Foundation NF Clinic Network: CTF established the NF Clinic Network in 2007. This network currently includes 47 affiliate clinics throughout the United States, all of which adhere to current consensus clinical care guidelines for NF. Over 10,000 patients with NF are treated at these clinics annually.
- NF Conference: In 1985, CTF convened the first-ever scientific meeting focusing on neurofibromatosis with the goal of encouraging research and fostering collaboration in the scientific community. Held annually, it is now considered the preeminent meeting of NF scientists and clinicians worldwide.
- NF Summit: The NF Summit is the annual patient and family conference organized by the Children’s Tumor Foundation. The event brings together individuals affected by neurofibromatosis and schwannomatosis, including patients, families, researchers, clinicians, volunteers, event organizers, and patient advocates. The conference features educational sessions, networking opportunities, and community-building activities intended to provide information, support, and collaboration among those connected to NF.
- NF Preclinical Drug Screening Consortium (NFPC): The NFPC was a $4M, 4-year multi-site preclinical drug screening consortium designed to accelerate identification of candidate drug therapies and speed their progress to the clinic.
- Neurofibromatosis Therapeutic Consortium (NFTC): Launched in 2013, this collaboration with the NF Therapeutics Acceleration Program at Johns Hopkins School of Medicine is a three-year program that continues preclinical testing using animal models established during the NF Preclinical Drug Screening Consortium.
- Patient Registry: The registry's intended primary outcome is “to speed the development of promising new treatments.” It serves as a referral source for clinical trials and provides registered patients with up-to-date, personalized information about their particular manifestation(s) of NF. It currently has over 5000 registrants.
- Synodos for NF2: Launched in 2014, Synodos for NF2 is consortium of scientists from a variety of institutions who have agreed to collaborate, sharing data in real time and working together to find treatments for NF2.
- Synodos for NF1: Announced in 2014 and launching in early 2015, Synodos for NF1 is a consortium of scientists from a variety of institutions who have agreed to collaborate, sharing data in real time and working together to find treatments for NF1.

== Patient support ==
The Foundation publishes educational brochures for patients, their caregivers, and other interested parties on a variety of subjects. Many of these brochures are available in English, Spanish, and other languages. Participation in the NF Registry offers additional support to patients and their families. In addition to providing up-to-date information about applicable clinical trials, the registry allows patients and their families the opportunity to receive information targeted to their specific NF-related symptoms.

== Advocacy ==
CTF advocates on a national level for funding of neurofibromatosis research. The Foundation is considered instrumental in securing both initial and ongoing funding through the Department of Defense Congressionally Directed Medical Research Program Neurofibromatosis Research Program (CDMRP-NFRP). As a part of their efforts, CTF organizes volunteers to petition their representatives in Congress and the Senate online, by letter and in person, to urge continued and increased funding through both the CDMPR-NFRP and the National Institutes of Health.

== Fundraising programs ==
The Foundation sponsors a number of programs designed to raise money and bolster NF awareness, as well as provide a sense of community for those who live with NF. These programs include NF Endurance, NF Walk and Cupid's Undie Run, Poker Tournaments National Gala.
