= Eduard Feireisl =

Czech mathematician

Prof. RNDr. Eduard Feireisl DrSc.
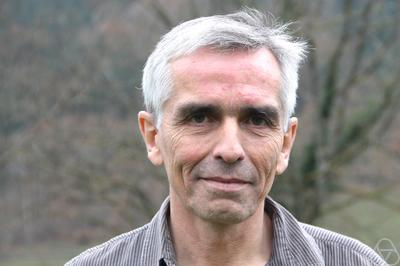
- Feireisl in 2014
- Born: December 16, 1957 (age 68); Kladno
- Occupation: Mathematician

Academic background
- Education: Charles University, Czechoslovak Academy of Sciences
- Thesis: Critical points of non-differentiable functionals: existence of solutions to problems of mathematical elasticity theory (1986)

Academic work
- Discipline: Partial differential equations, dynamical systems, hydrodynamics
- Institutions: Charles University
- Website: www.mff.cuni.cz/en/faculty/organizational-structure/people?hdl=10949

Eduard Feireisl (born 16 December 1957 in Kladno) is a Czech mathematician.

After studying from 1973 to 1977 at secondary school in Nové Strašecí, Feireisl studied mathematics at Charles University in Prague from 1977 and graduated there in 1982. He received his doctorate in 1986 from the Institute of Mathematics of the Czechoslovak Academy of Sciences with thesis Critical points of non-differentiable functionals: existence of solutions to problems of mathematical elasticity theory under the supervision of Vladimir Lovicar. During the 1980s he worked as an assistant professor at the Department of Mathematics of the Faculty of Mechanical Engineering Czech Technical University in Prague (CTU). He studied at the Institute of Mathematics of the Czechoslovak Academy of Sciences (as a member since 1988) and habilitated there in 1999. He became a lecturer at the Charles University in 2009 and was appointed there to a full professorship in 2011.

Feireisl spent in 1989 half a year in Oxford, in 1993/94 a sabbatical year at the Complutense University of Madrid, and in 1998 and in 1999 half a year at the University of Franche-Comté in Besançon. He was also as visiting scholar for 12 months from 2001 to 2013 at Henri Poincaré University in Nancy and for 3 months in 2000 at Ohio State University. He was in 2004/05 at the Technical University of Munich, from 2008 to 2010 a visiting professor at the Central European University in Budapest, and in 2012 at the Erwin Schrödinger Institute in Vienna. For 2018 to 2021 he was appointed an Einstein Visiting Fellow at TU Berlin.

His research deals with partial differential equations, infinite dimensional dynamical systems, and mathematical problems of hydrodynamics.

He received in 2004 and 2009 the Prize of the Academy of Sciences of the Czech Republic, in 2015 the Neuron Award, and in 2017 the gold medal of Charles University, as well as the Bernard Bolzano Honorary Medal from the Czech Academy of Sciences. In 2012, he chaired the scientific committee of the European Congress of Mathematicians in Krakow. He was an invited speaker in 2002 at the International Congress of Mathematicians in Beijing, and at the conference Dynamics, Equations and Applications in Kraków in 2019. In 2018 he was a member of the Fields Medal Selection Committee. In 2013 he received an Advanced Grant from the European Research Council (ERC) for the study of mathematical modeling of gas movement and heat exchange.

== Selected publications ==
=== Articles ===
- Feireisl, Eduard (1998). "Finite energy travelling waves for nonlinear damped wave equations". Quarterly of Applied Mathematics. 56 (1): 55–70. doi:10.1090/qam/1604876. ISSN 0033-569X.
- Feireisl, Eduard; Petzeltová, Hana (2002). "Global existence for a quasi-linear evolution equation with a non-convex energy". Transactions of the American Mathematical Society. 354 (4): 1421–1435. doi:10.1090/S0002-9947-01-02950-6. ISSN 0002-9947.
- Asymptotic analysis of the full Navier–Stokes–Fourier system: From compressible to incompressible fluid flows, Russian Mathematical Surveys, vol. 62, 2007, pp. 511–533 doi:10.1070/RM2007v062n03ABEH004416
- Dynamical systems approach to models in fluid mechanics, Russian Mathematical Surveys, vol. 69, 2014, pp. 331–357 doi:10.1070/RM2014v069n02ABEH004890

=== Books ===
- Dynamics of viscous compressible fluids, Oxford UP 2004
- as editor with Constantine Dafermos: Handbook of differential equations: Evolutionary equations, Elsevier 2004
- with Dalibor Pražák: Asymptotic behavior of dynamical systems in fluid mechanics, American Institute of Mathematical Sciences 2010
- with Trygve G. Karper, Milan Pokorný: Mathematical Theory of Compressible Viscous Fluids: Analysis and Numerics, Birkhäuser 2016
- with John M. Ball, Felix Otto: Mathematical thermodynamics of complex fluids : Cetraro, Italy 2015, Lecture notes in mathematics 2200, Springer 2017
- with Antonín Novotný: Singular Limits in Thermodynamics of Viscous Fluids, Birkhäuser 2017
- with Dominic Breit, Martina Hofmanová: Stochastically forced compressible fluid flows, De Gruyter 2018
