= Xin Meng =

Chinese economist

Xin Meng (Chinese: 孟昕) FASSA is a Chinese economist and professor at the Research School of Economics, College of Business and Economics (CBE), Australian National University (ANU). She is also a member of the Association for Comparative Economic Studies, the American Economic Association, the Society of Labor Economics and Royal Economic Society. Her main research interests include Labour Economics, Development Economics, Applied Microeconomics and Economics of Education. She focuses on researching issues about the Chinese labour market during transition, the influence of corporations and gender discrimination, the economic assimilation of immigrants and the economic implications of major catastrophes. Meng was elected a Fellow of the Academy of the Social Sciences in Australia in 2008.

== Education ==
In 1982, Meng graduated as a bachelor in Beijing Economics University. She then obtained her master's degree in economics from Chinese Academy of Social Sciences in 1984. Meng continued her studies in economics in ANU and received her graduate diploma in 1988 and Ph.D. in 1993.

Meng is also an editorial board member of the Journal of Labour Economics, the Industrial and Labor Relations Review and the China Economic Review.

== Rural-Urban Migration in China and Indonesia project (RUMiCI) ==
Meng is the project leader of the Rural-Urban Migration in China and Indonesia project (RUMiCI), which studies the internal migration within the two countries. The funding of the project was granted by the Ford Foundation, the Institute for the Study of Labor, the Australian Agency for International Development (AusAID), the Australian Research Council and the Chinese Academy of Social Sciences.

Meng and other researchers from the ANU, the University of Queensland and the Beijing Normal University collected four-year longitudinal surveys from urban resident households, rural households and rural-urban migrants. The research topics mainly focus on the impacts of migration on poverty alleviation, assimilation of migrant workers, education, income mobility and health and nutrition of migrant children. To date, seven waves of the survey have been conducted in China and four waves in Indonesia. The first two waves have been published in 2008 and 2009 and the rest will be published as planned. Based on the survey results from the first wave, a book called “The Great Migration” was published in May 2010 by Edward Elgar Publishing. As the project leader, Meng was interviewed by The Wall Street Journal in 2013.

China's One Child Policy was introduced in 1979 and was estimated to have reduced China's population by 400 million in 2011. In 2018 Meng was one of the authors of "Effects of China's One Child Policy on its children". The paper analysed the effect of China's one-child policy using 400 subjects and their conclusion that it had created a generation of children who lacked qualities that were important for both social and economic success. Her co-authors were Lisa Cameron and Lata Gangadharan from Monash University and Nisvan Erkal from Melbourne University.

== Select bibliography ==
=== Books ===
- 1989: Structural Change: Transfer of Chinese Rural Surplus Labour
- 2000: Labour Market Reform in China
- 2010: The Great Migration: Rural-Urban Migration in China and Indonesia

=== Articles ===
- Meng, Xin; Yamauchi, Chikako (2017-10-01). "Children of Migrants: The Cumulative Impact of Parental Migration on Children's Education and Health Outcomes in China". Demography. 54 (5): 1677–1714. doi:10.1007/s13524-017-0613-z. hdl:10419/114038. ISSN 1533-7790. PMID 28936632.
- Cameron, Lisa; Meng, Xin; Zhang, Dandan (2019). "China's Sex Ratio and Crime: Behavioural Change or Financial Necessity?". The Economic Journal. 129 (618): 790–820. doi:10.1111/ecoj.12561. hdl:11343/214144. ISSN 1468-0297.
