= Manish Shah (doctor) =

Former London medical doctor convicted of sexual assaults on female patients

Manish Shah (born 1969 or 1970) is a former general practitioner in East London. On 7 February 2020, he was handed three life sentences with a minimum term of 15 years, plus further jail terms to run concurrently, at the Old Bailey, having been convicted of 90 sexual assaults on 24 female patients. He misused his position to trick them into being unnecessarily intimately examined by him.

On Monday 9th January 2023 he received two more life sentences, after sexually assaulting 4 women during unnecessary examinations. He was found guilty December, 2022 of 25 sexual assaults at his GP clinic in Romford on the 4 women.

At the Old Bailey on Monday the further two life sentences totalling 10 years were given, to run concurrently with earlier sentences.

He is now convicted of 115 offenses of sexual assault and assault by penetration, against 28 women aged between 15 and 34 and will serve a minimum of 25 years.
