= Paul Gertler =

American economist

- Born: March 30, 1955 (age 71)

Academic background
- Education: University of Wisconsin

Academic work
- Discipline: Development economics Health economics
- Institutions: University of California, Berkeley
- Website: http://www.paulgertler.com/; Information at IDEAS / RePEc

Paul Gertler (born March 30, 1955) is an American economist and the Li Ka Shing Distinguished Professor of Economics in the Haas School of Business and the School of Public Health at UC Berkeley.

Gertler is considered an early pioneer in the randomized evaluation of social programs in developing countries. He co-led the impact evaluation of the Mexican government welfare program Oportunidades, as well as the Rwandan government's roll-out of results-based financing for health. As Chief Economist for the World Bank Human Development Network (2004–2006), he helped to establish a culture of rigorous impact evaluation.

He is the author of the best selling textbook Impact Evaluation in Practice. He is a co-founder and Scientific Director of the Center for Effective Global Action at the University of California. He previously served as the chairman of the Board of Commissioners for 3ie, the International Initiative for Impact Evaluation.
