= Center for Effective Global Action =

The Center for Effective Global Action (CEGA), earlier known as the Center of Evaluation for Global Action, is a research network based at the University of California, Berkeley that advances global health and development through impact evaluation and economic analysis. The Center's researchers use randomized controlled trials and other rigorous forms of evaluation to promote sustainable social and economic development around the world.

== History and Mission ==
CEGA was established in 2008 by Economics Professor Edward Miguel, Temina Madon, and colleagues at UC Berkeley. The Center's founders, including Haas School of Business Professor Paul Gertler, are considered pioneers in the field of impact evaluation. They have led some of the most influential field experiments in recent years, including evaluations of school-based deworming in Kenya and of the Oportunidades program in Mexico.

The Center is guided by the principle that economic policy and social programs should be based on scientific evidence. In support of this vision, CEGA researchers rigorously test anti-poverty strategies and disseminate their findings to governments and other decision-makers. The Center also invests in developing junior researchers in the U.S. and in low- and middle-income countries.

CEGA is currently led by Faculty Director Edward Miguel and Executive Director Carson Christiano.

== Activities ==
CEGA focuses its resources in three core areas: research, training and policy impact.

The Center's research program draws on the empirical work of more than 170 faculty members at the University of California, Stanford University, and other West Coast academic institutions. These researchers employ statistical tools to measure the impacts of social programs in low- and middle-income countries. The CEGA toolbox includes randomized evaluation as well as regression discontinuity, panel analysis, instrumental variables, and other quasi-experimental methods. When used appropriately, each of these methods can create equivalent treatment and comparison groups for use in estimating an intervention's impact.

CEGA is unique among development research centers, in that it integrates business and economic approaches with expertise from various sectors—including agriculture, engineering and computer science, public health, education, political science, research transparency, and environment. It also maintains investments in cultivating research collaborators in developing countries through programs like the East Africa Social Science Translation (EASST) Collaborative.

== Policy impact ==
To transform research into better policies and programs, CEGA encourages the scale-up of proven interventions. For example, CEGA researcher Edward Miguel, in collaboration with Michael Kremer, demonstrated in 2004 that school-based mass deworming in rural Kenya is a cost-effective way to improve school attendance. Subsequent advocacy by Kremer and Miguel led to the establishment of Deworm the World, a non-profit that works directly with governments to expand school-based deworming. The efforts of Deworm the World, together with Miguel's and Kremer's research, have been instrumental in the creation of Kenya's national deworming program. In 2009, the program reached more than 3.6 million children at 8,200 schools across the country, making it one of the first evidence-based, national deworming programs in sub-Saharan Africa.

Miguel's research on deworming has been covered by The New York Times, as well as The Boston Globe, Chicago Tribune and Financial Times. In May 2011, Miguel's and Kremer's work was featured in a column by Nicholas Kristof on the importance of impact evaluation.

== Partners ==
CEGA partners with governments, foundations and non-profit organizations to implement impact evaluations, trainings and research dissemination. In each of these areas, the Center works closely with the Abdul Latif Jameel Poverty Action Lab at the Massachusetts Institute of Technology and Innovations for Poverty Action. CEGA and J-PAL jointly manage the Agricultural Technology Adoption Initiative, an initiative that seeks to improve the appropriate adoption of agricultural technologies by small-scale farmers in sub-Saharan Africa and South Asia.
