= Fishman =

Fishman may refer to:

- Fishman (company)
- Fishman (surname)
- Fishman (wrestler) (1951–2017), ring name of luchador José Nájera
- Fish-man, in Spanish mythology
- Fishman (The Legend of Zelda), a character in the Zelda video game The Wind Waker
- Fish-Men, a fictional race of humans in One Piece

== See also ==
- Fishmans, a Japanese dub band
