= Lyn Parker =

Australian social and cultural anthropologist

Lynette Parker FASSA
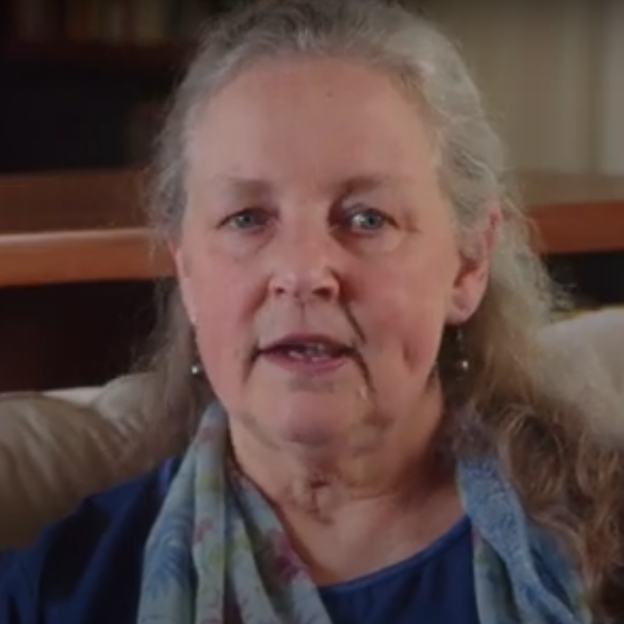
- Education: Australian National University
- Occupation: Emerita Professor of Anthropology
- Known for: study of the people of indonesia

Lynette Parker is an Australian social and cultural anthropologist. She is an Emerita Professor and an elected fellow of the Academy of the Social Sciences in Australia. She has studied contemporary Indonesia and in particular Bali.

== Life ==
Parker took her first degree in Asian Studies and her doctorate at the Australian National University before undertaking post doctoral research in Indonesia while employed by that university's Research School of Asian and Pacific Studies. Her work in Indonesia focussed on the island of Bali where she looked at education, gender issues and fertility. She moved to the University of Western Australia where she was a lecturer in their school of Asian Studies.

In 1989 she published her thesis concerning the village of Brassika in southern Bali as it was absorbed into the nation of Indonesia. The thesis looked at the changing ownership of land and changes brought about by the Land Reform Act of 1960 and the 1965 Gestapu coup created by the 30 September Movement.

Parker's work has been concerned with gender but she notes that the Western ideal of women striving for autonomy is not suited to Indonesian culture.

Parker was interested in improving the education of environmental education in Indonesia. She and her pre-doctoral students have been writing in the media, writing articles and books to encourage the study of the environment. Parker was consulted when the first university environmental program was being established in Indonesia.

Parker lead a team who published several studies and the book Creating Multicultural Citizens: A Portrayal of Contemporary Indonesian Education in 2013.

In 2021 she was elected a Fellow of the Academy of the Social Sciences in Australia.
