= Raymond Fisman =

American economist

Raymond John Fisman (born January 29, 1971) is a Canadian-American economist who is the Slater Family Professor in Behavioral Economics at Boston University. In August 2026, the Rotman School of Management at the University of Toronto announced that Fisman would join the school as a professor of finance on July 1, 2027, and serve as the Eddie Goldenberg Research Chair of Canada in Finance and Political Economy.

== Career ==
Before joining Boston University, Fisman was the Lambert Family Professor of Social Enterprise and co-director of the Social Enterprise Program at Columbia Business School.

His research focuses on political economy and finance. His work has appeared in journals including the American Economic Review, Journal of Political Economy, Quarterly Journal of Economics, and Journal of Financial Economics.
