= Bureau for Research and Economic Analysis of Development =

Professional association

The Bureau for Research and Economic Analysis of Development (BREAD) is a professional association founded in 2002 to encourage research and scholarship in development economics. The association organizes conferences and seminars, disseminates a working paper series, and maintains a network of fellows and affiliates. The current presidents are Pascaline Dupas and Imran Rasul.

== Conferences ==
BREAD organizes and co-organizes conferences on the microeconomics of development, including the annual BREAD Conference on Development Economics. Recent editions have been hosted by the University of Michigan, the Global Poverty Research Lab at Northwestern University, and the Development Research Institute at New York University. BREAD has also co-hosted conferences and seminar series with organizations such as the National Bureau of Economic Research, Institute for Fiscal Studies, and Centre for Economic Policy Research.

== Notable members ==
=== Senior fellows ===
- Esther Duflo
- Abhijit Banerjee
- Michael Kremer
- Edward Miguel
- David McKenzie
- Rema Hanna
- Rohini Pande
- Pascaline Dupas
- Oeindrila Dube
- Erica Field
- Rachel Glennerster
- Karthik Muralidharan
- Seema Jayachandran
- Christopher Udry
- Dean Karlan
- Tavneet Suri
- Oriana Bandiera
- James A. Robinson
- Lant Pritchett
- Paul Gertler
- Dani Rodrik
- Dave Donaldson
- Tim Besley
- Robin Burgess
- Nava Ashraf
- Pranab Bardhan
- Chris Blattman
- Melissa Dell
- Imran Rasul
- Benjamin Olken
- Pinelopi Koujianou Goldberg
- Marcel Fafchamps

=== Affiliates ===
- Emily Oster
- Johannes Haushofer
- Benjamin Moll
- Dina Pomeranz
- Suresh Naidu
- Hoyt Bleakley
