= Consortium on Financial Systems and Poverty =

US research consortium

Coordinates: 41°47′19.1″N 87°35′40.2″W

Consortium on Financial Services and Poverty
- Type: Private research organization
- Founded: March 2009
- Headquarters: Chicago, Illinois
- Key people: Robert M. Townsend, Juliano Assuncao, Abhijit Banerjee, Francisco Buera, Douglas Diamond, Weerachart Kilenthong, Gabriel de Abreu Madeira, Roberto Rigobon, Kenneth Singleton, Tavneet Suri, Christopher Udry, Christopher Woodruff
- Services: Financial systems and poverty
- Owner: mainly Robert M. Townsend
- Website: Official website

The Consortium on Financial Systems and Poverty (CFSP) is a private economic research consortium dedicated to studying the interaction of financial systems and poverty, using a variety of economic approaches in a range of developing countries.

The CFSP was established in 2009 by a grant to the University of Chicago from the Bill and Melinda Gates Foundation, with Robert M. Townsend (MIT) as Principal Investigator, and economists Juliano Assuncao (PUC-Rio), Abhijit Banerjee (MIT), Francisco Buera (UCLA), Douglas Diamond (Booth School of Business), Weerachart Kilenthong (University of the Thai Chamber of Commerce), Gabriel de Abreu Madeira (University of São Paulo), Roberto Rigobon (MIT Sloan School of Management), Kenneth Singleton (Stanford), Tavneet Suri (MIT), Christopher Udry (Northwestern University), Christopher Woodruff (UCSD) as members.

The CFSP shares members with several other organizations that work in development economics, including the Abdul Latif Jameel Poverty Action Lab, the Financial Access Initiative, and Innovations for Poverty Action. In contrast to these organizations, however, which tend to focus on rigorous randomized evaluations to generate policy recommendations, the CFSP attempts to connect traditional approaches in developmental economics to a wider range of approaches and models, including general equilibrium models applied to both macro and regional financial systems.
