= Rema Hanna =

- Occupations: Economist and professor
- Website: https://scholar.harvard.edu/remahanna

Rema Hanna is an economist and is the Jeffrey Cheah Professor of South East Asia Studies at Harvard University's Kennedy School of Government. Moreover, she currently serves as co-director of the Evidence for Policy Design (EPoD) research programme at Harvard's Center for International Development and a scientific co-director for Southeast Asia at the Abdul Latif Jameel Poverty Action Lab (J-PAL). Her research focuses on the efficiency and effectiveness of public services in developing countries, with specific focus on service delivery and the impacts of corruption. She is also the co-chair of the editorial board for the academic journal Review of Economics and Statistics.

== Biography ==
Rema Hanna earned a B.S. in policy analysis from Cornell University in 1999 and a Ph.D. in economics from the Massachusetts Institute of Technology in 2005. After graduating, she became an assistant professor in New York University's Wagner School of Public Service and its Department of Economics (2005–08). In 2009, Hanna moved to Harvard University's Kennedy School of Government as junior faculty, where she was promoted to Jeffrey Cheah Professor of South East Asia Studies in 2016. In parallel, she has held visiting appointments at Columbia University (2011) and the University of Zurich 2015. Moreover, Hanna has served as co-director of Harvard University's Evidence for Policy Design programme and as scientific co-director for Southeast Asia at J-PAL since 2012. Additionally, she maintains affiliations with NBER, CEPR, IZA, and BREAD and edits the Review of Economics and Statistics, American Economic Journal: Applied Economics, and the Journal of Human Resources.

== Research ==
According to IDEAS/RePEc, Rema Hanna currently (February 2018) belongs to the top 5% of most cited economists. Most of her research is located in public economics, often with a focus on Asia. Key findings of her research include:

- Monitoring teachers in India and linking their salaries to attendance was effective in decreasing teacher absenteeism by 21%, which in turn increased students' test scores by 0.17 standard deviations, suggesting that teachers' labour supply in developing countries may respond strongly to financial incentives (with Esther Duflo and Stephen P. Ryan;
- Relative to proxy means tests (PMT), which use households' assets to predict consumption and assess, community-based targeting methods, wherein the community (or its leaders) identify poor households, and a hybrid of PMT and community-based methods are found to be only slightly less effective in targeting Indonesian households living in absolute poverty, with community-based methods resulting in higher satisfaction, possibly because of the application of community-specific definitions of poverty (with Vivi Alatas, Abhijit Banerjee, Benjamin Olken and Julia Tobias);
- Pollution's impact on health may negatively affect labour supply, as the closure of a large refinery in Mexico City reduced sulfur dioxide pollution in surrounding neighbourhoods by 19.7%, which in turn increased weekly work hours by 3.5% (with Paulina Oliva).
