= Oeindrila Dube =

Economist and political scientist

- Education: Stanford University (BA); University of Oxford (MPhil); Harvard University (PhD)
- Awards: Rhodes Scholarship
- Scientific career
- Fields: Economics; Political Science
- Workplaces: University of Chicago
- Thesis: Essays in the Political Economy of Conflict and Development (2009)
- Doctoral advisor: Sendhil Mullainathan; Lawrence F. Katz; Rohini Pande; Dani Rodrik

Oeindrila Dube is an economist and political scientist serving as the Philip K. Pearson Professor of Global Conflict Studies at the University of Chicago, Harris School of Public Policy. She is a faculty research fellow at the National Bureau of Economic Research and co-director of the Crime, Violence, and Conflict Initiative at the Abdul Latif Jameel Poverty Action Lab. Her research examines the political economy of conflict and development, with a regional focus on Africa and Latin America.

== Biography ==
Dube received her BA in Public Policy from Stanford University, MPhil in Economics from the University of Oxford, and PhD in Public Policy from Harvard University. At Harvard, she was a student of Sendhil Mullainathan, Rohini Pande, Lawrence Katz, and Dani Rodrik. In 2002, she received a Rhodes Scholarship.

After completing her PhD, Dube joined the Center for Global Development as a post-doctoral fellow, followed by New York University as an assistant professor. From 2013 to 2014, she was a National Fellow at Stanford University's Hoover Institution.

In 2016, she moved to the University of Chicago, where she now occupies the Philip K. Pearson Professorship of Global Conflict Studies.

Dube is affiliated with several research institutes, including the National Bureau of Economic Research and Centre for Economic Policy Research. She has held editorial positions at the Review of Economics and Statistics and Journal of Development Economics, and co-directs the J-PAL Crime, Violence, and Conflict Initiative with Chris Blattman. In 2021, she joined the advisory board of the United Nations Human Development Report.

Dube is the sister of labor economist Arindrajit Dube. She is married to Dan Godsel, former commander of the Chicago Police Department Training Academy.

== Research ==
Dube's research examines the political economy of conflict and development, particularly in Africa and Latin America. Her work leverages both experimental and quasi-experimental research designs.

=== Crime and violence ===
Dube's early work examined the causes and consequences of gang and paramilitary violence in Latin America. In a paper in the American Political Science Review, Dube shows that the expiration of the U.S. Federal Assault Weapons Ban in 2004 increased homicides and gun seizures in Mexican municipalities close to border states without strong state gun laws. Her work has been cited in Congressional testimony on the effects of federal assault weapons bans.

Dube has also pursued research on drug trafficking. In work with Suresh Naidu on Colombia, Dube shows that increases in U.S. military aid decreased anti-narcotics operations by Colombian operatives, increased the prevalence of paramilitary attacks near U.S. military bases, and had no effect on the production of coca.

=== Pandemic response ===
Another line of Dube's work concerns pandemic response, particularly as it pertains to trust in medicine. Through a randomized controlled trial in Sierra Leone, Dube and co-authors show that health clinics exposed to a community monitoring scheme before the onset of the 2014 West African Ebola crisis saw more positive cases but fewer deaths in response to the disease. The results suggest that the intervention improved trust in medical institutions, encouraging and de-stigmatizing testing.

Based on her work on Ebola, Dube published several New York Times pieces on optimal individual responses to the COVID-19 pandemic, including an article leveraging anonymized cellphone location data to assess the relative risks of visiting particular retail establishments.

=== Female leadership ===
Dube has also pursued research on conflict in historical perspective. In a paper co-authored with S.P. Harish, Dube shows that European states ruled by queens between 1480 and 1913 were 27% more likely to go to war than their male counterparts, with results especially strong for leaders without husbands, or whose husbands did not hold a position of coregency. She also finds that women are more likely to gain new territory.
