= Abdul Latif Jameel Poverty Action Lab =

Global research center working to reduce poverty

Abdul Latif Jameel Poverty Action Lab (J-PAL)
- Abbreviation: J-PAL
- Founded: 2003; 23 years ago
- Founder: Esther Duflo; Abhijit Banerjee; Sendhil Mullainathan
- Type: Research institute
- Purpose: Economic research, poverty alleviation
- Headquarters: Cambridge, Massachusetts, U.S.
- Coordinates: 42°21′45″N 71°5′16″W
- Region served: Worldwide
- Method: Randomized controlled trials
- Directors: Esther Duflo; Abhijit Banerjee; Benjamin Olken
- Affiliations: Massachusetts Institute of Technology (MIT)
- Employees: 400+
- Website: www.povertyactionlab.org
- Formerly called: Jameel Poverty Action Lab

The Abdul Latif Jameel Poverty Action Lab (J-PAL) is a global research center based at the Massachusetts Institute of Technology aimed to reducing poverty by ensuring that policy is informed by rigorous, scientific evidence. J-PAL funds, provides technical support to, and disseminates the results of randomized controlled trials evaluating the efficacy of social interventions in health, education, agriculture, and a range of other fields. As of 2020, the J-PAL network consisted of 500 researchers and 400 staff, and the organization's programs had impacted over 400 million people globally. The organization has regional offices in seven countries around the world, and is headquartered near the Massachusetts Institute of Technology in Cambridge, Massachusetts.

In 2019, the Nobel Memorial Prize in Economic Sciences was jointly awarded to J-PAL co-founders Esther Duflo and Abhijit Banerjee, alongside economist Michael Kremer, "for their experimental approach to alleviating global poverty". The Nobel committee highlighted Duflo and Banerjee's work building J-PAL in their report on the scientific background for the award, noting that the organization was "vital" in promoting the acceptance of randomized controlled trials as an empirical technique in development economics. Nicholas Kristof of The New York Times has described J-PAL as leading a "revolution in evaluation".

== History ==
J-PAL was founded in 2003 as the "Poverty Action Lab" by Abhijit Banerjee, Esther Duflo, and Sendhil Mullainathan, all of the economics department at the Massachusetts Institute of Technology. Initial funding for the research center was approved by MIT economics department chair Bengt Holmström in an effort to convince Duflo and her colleagues to stay in the department despite outside opportunities. The research center was early on championed by MIT president Susan Hockfield, who promoted it to MIT's pool of donors. In 2005, it was endowed by Mohammed Jameel of Saudi Arabia's Abdul Latif Jameel Corporation, and renamed the "Abdul Latif Jameel Poverty Action Lab (J-PAL)". Subsequently, J-PAL has also received financial support from the Bill & Melinda Gates Foundation, Open Philanthropy, Good Ventures, and USAID's Development Innovation Ventures.

In 2004, Rachel Glennerster, a British economist and the wife of 2019 Nobel Prize co-laureate Michael Kremer, became executive director of J-PAL. She held the role until 2017, when she became chief economist of the United Kingdom's Department for International Development. In 2018, Iqbal Dhaliwal, a former Indian Administrative Service officer and the husband of former IMF chief economist Gita Gopinath, became J-PAL's new global executive director. Dhaliwal sits on J-PAL's executive committee, which also includes Duflo, Banerjee, Amy Finkelstein, Rema Hanna, Kelsey Jack, Benjamin Olken, and Tavneet Suri.

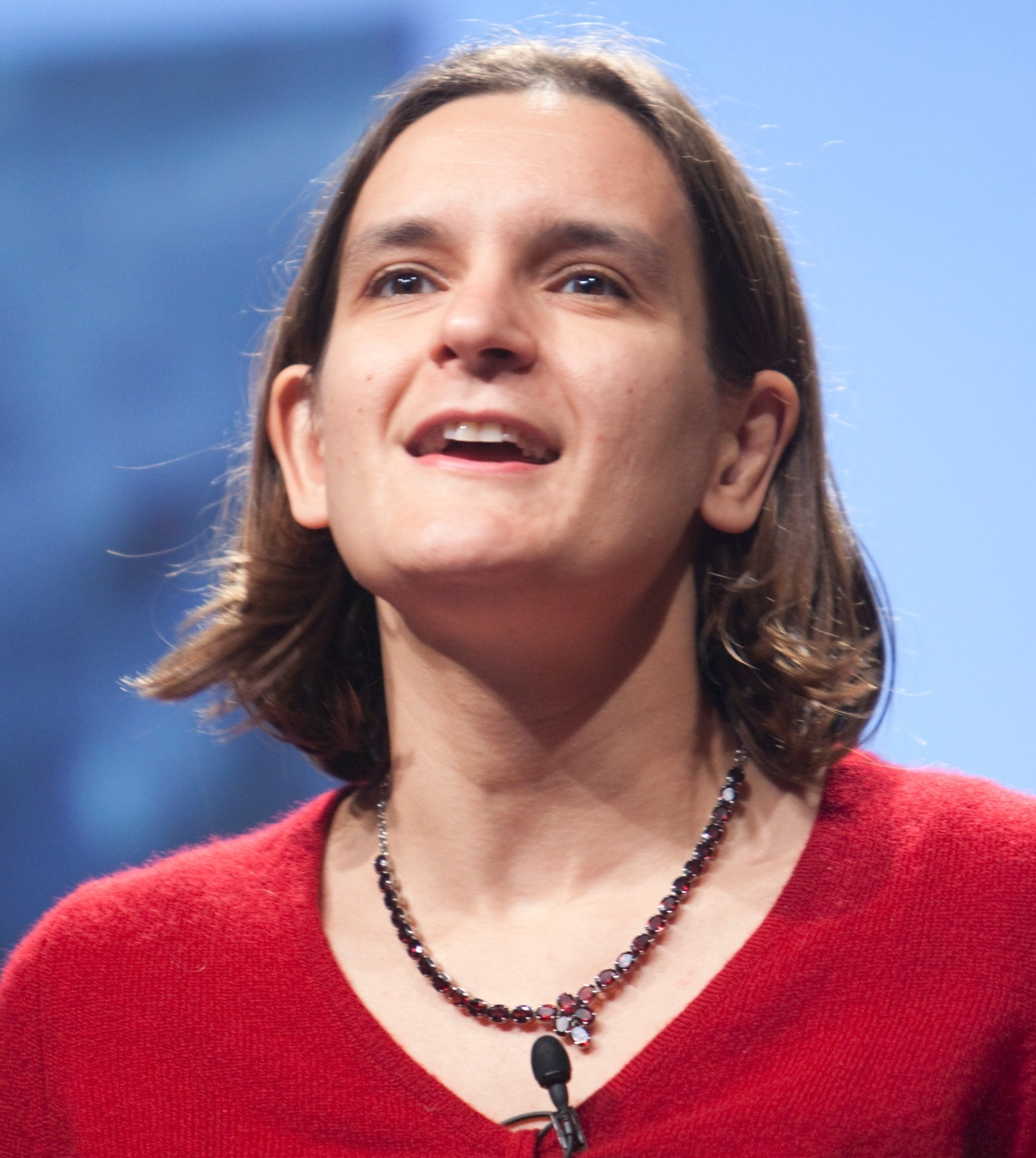
Esther Duflo, J-PAL Co-Founder, MIT Professor, 2019 Nobel Prize Laureate

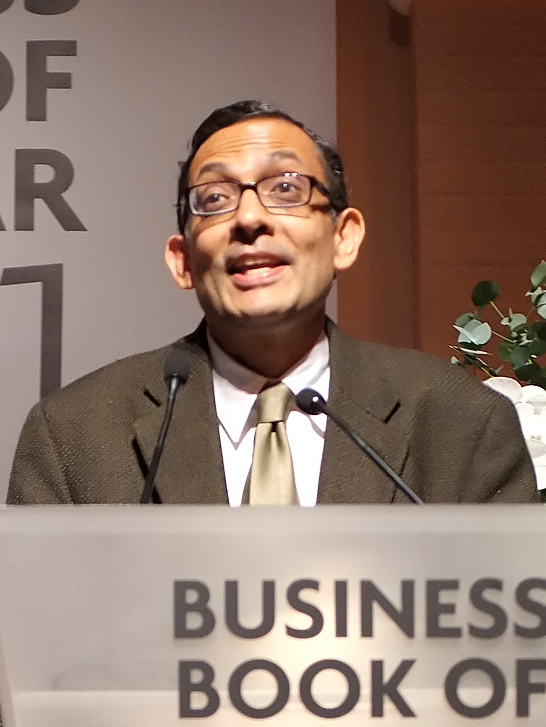
Abhijit Banerjee, J-PAL Co-Founder, MIT Professor, 2019 Nobel Prize Laureate

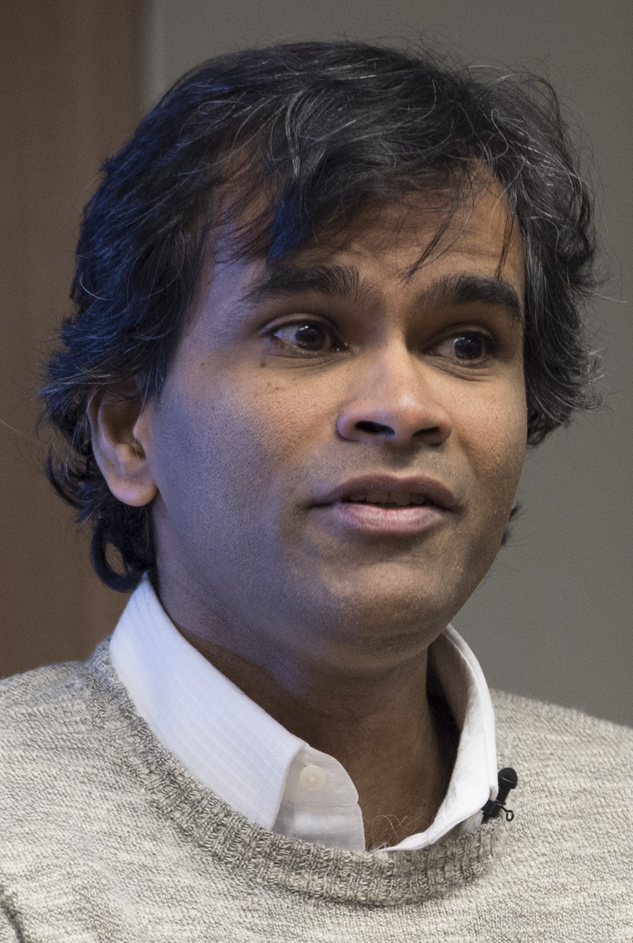
Sendhil Mullainathan, J-PAL Co-Founder, MIT Professor

J-PAL opened its first regional office in 2007 at the Institute for Financial Management and Research in Chennai, Tamil Nadu. N. R. Narayana Murthy, co-founder of Infosys, was the keynote speaker at the launch event. In line with J-PAL's initial focus on South Asia, Many of Duflo and Banerjee's first successful randomized impact evaluations were situated in India. For example, among Duflo's earliest papers is an evaluation of a program in which one third of Village Council head positions in India are randomly reserved for women. The paper finds that councils led by women invest more in roads and drinking water, public goods that they find women are relatively more likely to complain about in formal requests to Gram panchayats. To support work of affiliates in other regions of the world, J-PAL subsequently opened additional hubs in South Africa, Chile, Indonesia, Egypt, France, and the United States, each affiliated with a local university.

In 2011, Duflo and Banerjee promoted the work of J-PAL in their best-selling book Poor Economics: A Radical Rethinking of the Way to Fight Global Poverty, which won the Financial Times Business Book of the Year Award the same year. The Economist praised the book for exemplifying "a more evidence-based approach to development economics", and recommended it as one of the five best texts to read to understand the escape from extreme poverty. William Easterly, a professor of economics at NYU and longstanding critic of foreign aid, wrote in the Wall Street Journal of the book that "[Duflo and Banerjee] have fought to establish a beachhead of honesty and rigor about evidence, evaluation and complexity in an aid world that would prefer to stick to glossy brochures and celebrity photo-ops. For this they deserve to be congratulated—and to be read."

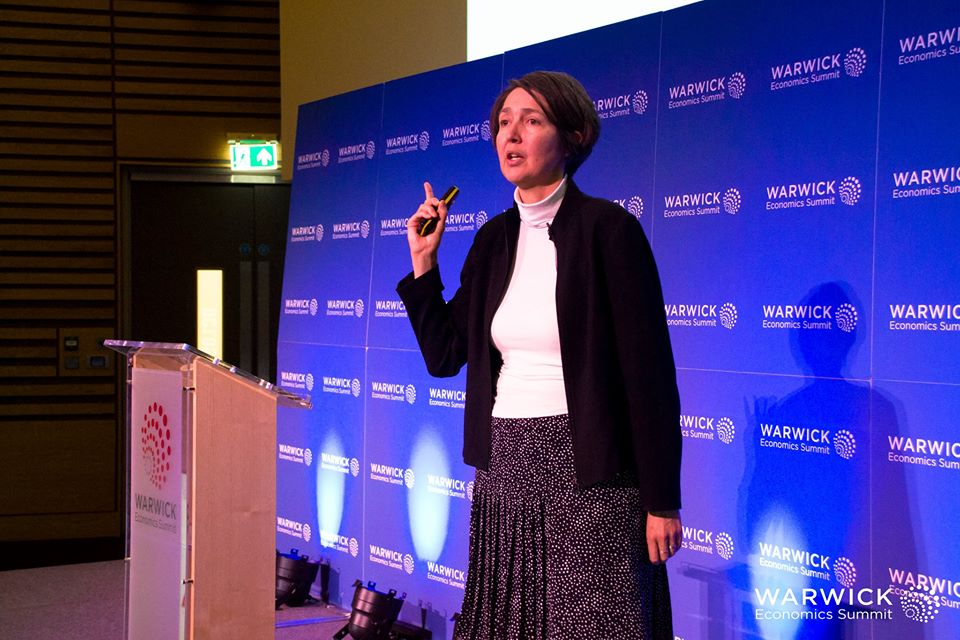
Rachel Glennerster, J-PAL affiliate and former global executive director

Throughout its history, J-PAL has been a vocal advocate of research transparency, supporting efforts to improve the quality of evidence from randomized controlled trials and ensure results are reproducible. For example, in 2012, J-PAL partnered with the American Economic Association to create a registration service for randomized controlled trials, allowing researchers to pre-register what analysis they hope to conduct before data is collected. This helps to reduce p-hacking, ensuring researchers do not iteratively test many versions of their hypotheses, selecting only those that yield the most desirable results. J-PAL affiliates Rachel Glennerster and Edward Miguel published one of the earliest and highest profile studies to use a "pre-analysis plan", showing that pre-registration effectively prevented them from drawing erroneous conclusions.

In 2019, Duflo and Banerjee were selected as the co-recipients of the Nobel Memorial Prize in Economic Sciences, alongside Michael Kremer, then of Harvard University. In their report on the scientific background for the award, the Nobel committee explicitly acknowledged Duflo and Banerjee's work building J-PAL, noting that the organization "has promoted research built on randomized controlled trials in many countries and promoted the acceptance of results from such trials in the economic-policy community."

J-PAL's success has inspired the widespread acceptance of randomized controlled trials in development economics, and has encouraged their use in organizations and by academics outside their network. At approximately the same time as J-PAL was created, Dean Karlan founded Innovations for Poverty Action, an NGO and longstanding partner of J-PAL that also promotes the use of rigorous impact evaluation in development economics. In 2008, Edward Miguel, a development economist and co-author of 2019 Nobel Prize co-laureate Michael Kremer, founded the Center for Effective Global Action at UC Berkeley to pursue a similar goal. J-PAL's success has also inspired successful impact evaluations at multilateral development agencies such as the World Bank and Inter-American Development Bank, in addition to within national governments such as that of Indonesia. In line with qualitative accounts of J-PAL's influence in popularizing experimental research methods, a paper by Janet Currie and co-authors in the papers and proceedings of the American Economic Association observed that the share of NBER working papers leveraging randomized controlled trials increased from less than 5% to almost 15% between 1980 and 2018.

== Activities ==
Although J-PAL was founded as a research center, its activities encompass three primary areas: field research, policy outreach, and capacity building. Its activities are supervised by a staff of over 400 spread across its global headquarters in Cambridge, Massachusetts and seven regional offices around the world.

=== Field research ===
J-PAL's primary purpose is to ensure that policies aimed at reducing poverty are informed by rigorous scientific evidence. As part of this mission, it supports randomized controlled trials by distributing grants, hiring and managing survey enumerators, and disseminating information on sampling, randomization, and other stages of the research process. In line with these efforts, J-PAL has established a set of norms and research standards for randomized controlled trials, encouraging the pre-registration of hypotheses using services such as the American Economic Association RCT Registry, back-checks and other efforts to ensure the reliability of survey data, and the timely release of anonymized data after research is published. J-PAL identifies and targets a number of primary research areas and topics in its work, organizing each under a particular "initiative" with its own funding stream. Several examples are discussed in detail below.

==== Agricultural Technology Adaption Initiative ====
One of J-PAL's primary research initiatives is the Agricultural Technology Adaption Initiative (ATAI), co-led with the Center for Effective Global Action at the University of California, Berkeley. ATAI supports randomized controlled trials evaluating interventions aimed at reducing poverty by increasing agricultural productivity. In the last ten years, the initiative has conducted over 50 evaluations across 17 countries. In line with its efforts to improve agricultural productivity, ATAI has funded randomized controlled trials evaluating the use of text messages to deliver tailored agricultural extension services to small-scale farmers in Kenya and the Indian state of Gujarat. The evaluations found that mobile extension services substantially increase the likelihood that farmers adopt recommended agricultural strategies, raising yields in a cost effective manner. In response, Michael Kremer and others founded Precision Agriculture for Development, an NGO that delivers tailored agricultural advice to small-scale farmers in the developing world.

==== King Climate Action Initiative ====
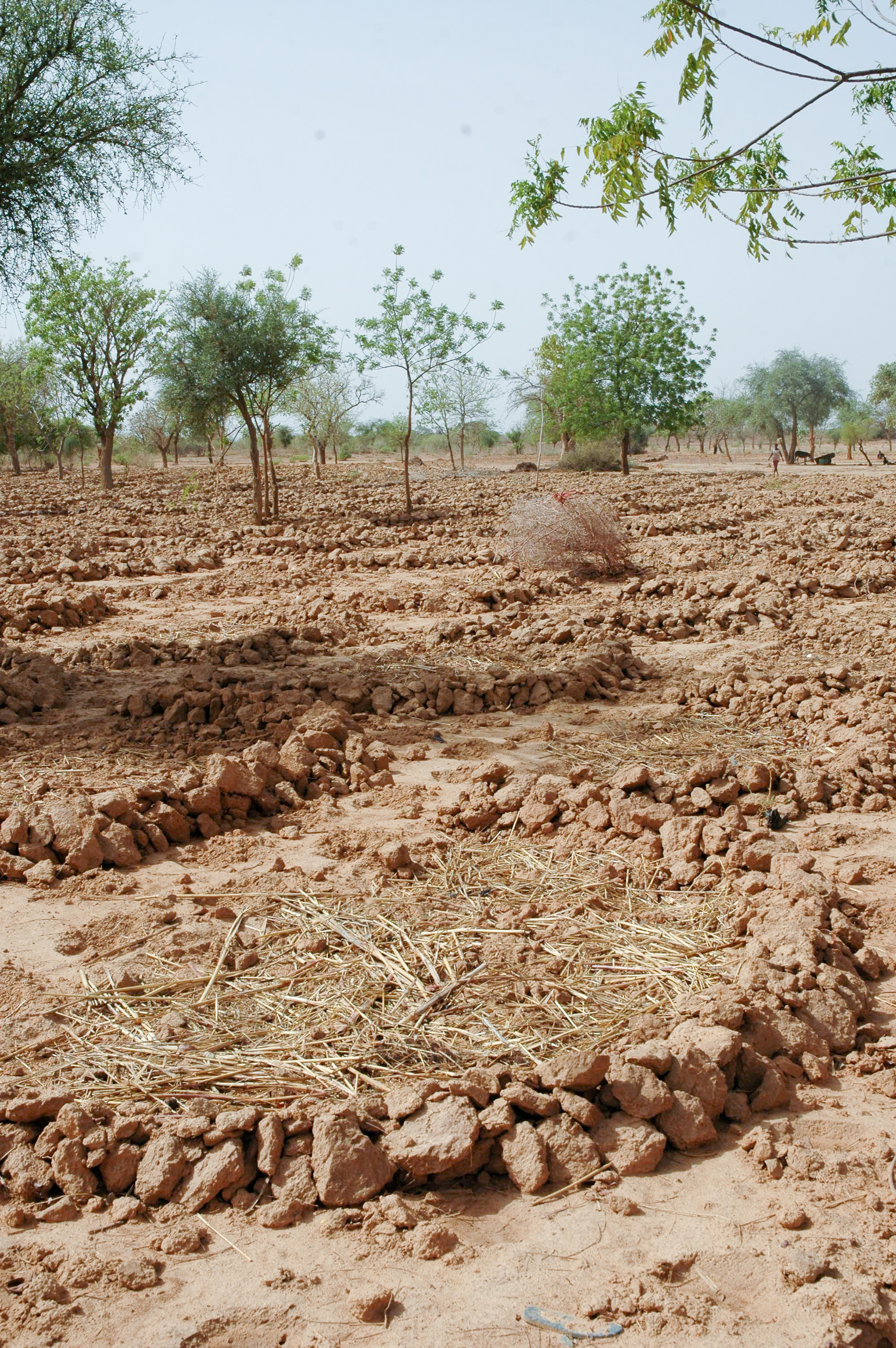
Example of a demi-lune in Burkina Faso

In 2020, J-PAL launched the King Climate Action Initiative, a research program aimed at testing policies in relation to climate change mitigation and adaption, pollution reduction, and access to energy. The initiative was supported by a $25 million founding grant from King Philanthropies. As of April 2024, the initiative had supported 30 randomized evaluations and informed the implementation of policies impacting 15 million people. In one example randomized controlled trial, J-PAL affiliaties Jenny Aker and Kelsey Jack evaluate a training program teaching farmers in Niger to harvest rainwater by digging demilunes (or semicircular bunds), combatting desertification of agricultural lands. They find that the training scheme increased adoption from 4 to 94 percent, raising yields and revenue.

==== Social Protection Initiative ====
J-PAL also co-leads a Social Protection Initiative in collaboration with the Center for International Development at the Harvard Kennedy School of Government. The initiative is co-led by Rema Hanna and Benjamin Olken, and supports randomized controlled trials examining social protection schemes in low and middle income countries.

==== Science for Progress Initiative ====
In November 2022, J-PAL launched an additional division, its Science for Progress Initiative, under the leadership of Heidi Williams and Paul Niehaus, of Dartmouth College and the University of California, San Diego, respectively. The initiative funds and helps design randomized impact evaluations aimed at finding policies that catalyze the rate of scientific progress. The initiative is supported by a $650,000 grant from Open Philanthropy, a charitable organization that distributes grants based on the principles of effective altruism.

=== Capacity building ===
J-PAL also promotes the use of scientific evidence in public policy by running trainings and distributing materials aimed at improving the capacity of researchers and governments to conduct evaluations and use them to make decisions. One example is a MicroMasters program offered in conjunction by J-PAL and MIT in "Data, Economics and Design of Policy". The MicroMasters program has over 1,000 alumni, and qualifies its recipients to apply for a Master's degree at MIT. It focuses on topics in economics, statistics, and mathematics, and also includes practical content of the design and implementation of randomized evaluations. Instructors in the program include Esther Duflo, Abhijit Banerjee, Rachel Glennerster, Jonathan Gruber, and David Autor.

J-PAL also conducts tailored trainings with policymakers in governments, non-governmental organizations, charitable foundations, and multilateral development banks. For example, the organization has conducted tailored in-person trainings with organizations and agencies such as UNICEF, the European Commission, and the Indian Administrative Service. In 2024, it announced a partnership with the government of Côte d'Ivoire and the French Development Agency to equip civil servants with training in impact evaluation and the use of evidence in policy. Between 2003 and 2020, J-PAL's training initiatives reached a total of 8,500 participants.

== Structure ==
J-PAL is headquartered in Cambridge, Massachusetts and affiliated with the economics department of the Massachusetts Institute of Technology. It is currently co-directed by Esther Duflo, Abhijit Banerjee, and Benjamin Olken, all of whom are economics professors at MIT. J-PAL's global office is supplemented by seven regional offices that support the organization's work across their respective regions of the world. Each regional office is affiliated with a local university:

- J-PAL Europe (Paris, France), established in 2007 with the Paris School of Economics
- J-PAL South Asia (Chennai, India), established in 2007 with the Institute for Financial Management and Research
- J-PAL Latin America and Caribbean (Santiago, Chile), established in 2009 with the Pontifícia Universidad Católica
- J-PAL Africa (Cape Town, South Africa), established in 2011 with the University of Cape Town at SALDRU
- J-PAL Southeast Asia (Jakarta, Indonesia), based at the Institute for Economic and Social Research within the Faculty of Economics at the University of Indonesia (LPEM FEB-UI)
- J-PAL North America (Cambridge, Massachusetts), established in 2013 with the Massachusetts Institute of Technology

J-PAL is organized both by these regional offices and by research themes called sector programs. Programs are led by members of the organization's board of directors, and cover eight areas:

- Agriculture
- Crime
- Education
- Energy and Environment
- Finance
- Health
- Labor Markets
- Political Economy & Governance

J-PAL is currently led by Professors Abhijit Banerjee, Esther Duflo and Ben Olken as Faculty Directors and Iqbal Dhaliwal as the Global Executive Director. J-PAL's Board of Directors sets the vision and strategy for the organization and includes the Global Directors and executive director, Regional Scientific Directors and executive directors, and Chairs of the Sector Programs. In 2019, J-PAL co-founders Abhijit Banerjee and Esther Duflo, and long time research affiliate Michael Kremer were awarded the Nobel prize in economics "for their experimental approach to alleviating global poverty."

== Notable research ==
J-PAL affiliates have published several randomized controlled trials that have received substantial media coverage or had outsized policy influence. Listed below are several prominent examples.

=== Teaching at the right level ===
Among J-PAL's earliest successful experiments was its evaluation of "Teaching at the Right Level", a remedial education scheme developed by Indian NGO Pratham aimed at bridging learning gaps in developing countries by evaluating students based on ability, and teaching them in groups based on these skills rather than grade level or other characteristics. Pratham's approach was developed in the early 2000s, and the first "proof of concept" trial of its efficacy was published by Abhijit Banerjee, Esther Duflo, and co-authors in 2007. The trial found that the program substantially increased standardized test scores in mathematics and language skills. A second evaluation of the program was published in 2010, revealing similar results, albeit with substantial implementation issues such as low take-up of the scheme and attrition by volunteers.

"Teaching at the Right Level" programs have subsequently been scaled in a number of countries around the world, such as India, Zambia, Kenya, and Nigeria. The scale-up of the scheme has been supported by Teaching at the Right Level Africa, a non-profit organization that as of 2022 had directly or indirectly supported programs impacting over 4 million children across Sub-Saharan Africa. The Teaching at the Right Level approach has been encouraged by organizations such as UNICEF as an effective method for bridging achievement gaps between high and low performing students.

J-PAL has also supported research evaluating the usefulness of technological assistance in aiding student-tailored instruction. For example, a paper by J-PAL affiliates Karthik Muralidharan, Alejandro Ganiman, and Abhijeet Singh evaluates an after-school program in India in which students spend time on Mindspark, an Edtech platform that algorithmically suggests remedial exercises based on performance on exam questions. The research finds that even short periods of time enrolled in the program have large positive effects on math and Hindi test scores. A review of similar randomized controlled trials by J-PAL affiliates Philip Oreopoulos and Andre Nickow finds that software-aided instruction almost always yields better results than teaching conducted through conventional means.

=== Microfinance ===
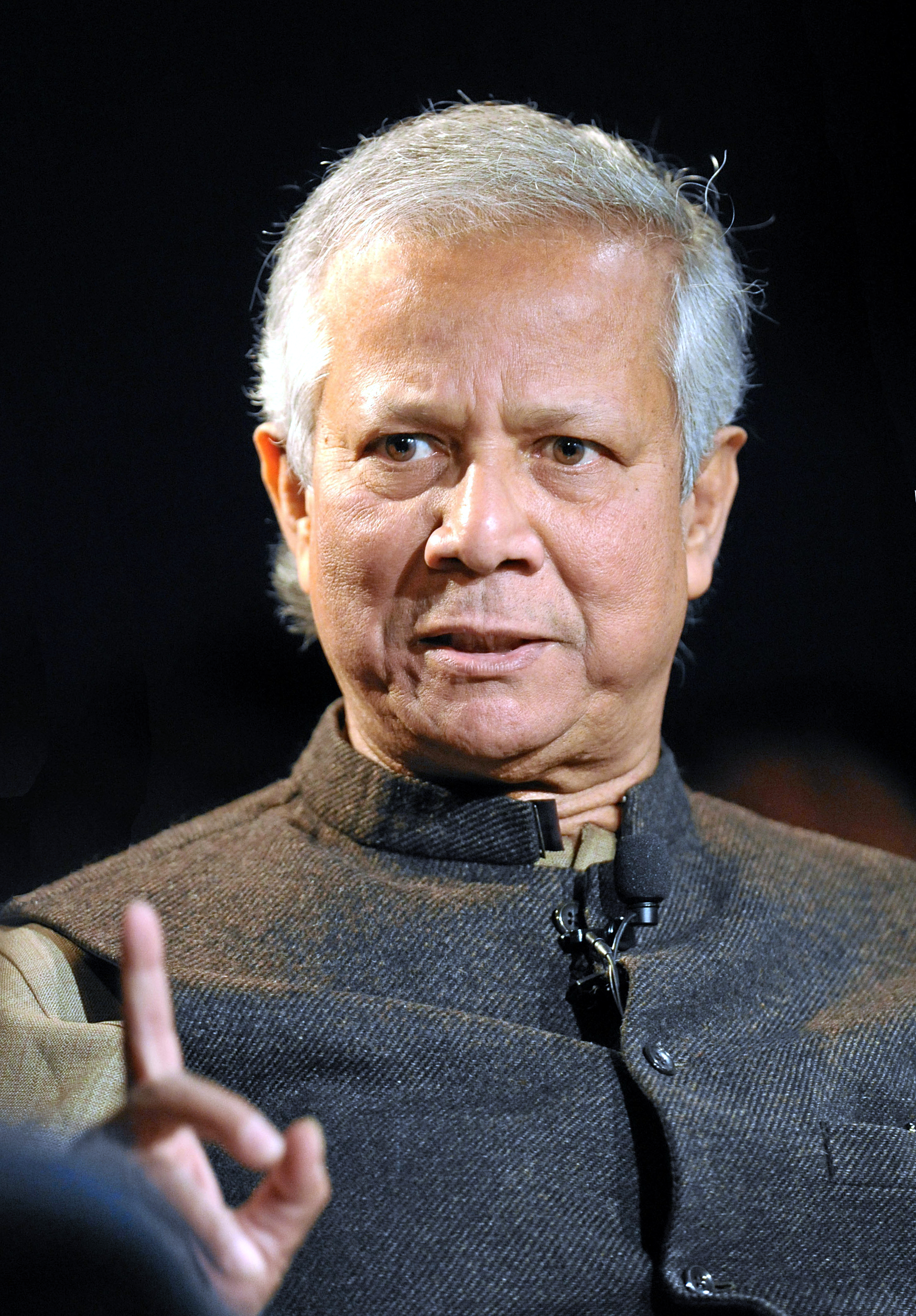
Muhammad Yunus, microfinance pioneer, at the World Economic Forum 2012

One of J-PAL's most influential lines of research was its experimental evaluations of microfinance programs aimed at alleviating poverty by providing the extreme poor access to loans without collateral or credit histories. Microfinance rose to prominence in the 1990s, culminating in a Nobel Peace Prize for Bangladeshi NGO Grameen Bank and its founder, Muhammad Yunus, in 2006. Beginning in 2005, Banerjee, Duflo, Rachel Glennerster, and Cynthia Kinnan partnered with the Indian NGO Spandana to deliver loans of approximately $250 to poor women in the city of Hyderabad. With funding and support from J-PAL, the researchers tracked participating women for three years, finding no effects of the program on measures of educational attainment, health, or female empowerment. Several follow on studies conducted by J-PAL affiliates in different geographic contexts have yielded similar results, providing limited systematic evidence that microfinance has a transformative impact on recipient's lives. The research has prompted a relative decrease in the popularity of microfinance versus cash transfers and other social interventions shown in rigorous impact evaluations to have strong positive effects.

=== Medical debt ===
Between 2018 and 2020, J-PAL supported a large-scale randomized controlled trial evaluating the effects of relieving medical debt on mental and financial health. The study was conducted by Neale Mahoney, Raymond Kluender, Francis Wong, and Wesley Yin in partnership with RIP Medical Debt, a nonprofit organization. Between 2018 and 2020, the organization randomly allocated $169 million in debt relief across 83,400 people, allowing the researchers to evaluate the causal effects of the program. The study found that medical debt relief had surprisingly muted effects on financial and mental health, with only marginal improvements in credit scores. The experiment also found that debt relief increased the prevalence of depression, likely because the relief elicited shame or reminded respondents of other unclaimed debts. The results of the study contradicted the expectations of experts polled prior to the release of its results, in addition to previously collected survey responses that indicated medical debt had detrimental effects for their mental health.

== Awards and recognition ==
Since its founding, J-PAL has been recognized as a leading research institute in development economics. Nicholas Kristof of The New York Times has written that J-PAL is leading a "revolution in evaluation", and Bill Gates has noted that the organization's work is "tremendously important" towards the goal of making international aid more effective over time. In 2010, Foreign Policy ranked J-PAL co-founders Esther Duflo and Sendhil Mullainathan among their "Top 100 Global Thinkers", writing of Duflo that "[h]er pathbreaking research aims to put hard numbers behind such [i.e. aid allocation] decisions, identifying the most cost-effective ways to fight endemic problems such as poverty and malnutrition." In 2011, Duflo and Banerjee's bestselling book Poor Economics was awarded the Financial Times Business Book of the Year Award.

=== John Bates Clark Medal ===
In 2010, Esther Duflo was awarded the John Bates Clark Medal, a prize granted annually by the American Economic Association to "that American economist under the age of forty who is judged to have made the most significant contribution to economic thought and knowledge." The prize explicitly noted Duflo's work building J-PAL, observing that "she has played a major role in setting a new agenda for the field of Development Economics" through her "research, mentoring of young scholars, and role in helping to direct the Abdul Latif Jameel Poverty Action Lab at MIT."

=== Nobel Memorial Prize in Economics ===
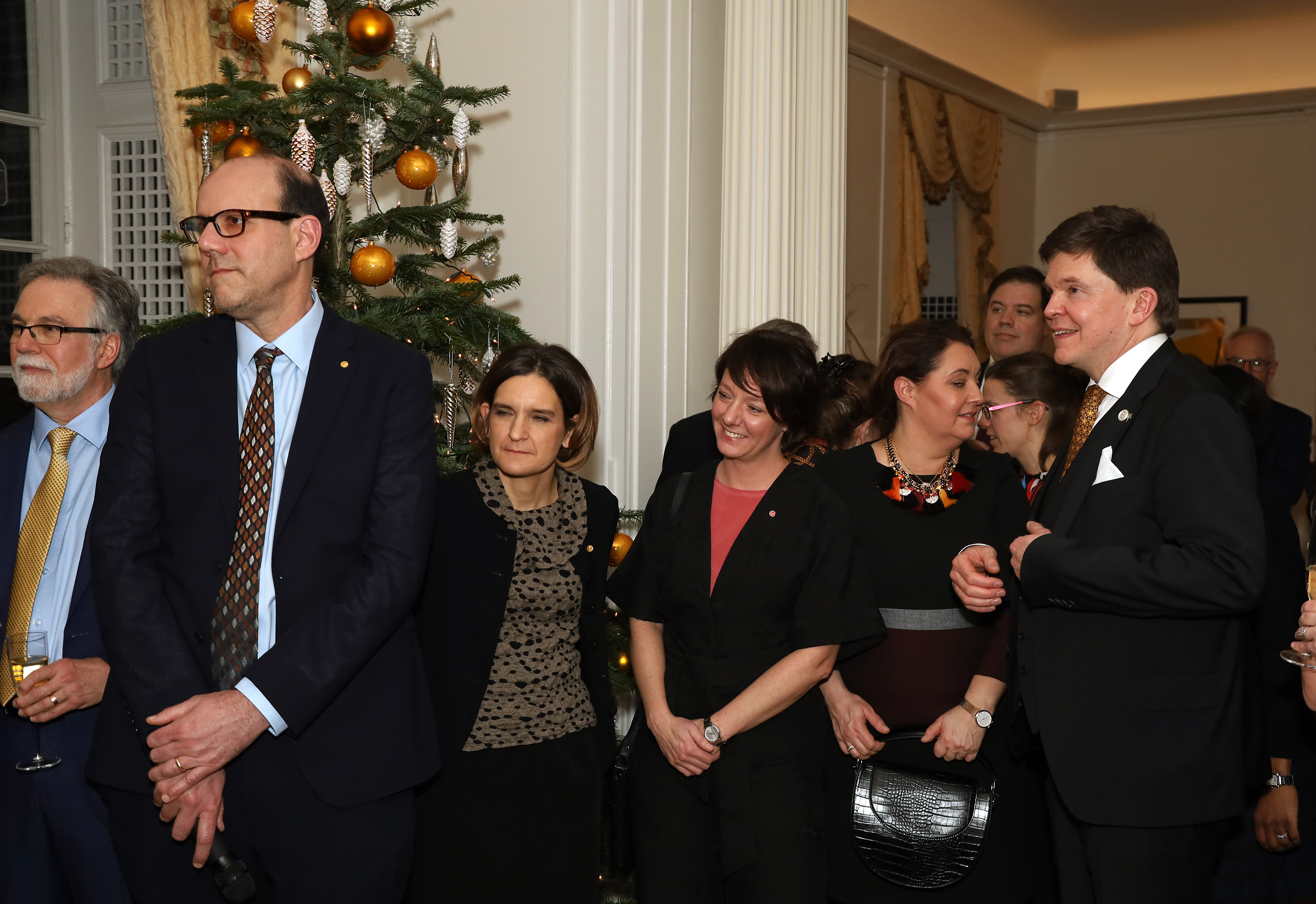
Esther Duflo and Michael Kremer receiving the Nobel Memorial Prize in Economic Sciences, 2019

In 2019, J-PAL co-founders Esther Duflo and Abhijit Banerjee were selected as the co-recipients of the Nobel Memorial Prize in Economic Sciences alongside Michael Kremer, then of Harvard University. The award was granted for Duflo, Banerjee, and Kremer's "experimental approach to alleviating global poverty." The Nobel committee highlighted J-PAL explicitly in the scientific background for the award, observing that the organization "has promoted research built on randomized controlled trials in many countries and promoted the acceptance of results from such trials in the economic-policy community." The scientific background for the award also cited the work of Innovations for Poverty Action and the Center for Effective Global Action, J-PAL partners, in furthering the movement towards evidence-based development policy. Duflo was the second female and youngest ever recipient of the Nobel Memorial Prize, winning at the age of 46.

Lawrence F. Katz, a professor of economics at Harvard University, observed after Duflo, Banerjee, and Kremer's Nobel was "probably the first 21st-century prize in economics...This is not stuff worked on 20, 30 years ago — this is stuff that, none of it started until the 2000s." Benjamin Olken, a colleague of Duflo and Banerjee's at the Massachusetts Institute of Technology, noted of Duflo, Banerjee, and Kremer's work popularizing randomized controlled trials that the "approach has been tremendously influential in reshaping the field of development economics."

=== Other awards won by J-PAL affiliates ===
==== Infosys Prize ====
- Abhijit Banerjee, 2009, "in recognition of his outstanding contributions to the economic theory of development, and for his pioneering work in the empirical evaluation of public policy"
- Esther Duflo, 2014, "in recognition of her pioneering and prodigious contributions to development economics, with important implications for policies pertaining to the delivery of services to the poor"
- Sendhil Mullainathan, 2018, for his "substantial impact on diverse fields such as development, public finance, corporate governance and policy design"
- Rohini Pande, 2022, "for her outstanding research on subjects of key importance, including governance and accountability, women's empowerment, the role of credit in the lives of the poor, and the environment"

==== Yrjö Jahnsson Award ====
- Oriana Bandiera and Imran Rasul, 2019, "for their work on the role of social relationships in economics, advanced through pioneering field experiments in the workplace and social networks"

==== Elaine Bennett Research Prize ====
- Esther Duflo, 2002
- Erica Field, 2010

== Notable affiliates ==
=== Board of Directors ===
- Abhijit Banerjee
- Marianne Bertrand
- Chris Blattman
- Emily Breza
- Oeindrila Dube
- Esther Duflo
- Pascaline Dupas
- Amy Finkelstein
- Rachel Glennerster
- Rema Hanna
- Seema Jayachandran
- Karthik Muralidharan
- Benjamin Olken
- Philip Oreopoulos
- Rohini Pande
- Tavneet Suri

=== Other Affiliates ===
- Marcella Alsan
- Nava Ashraf
- Oriana Bandiera
- Robin Burgess
- Raj Chetty
- Stefano DellaVigna
- Stefan Dercon
- Marcel Fafchamps
- Erica Field
- Paul Gertler
- Johannes Haushofer
- Lawrence Katz
- Michael Kremer
- John A. List
- Costas Meghir
- Edward Miguel
- Mushfiq Mobarak
- Sendhil Mullainathan
- Dina Pomeranz
- Imran Rasul
- Elisabeth Sadoulet
- Manisha Shah
- Christopher Udry
- Heidi Williams
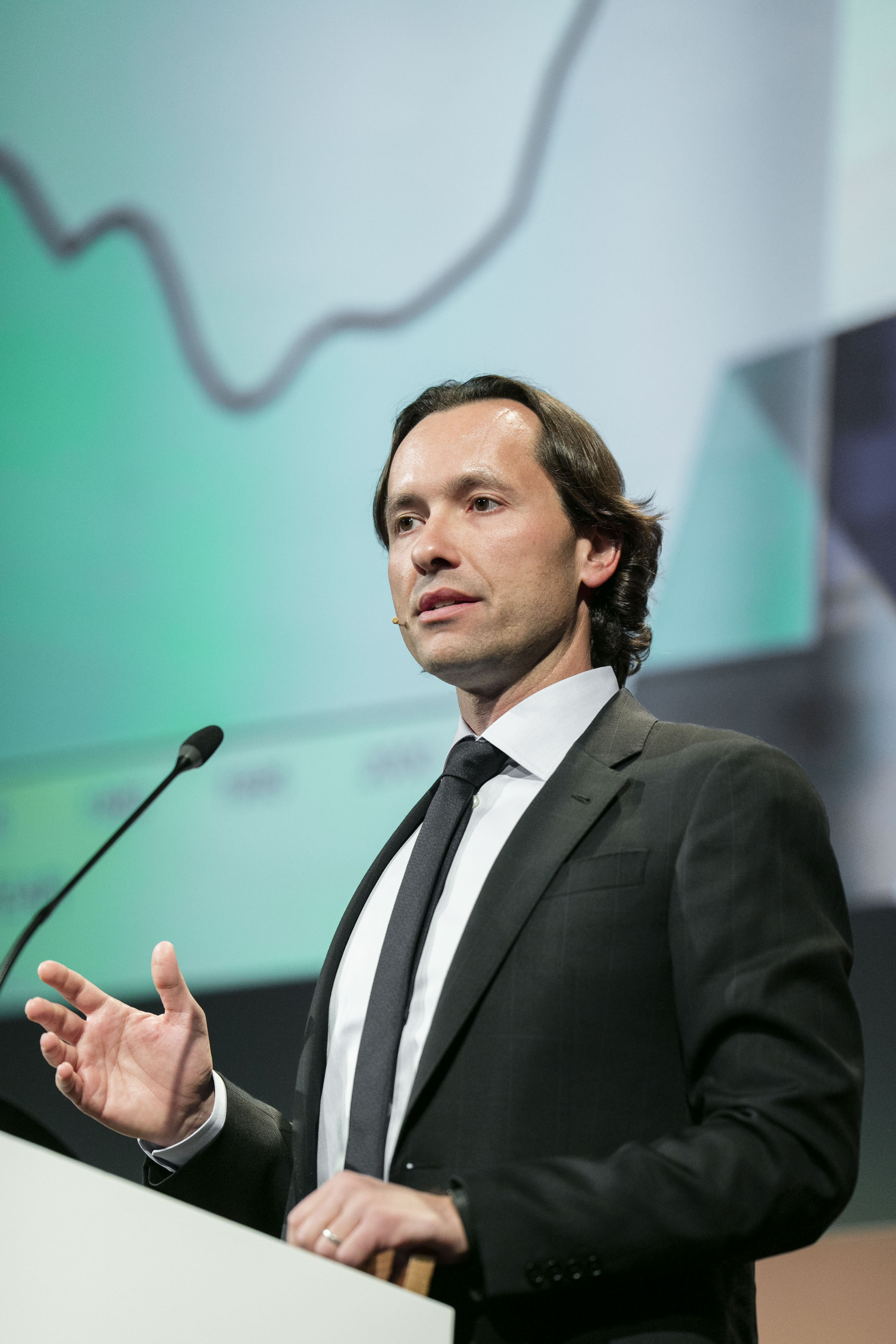
Edward Miguel

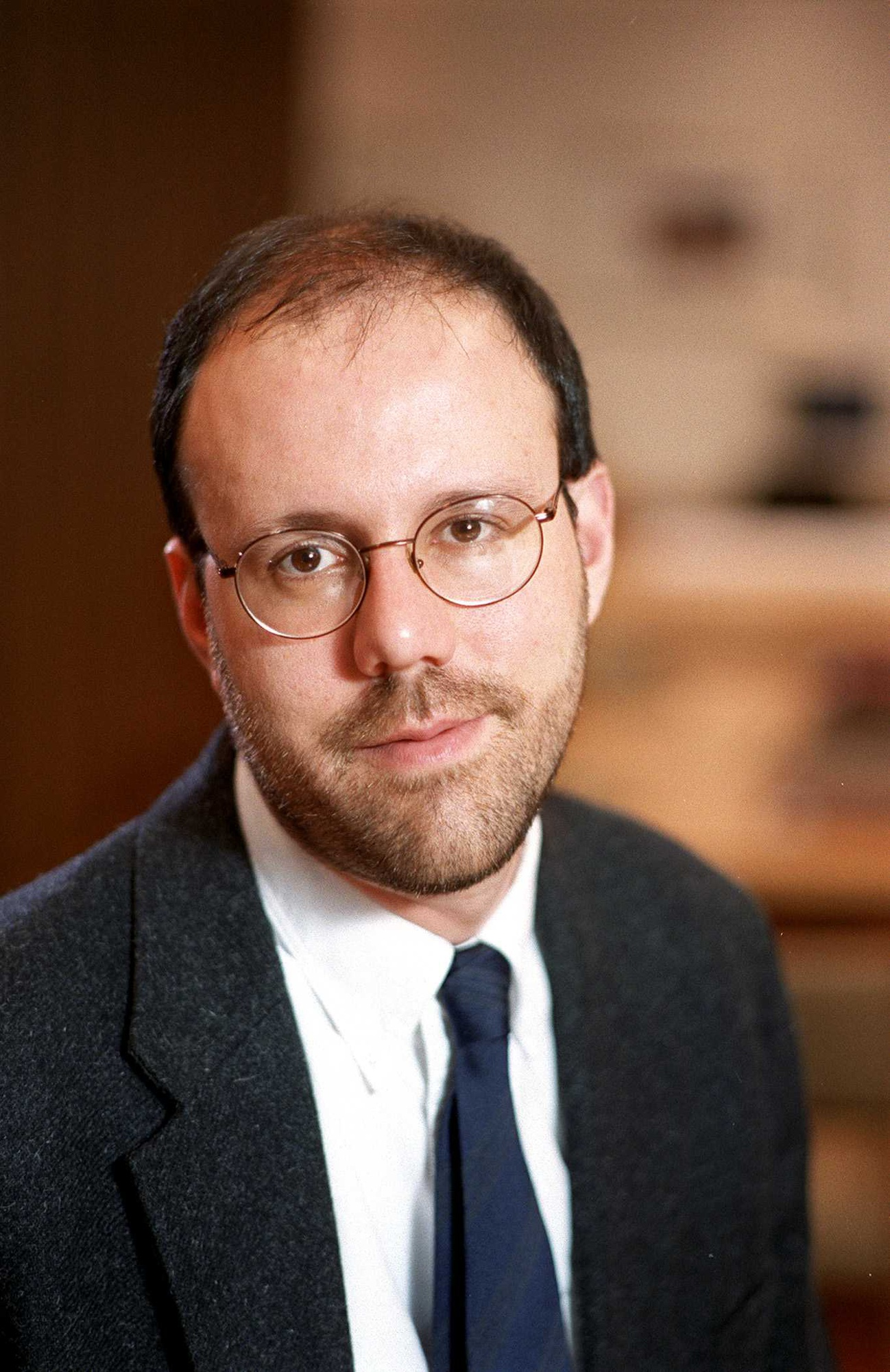
Michael Kremer

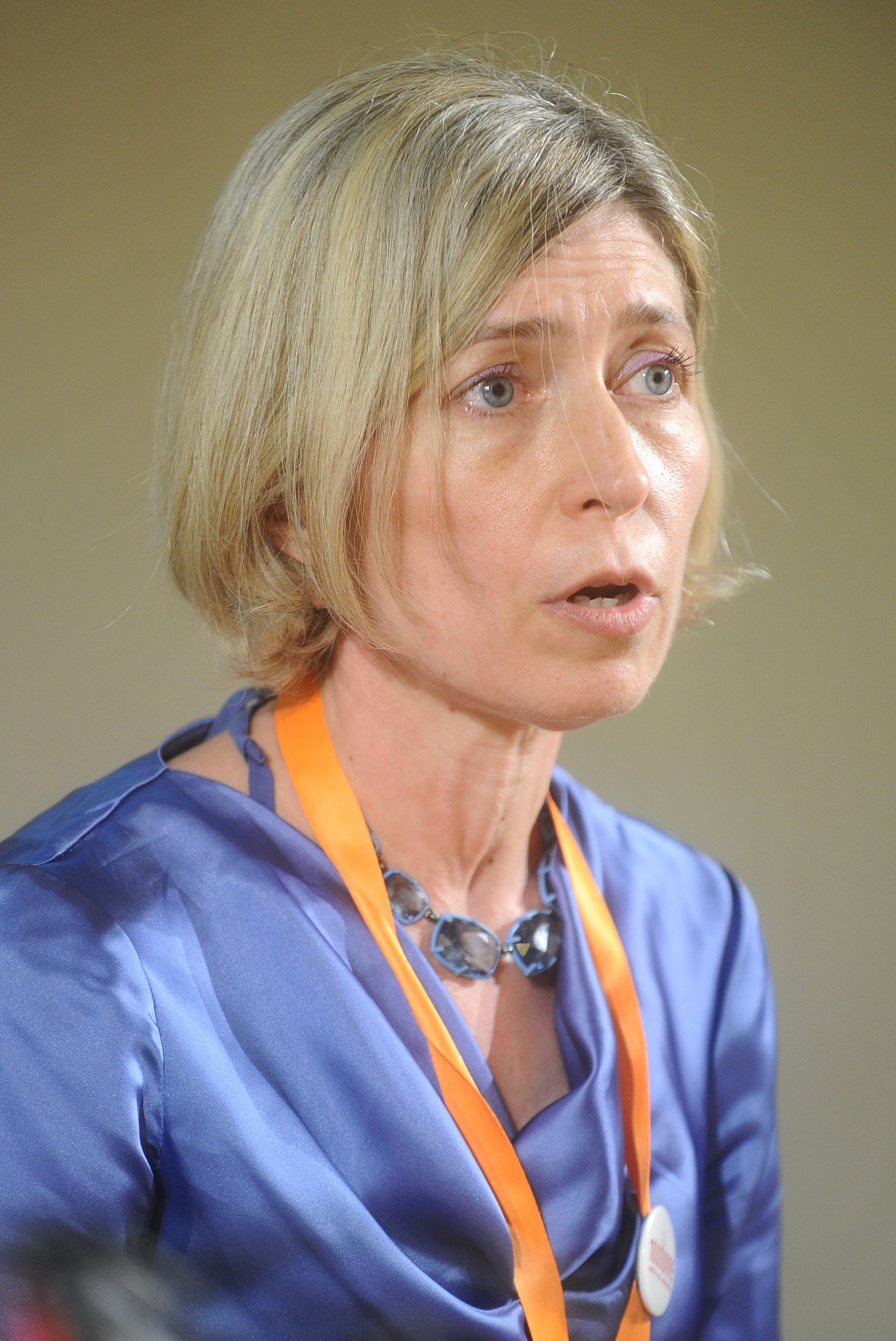
Oriana Bandiera

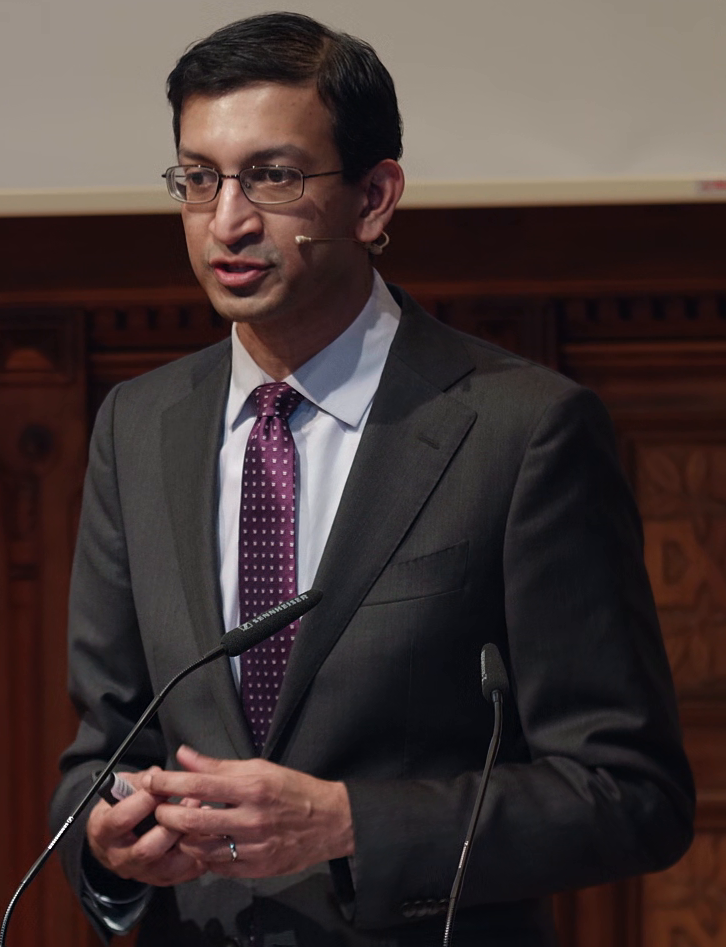
Raj Chetty

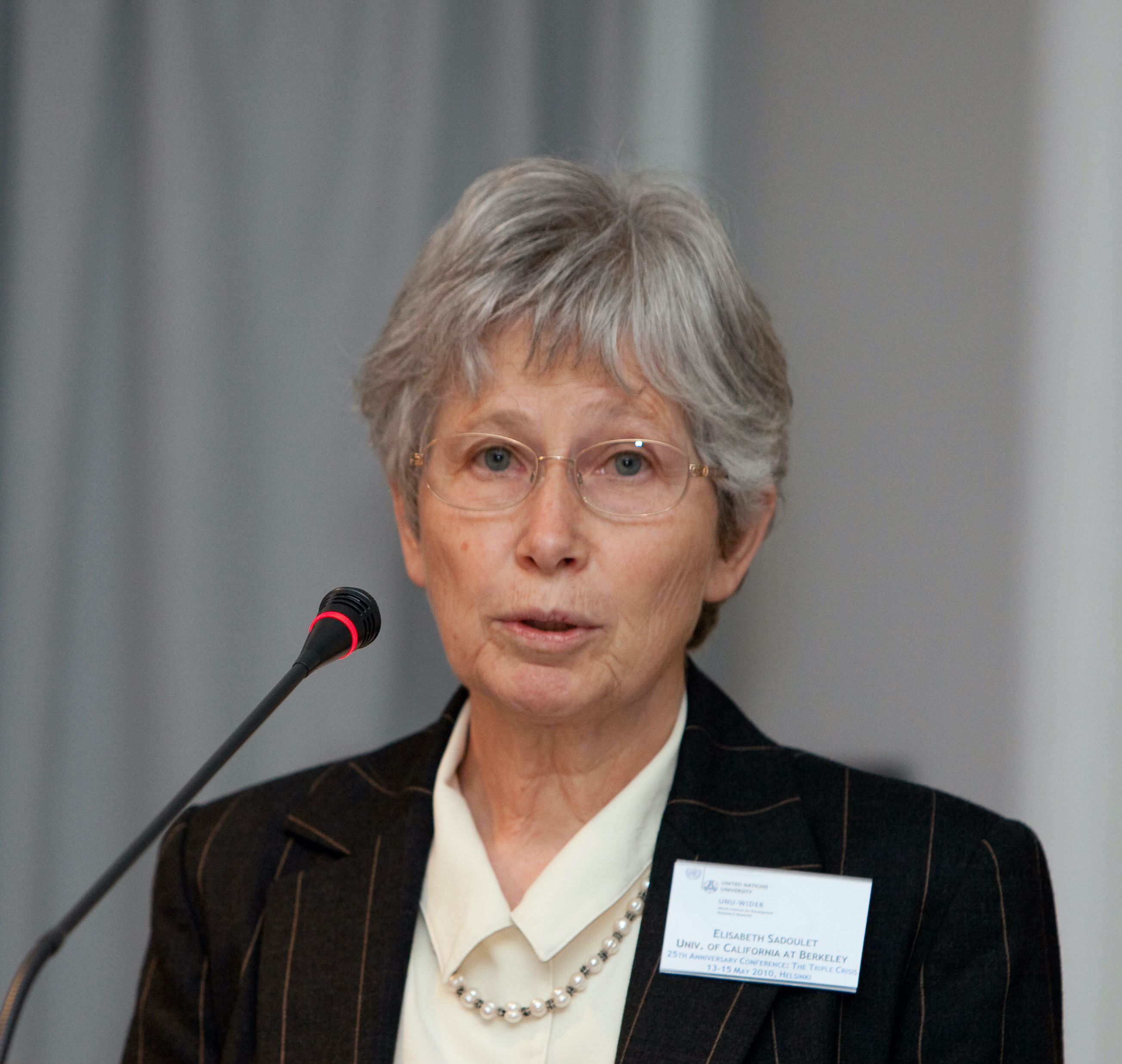
Elisabeth Sadoulet

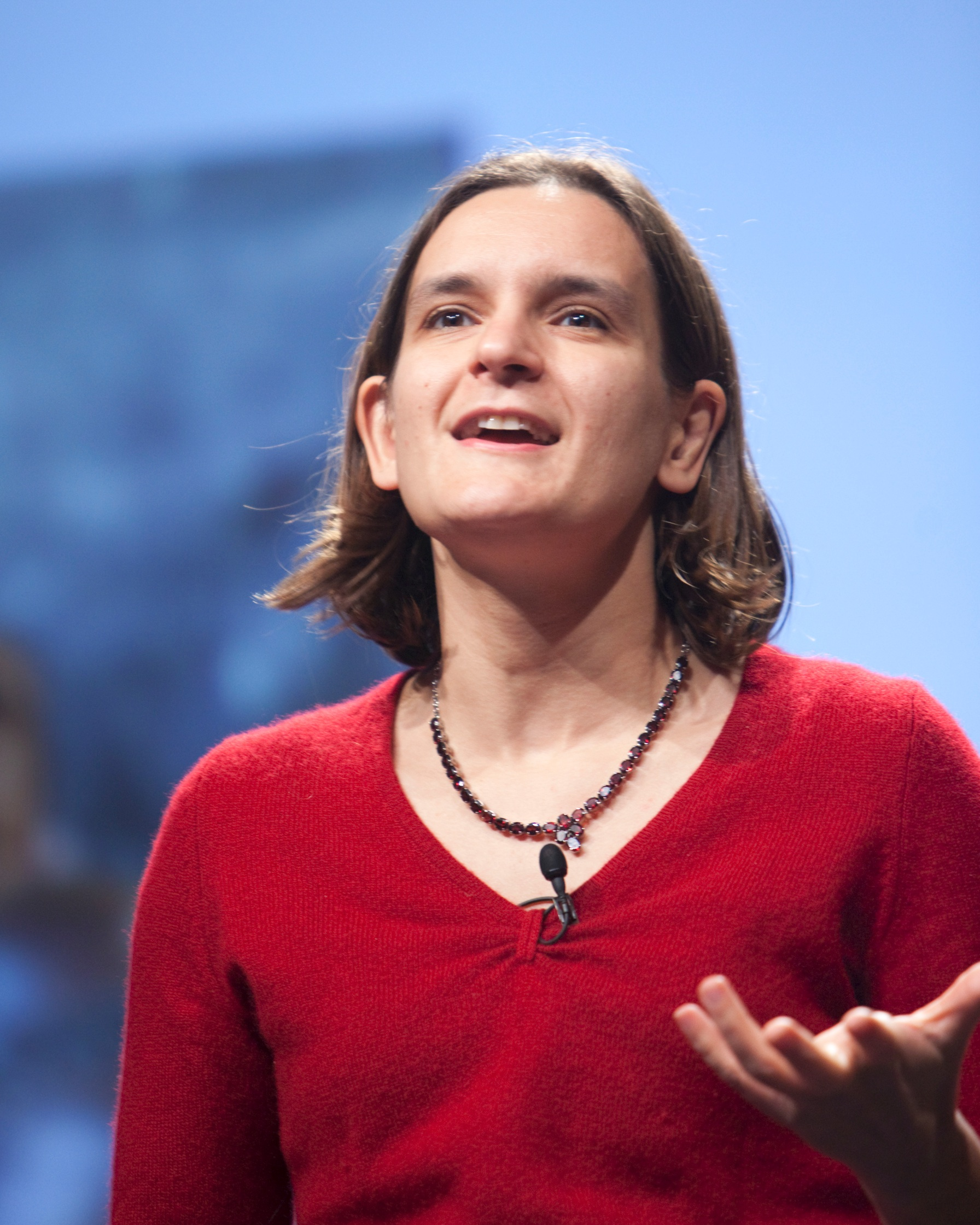
Esther Duflo

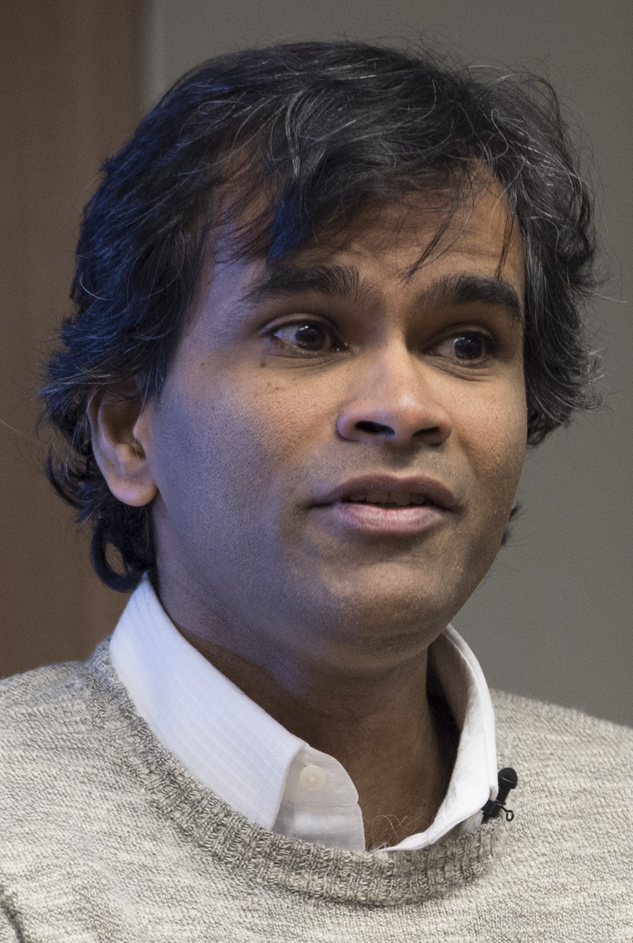
Sendhil Mullainathan
