= Bleakley =

Bleakley is a surname. Notable people with the surname include:

- Christine Lampard, née Bleakley (born 1979), Northern Irish television presenter
- David Bleakley (1925–2017), Northern Irish politician
- Hoyt Bleakley, American economist
- John William Bleakley (1879–1957), Chief Protector of Aboriginals in Queensland, Australia, author of the Bleakley Report in 1929
- Josiah Bleakley (c. 1754–1822), Canadian fur trader
- Orrin Dubbs Bleakley (1854–1927), American politician
- William F. Bleakley (1883–1969), American attorney, New York Supreme Court justice and politician
- William Ward Bleakley (1983–2009), American victim of boat capsizing
