= Westwood High School (Austin, Texas) =

Location
- 12400 Mellow Meadow Drive; Austin, Texas 78750; United States; 30°27′20″N 97°47′51″W

Information
- Type: High School
- Established: 1981
- School district: Round Rock Independent School District
- Principal: Erin Campbell
- Teaching staff: 164.47 FTE)
- Grades: 9 - 12
- Enrollment: 2,856 (2025–2026)
- Student to teacher ratio: 16.98
- Colors: Burnt orange & White
- Athletics conference: UIL Class 6A
- Mascot: Warriors
- Website: westwood.roundrockisd.org

Westwood High School (abbreviated WHS or WWHS) is a public, four-year secondary school in the Anderson Mill neighborhood, Austin, Texas, United States, and is part of the Round Rock Independent School District.

Westwood offers honors and Advanced Placement courses to all students and further houses a district level International Baccalaureate magnet program. As of the 2023–2024 school year, the school had an enrollment of 2,792 students and 164 classroom teachers (on an FTE basis), for a student-teacher ratio of 17.

== Demographics ==
During the 2023–24 school year, of the 2,792 students enrolled, 58.8% were Asian, 33.9% were White, 18.9% were Hispanic, 5.3% were multiracial, 2.7% were Black, 0.4% were Native Americans and 0.1% were Pacific Islanders.

Additionally, 11% of the students were eligible for free or reduced-price lunches.

== Academics ==
As of the 2025-2026 school year, Westwood offers 31 AP classes and 36 IB courses. In 2020, Westwood announced 78 National Merit Semifinalists; in 2021, 44 Semifinalists; in 2022, 68 Semifinalists; in 2023, 45 Semifinalists; in 2024, 52 Semifinalists; and in 2025, 63 Semifinalists.

== Clubs and organizations ==
=== Chess Club ===
In 2009 Westwood traveled to the National Scholastic K-12 Championship, where the 10th grade team won first and the 12th grade team tied for first; the 9th and 11th grade teams placed third and fourth in their sections respectively.

=== Westwood High School Robotics Club ===
The Westwood High School Robotics Club hosts the annual GEMS League for the FIRST Tech Challenge (FTC), welcoming an average of 24 teams from across the region.

Westwood Robotics competes in the FIRST Robotics Competition (FRC) as team number 2583. The FRC team qualified for the Texas State Championship in 2025 and was crowned NTX/STEM Gals Off-Season Champion earlier in the school year in partnership with McNeil High School's FRC team. The FRC team also qualified for the FIRST FRC Championship in 2026, competing in the Archimedes division.

Westwood former FTC Team Tomahawk qualified for the World Championship in 2024, going on to win their division and place among the top 12 teams in the world, and later requalified for the World Championship in 2025, and FTC Team Slingshot advanced to the World Championship in 2026 and advanced to the UIL State Championship, finishing as a Second Place Alliance in the final round.

The club hosts an annual Summer RoboCamp for elementary and middle school students from across Central Texas to encourage STEM education.

== Feeder Patterns ==
Two middle schools feed into this school:

- Canyon Vista
- Grisham

Six elementary schools feed into this school:

- Kathy Caraway
- Laurel Mountain
- Spicewood
- Anderson Mill
- Canyon Creek
- Purple Sage

== Notable alumni ==
- Glen Powell (born 1988), actor
- Brent Clevlen (born 1983), baseball player
- Kelly Johnson (born 1982), baseball player
- Savan Kotecha, Grammy-nominated songwriter and record producer
- Eric Cervini (born 1992), author, historian, activist
- Camilla Luddington (born 1983), actress
- Brian Vera (born 1981), American boxer
- Matt Mackowiak, Austin political consultant and GOP operative
- Manasi Deshpande, American labor economist, associate professor at the University of Chicago
- Rick Trevino (born 1971), country music singer
