= Costly state verification =

Theory of contract design

Costly state verification (CSV) is a framework in contract theory that studies how to design financial contracts when verifying the performance of a borrower is expensive. In this setting, a lender or investor must incur a cost to monitor or audit the actual outcome of a project undertaken by a borrower or entrepreneur. The key challenge is to design a contract that provides the right incentives while minimizing these verification costs.

A central result of the CSV approach, introduced by Robert M. Townsend (1979), is that under certain assumptions, the optimal contract is a standard debt contract. In this contract, there is no disclosure of the entrepreneur's performance as long as debt payments are made. However, if the borrower defaults, the lender pays to verify the actual outcome. This leads to a state-contingent disclosure rule, where verification occurs only in the event of default. Viewed from this perspective, the main role of bankruptcy institutions is to enforce these contracts by verifying and disclosing the assets and liabilities of the firm and establishing its net value during default.

== Description ==
The standard CSV model involves two risk neutral agents: a wealth-constrained entrepreneur with an investment opportunity and a wealthy investor who provides capital. The project yields a random cash flow in the future, with outcomes drawn from a known probability distribution. Only the entrepreneur observes the realized cash flow, but it can be credibly disclosed through costly verification, such as an audit.

Without the possibility of verification, no investment would occur, since the investor would expect the entrepreneur to misreport outcomes in order to avoid repayment. However, regular or mandatory verification is also inefficient, as it would incur unnecessary costs. Instead, the CSV model shows that it is optimal to limit disclosure to situations where the entrepreneur fails to meet repayment obligations.

In the optimal contract, if default occurs, the lender gains the right to the project’s assets, but must pay a fixed bankruptcy cost to recover value. However, this result—that a standard debt contract is optimal—does not generally hold if there are multiple investors or if the entrepreneur undertakes multiple risky projects simultaneously.

== See also ==
- Complete contract
- Contract theory (Economics)
- Agency cost
