= Benjamin Olken =

American economist

- Born: 1975 (age 50–51)
- Spouse: Amy Finkelstein

Academic background
- Education: Yale University (BA); Harvard University (PhD)

Academic work
- Discipline: development economics political economy
- Institutions: Massachusetts Institute of Technology; Abdul Latif Jameel Poverty Action Lab
- Website: Information at IDEAS / RePEc

Benjamin A. Olken (born April 1975) is an American economist and professor at the Massachusetts Institute of Technology (MIT). Olken is one of the directors of the Abdul Latif Jameel Poverty Action Lab (J-PAL), a research centre specializing on the use of randomized evaluations for the purpose of studying poverty alleviation. His research focuses on the political economy of developing countries, especially regarding the role of corruption and the impact of interventions addressing corruption.

== Biography ==
In 1997, Benjamin Olken earned a B.A., summa cum laude, in mathematics, ethics, politics, and economics from Yale University, followed by a Ph.D. in economics from Harvard University in 2004. During his studies, Olken worked as a business analyst for McKinsey & Company in New York City as well as in the World Bank's Jakarta office. After completing his Ph.D., Olken joined the Harvard Society of Fellows as a Junior Fellow in 2005, while also maintaining an affiliation with J-PAL and MIT as a visiting scholar. In 2008, this affiliation translated into an associate professorship with tenure at MIT, which was upgraded to a full professorship in 2012. Besides teaching at MIT, Olken has also held positions as visiting (associate) professor at Harvard University and the Booth School of Business of the University of Chicago.

After working from 2005 to 2010 as an affiliate at J-PAL, Olken became J-PAL's co-chair of the Political Economy and Governance section as well as a Member of J-PAL's board of directors. Since 2012, he has been serving as one of J-PAL's Directors and, in particular, as Co-scientific Director of J-PAL Southeast Asia. In addition to his involvement in J-PAL, Olken is affiliated with several other economic institutions, including the Bureau for Research and Economic Analysis of Development (BREAD), the International Growth Centre, the Centre for Economic Policy Research (CEPR), and the National Bureau of Economic Research (NBER). Finally, Olken also contributes as associate or co-editor to the Review of Economics and Statistics, Journal of Development Economics, and the American Economic Journal: Applied Economics.

== Research ==
Olken's research interests focus on development economics in general and the political economies of developing countries (e.g. corruption) in particular. Geographically, a large part of his research is concentrated on Southeast Asia, especially Indonesia. With regard to research output, Olken belongs to the top 3% highest-ranked economists according to the bibliographic database IDEAS/RePEc.

In his research on corruption, Olken finds that traditional top-down monitoring can substantially reduce corruption even in highly corrupt environments based on the impact evaluation of a randomized field experiment involving government audits of village road projects in Indonesia; an announced increase in the share of monitored projects from 4% to 100% decreases missing expenditures by 8%, making the audits cost-effective. In another Indonesian field experiment, Olken and Patrick Barron document the influence of market structure on bribe payments, i.e. whether the drivers of overweight trucks have affordable alternatives to driving on roads with frequent checkpoints, and the use of sophisticated pricing schemes by corrupt officials (e.g. two-part tariffs). Olken's research on corruption also touches about the differences between (often used) corruption perceptions and the actual extent of corruption; contrasting the perceptions of Indonesian villagers of corruption with more objective measures, Olken finds that villagers do perceive corruption and are able to distinguish between project-specific corruption and general corruption but that they also typically misestimate the true extent of corruption and are subject to systematic biases. These results suggest substantial limits to the reliability of subjective corruption perceptions in research.

Another strand of Olken's research deals with the relationship between temperature and economic development (and the direction of the relationship's causality). In his research on the relationship between temperature and economic growth, together with Melissa Dell and Benjamin F. Jones, Olken finds that higher temperatures (i) substantially decrease economic growth in developing countries, (ii) reduce both growth rates and output levels, and (iii) depress agricultural and industrial output as well as political stability, thus overall suggesting the potential of large negative impacts of higher temperatures on developing countries. These conclusions have been challenged as relying on "an untenable method of classifying countries by income." Furthermore, in prior work, Dell, Jones and Olken also found that a large part of the strongly negative impact of high temperatures on income may be offset by adaptation in the long run. These and other results are summarized and discussed in these authors' highly cited review of the economics of climate change, What Do We Learn from the Weather?.

== Personal life ==
Olken is married to MIT economist Amy Finkelstein.
