= Timothy G. Conley =

Professor of economics at the University of Western Ontario

Timothy G. Conley is a professor of economics at University of Western Ontario. His research interests include development economics, applied and theoretical econometrics and empirical industrial organization.

== Works ==
His most cited works are:

- "GMM estimation with cross sectional dependence in Journal of Econometrics 92 (1), 1-45 3474 1999
- "Learning about a new technology: Pineapple in Ghana written with Christopher Udry in the American Economic Review 100 (1), 35-69 3236 2010
- "Plausibly exogenous" written with Christian B Hansen, Peter E Rossi in the Review of Economics and Statistics 94 (1), 260-272
