= Tavneet Suri =

Kenyan development economist

- Citizenship: Kenya
- Education: Trinity College, Cambridge (BA) Yale University (MA, MA, MPhil, PhD)
- Scientific career
- Fields: Development Economics
- Workplaces: MIT Sloan School of Management
- Thesis: Empirical Essays in the Microeconomics of Development in Sub-Saharan Africa (2006)
- Doctoral advisor: Michael Boozer, Gustav Ranis, Paul Schultz, Christopher Udry

Tavneet Suri is a Kenyan development economist currently serving as the Louis E. Seley Professor of Applied Economics at the MIT Sloan School of Management. She is a member of the executive committee of the Abdul Latif Jameel Poverty Action Lab, and a faculty research associate at the National Bureau of Economic Research. Her research focuses on technology adoption and usage in Sub-Saharan Africa.

== Biography ==
After growing up in Kenya, Suri received her BA in economics from Trinity College, Cambridge, and her MA and PhD from Yale University. At Yale, she was a student of Michael Boozer and Christopher Udry, and won the George Trimis Prize for Distinction in Dissertation.

In 2006, Suri joined the faculty of the MIT Sloan School of Management as an assistant professor. She became involved in J-PAL through work with Rachel Glennerster in Sierra Leone, eventually rising to become the organization's scientific director for Africa.

In line with her research, Suri is co-editor of The Review of Economics and Statistics and co-chair of the J-PAL Digital Agricultural Innovations and Services Initiative. She is affiliated with the National Bureau of Economic Research and Bureau for Research and Economic Analysis of Development.

== Research ==
Suri's research primarily focuses on the uptake and diffusion of new technologies in the developing world. She has devoted particular attention to the take-up of innovations in agriculture and mobile payments.

=== Mobile Money ===
Suri has also directed her attention towards mobile money, studying disparities in Kenyan households' access to M-Pesa agents to study the impact of the scheme on risk management, poverty, and consumption. They find that mobile money facilitates risk sharing, with remittances more easily transferred between household members. In total, they estimate that the rollout of the scheme lifted 194,000 Kenyan households out of poverty, a 2% reduction.
