= Karthik Muralidharan =

Indian economist (born 1975)

Prof. Karthik Muralidharan
- Karthik Muralidharan
- Born: 1975 (age 50–51)
- Education: Harvard University (BA) (PhD); University of Cambridge (MPhil)
- Occupations: Economist, Academic, Author
- Writing career
- Subjects: Development Economics, Public Finance, Education, Health
- Notable work: Accelerating India's Development
- Notable awards: Crossword Book Award (2024); Gaja Capital Business Book Prize (2025)

Karthik Muralidharan is an Indian economist, academic and author. He currently serves as the Chief Economist and Director General of the Economic Research and Development Impact Department at the Asian Development Bank. He is also the Tata Chancellor's Professor of Economics at the University of California, San Diego, a Research Associate of the NBER, and former global education sector co-chair at J-PAL. His primary research interests include development economics, public economics, and labour economics. He is the author of Accelerating India's Development: A State-Led Roadmap for Effective Governance (2024), which won the Jury Award in the Business & Management category at the 2024 Crossword Book Awards and the 2025 Gaja Capital Business Book Prize. He is the co-founder and scientific director of the Centre For Effective Governance of Indian States (CEGIS), an organisation aimed to improve state governments deliver better development outcomes.

== Education and career ==
After growing up in India, Karthik Muralidharan earned an A.B. in economics (summa cum laude) from Harvard University in 1998, followed by an M.Phil. in economics from Cambridge University in 1999, and a Ph.D. in economics again from Harvard University in 2007.

Muralidharan was a postdoctoral fellow at the Harvard Graduate School of Education from 2007 to 2008 before joining the University of California, San Diego as an assistant professor in 2008. He became an associate professor in 2014, Tata Chancellor's Associate Professor in 2017, and Tata Chancellor's Professor of Economics in 2018.

In terms of professional service, he holds editorships with the Journal of Development Economics, the American Economic Journal: Applied Economics, and India Policy Forum, in addition to refereeing for various academic journals in economics.

In November 2026, Muralidharan was announced as the Asian Development Bank's next Chief Economist. He will take up his position in July 2027.

== Research ==
Muralidharan's research focuses on education, health and social protection, the measurement of the quality of public service delivery, programme evaluation, and improvements to the effectiveness of public spending (especially in developing countries). In particular, Muralidharan has contributed to the research of public servant absenteeism in developing countries, with a focus on teachers and health workers, e.g. finding that on average ca. 19% of teachers and 35% of health workers were absent on a given work day in a sample of developing countries (Bangladesh, Ecuador, India, Indonesia, Peru and Uganda), and that among those present many weren't working. Focusing on teacher absenteeism in India, further findings include that higher pay isn't generally correlated with higher presence, presence decreases in age and rank, and that absenteeism cannot be explained by teachers being outsiders to the communities in which they are teaching (as comparable local teachers have similar absence rates); moreover, private school teachers are only slightly less likely to be absent than public school teachers unless there is local competition between private and public schools. In another study on education, Muralidharan (together with Venkatesh Sundararaman) found that conditioning teacher pay on their performance for two years was effective in increasing students' performance in math and language tests by 0.27 and 0.17 standard deviations, respectively, in schools in Andhra Pradesh.

In 2018, he was ranked among the top 5% of economists on IDEAS/RePEc.
