= Manasi Deshpande =

Labor and public economist

- Education: University of Texas, Austin (BA); Massachusetts Institute of Technology (MA, PhD)
- Awards: National Science Foundation CAREER Award; Sloan Research Fellowship; Harry S. Truman Scholarship
- Scientific career
- Fields: Public Economics; Labor Economics
- Institutions: University of Chicago
- Thesis: Essays on the effects of disability insurance (2015)
- Doctoral advisor: Amy Finkelstein; David Autor; Michael Greenstone
- Website: https://sites.google.com/view/mdeshpande

Manasi Deshpande is an American labor economist currently serving as associate professor of economics at the University of Chicago. Her research focuses on empirical public finance, in particular on the interplay between welfare programs and labor markets. Deshpande is the recipient of a Sloan Research Fellowship, awarded by the Alfred P. Sloan Foundation annually to early-career scientists "who have the potential to revolutionize their fields of study." She is also the recipient of a National Science Foundation CAREER Award.

== Biography ==
Deshpande received her BA in Economics and Mathematics from the University of Texas at Austin in 2007, and her PhD in economics from the Massachusetts Institute of Technology, where she was supported by a Harry S. Truman Scholarship and a National Science Foundation Graduate Research Fellowship. Prior to joining MIT, she worked as a Research Assistant at the Hamilton Project of the Brookings Institution and a Policy Adviser at the National Economic Council. Her dissertation research examined the effects of disability insurance, and was supervised by David Autor, Amy Finkelstein, and Michael Greenstone.

After completing her PhD, Deshpande joined the National Bureau of Economic Research as a Post-Doctoral Fellow, followed by the University of Chicago as an assistant professor of economics. In 2020, she received a National Science Foundation CAREER Award, and in 2023, she was the recipient of a Sloan Research Fellowship. In 2023, she received tenure at the University of Chicago, gaining promotion to associate professor.

== Research ==
Deshpande's research focuses on the effects of social assistance schemes on labor markets. She has pursued research on disability insurance, Supplemental Security Income, and Social Security in the United States.

=== Disability insurance ===
Deshpande's dissertation research focused on the effects of disability insurance on labor markets. In a paper in the American Economic Review, she shows that children removed from Supplemental Security Income have low incomes and little earnings growth into adulthood, suggesting that disability insurance has minimal effect on work incentives. For her work, she received the PhD Dissertation Award from the Association for Public Policy Analysis and Management.

Deshpande has also pursued research on the effects of application costs on the take-up of welfare benefits. In work with Yue Li in the American Economic Journal Economic Policy, Deshpande shows that closings of field offices by the Social Security Administration decreased the number of disability insurance beneficiaries in nearby areas, with effects especially strong for those with low education and earnings. For their work, Deshpande and Li were awarded the prize for best paper published in the American Economic Journal Economic Policy by the American Economic Association.

=== Welfare and crime ===
In work with Michael Mueller-Smith in the Quarterly Journal of Economics, Deshpande leverages an age cutoff in review requirements for Supplemental Security Income benefits to show that removal from the program leads to a 20% increase in crime over twenty years, with effects driven by income-generating offenses such as theft, prostitution, and fraud.
