= Robert M. Townsend =

American economist

- Born: Robert Morris Townsend; April 23, 1948 (age 78); Cambridge, Massachusetts, U.S.
- Education: Duke University (BA); University of Minnesota (PhD)
- Known for: costly state verification revelation principle turnpike model of money
- Awards: Frisch Medal
- Scientific career
- Fields: Economics
- Workplaces: Carnegie Mellon University; University of Chicago; Massachusetts Institute of Technology
- Doctoral advisor: Neil Wallace

Robert Morris Townsend (born April 23, 1948) is an American economist and professor; he is the Elizabeth & James Killian Professor of Economics at Massachusetts Institute of Technology. Prior to joining MIT, he was the Charles E. Merriam Distinguished Service Professor in the Department of Economics at the University of Chicago where he remained a research associate (professor) until 2018.

== Biography ==
Robert Townsend was born in Cambridge, Massachusetts, in 1948. He is the brother of John S. Townsend, a professor of physics at Harvey Mudd College.

Townsend received his B.A. from Duke University in 1970 and Ph.D. from the University of Minnesota in 1975. He began teaching at Carnegie Mellon University in 1975, and became a professor at the University of Chicago in 1985 where he stayed full-time until moving to MIT in 2008. From 1987 to 1989 Townsend was also editor of the Journal of Political Economy.

In addition to his professorships, Townsend is the Principal Investigator and Project Director of the Enterprise Initiative, funded by the John Templeton Foundation, and the Principal Investigator of the Consortium on Financial Systems and Poverty, funded by the Bill and Melinda Gates Foundation. Additionally, he is a consultant for numerous institutions, including the Federal Reserve Bank of Chicago, the World Bank, and Banco de España.

Townsend is a fellow of the American Academy of Arts and Sciences and of The Econometric Society, as well as an Elected Member of the National Academy of Sciences. He was the recipient of the Jean-Jacques Laffont Prize in 2011, and a Frisch Medal in 1998 for his work on village India and in 2012 for the structural evaluation of a large-scale microfinance program in Thailand; Townsend is the award's only two-time winner.

== Research ==
Townsend began his work as a theorist in general equilibrium models and contract theory/mechanism design, but is known primarily for his work on revelation principle, costly state verification, optimal multi-period contracts, decentralization of economies with private information, models of money with spatially separated agents, and forecasting the forecasts of others. His contributions in econometrics include the study of risk and insurance in developing countries.

Since 1997, Townsend's Thai Project has undertaken large scale village surveys in Thailand to analyze the interaction between household decisions and community behavior at the level of families, villages, regions, and the nation. The Townsend Thai study was the first of its kind and has been the stepping stone for many other applied and theoretical projects in economic development and contract theory. Townsend's work has demonstrated innovation in the combination of theory and data, as well as the ability to work across various sub-fields. A documentary film about his research and field work in Thailand, titled Emerging Thailand: The Spirit of Small Enterprise, was created in 2012.

== Films ==
In 2012, a series of documentary films was created about the people and research behind the Townsend Thai Project. The series consists of one main film and a set of smaller, shorter films that highlight the work of entrepreneurs in rural Thailand.

- Emerging Thailand: The Spirit of Small Enterprise (34:15)
- Portraits of Thailand: Silkworm Farmer (2:37)
- Portraits of Thailand: Rubber Farmer (3:05)
- Portraits of Thailand: Food Cart Owner (1:51)
- Portraits of Thailand: Dairy Farmer (2:21)

== Books ==
- (with Sombat Sakunthasathien and Rob Jordan) "Chronicles from the Field: The Townsend Thai Project" (MIT Press, 2013). ISBN 9780262019071 (hard cover) ISBN 9780262314145 (Ebook)
- (with Krislert Samphantharak) Households as Corporate Firms: An Analysis of Household Finance Using Integrated Household Surveys and Corporate Financial Accounting (Cambridge University Press, 2010). ISBN 0-521-19582-9.
- Financial Systems in Developing Economies: Growth, Inequality, Poverty and Policy Evaluation in Thailand (Oxford University Press, 2008). ISBN 0-19-953323-7.
- The Medieval Village Economy: A Study of the Pareto Mapping in General Equilibrium Models (Princeton University Press, 1993). ISBN 0-691-04270-5.
- Financial Structure and Economic Organization: Key Elements and Patterns in Theory and History (Basil Blackwell, 1990). ISBN 1-55786-039-4.
