= Elisabeth Sadoulet =

Economist

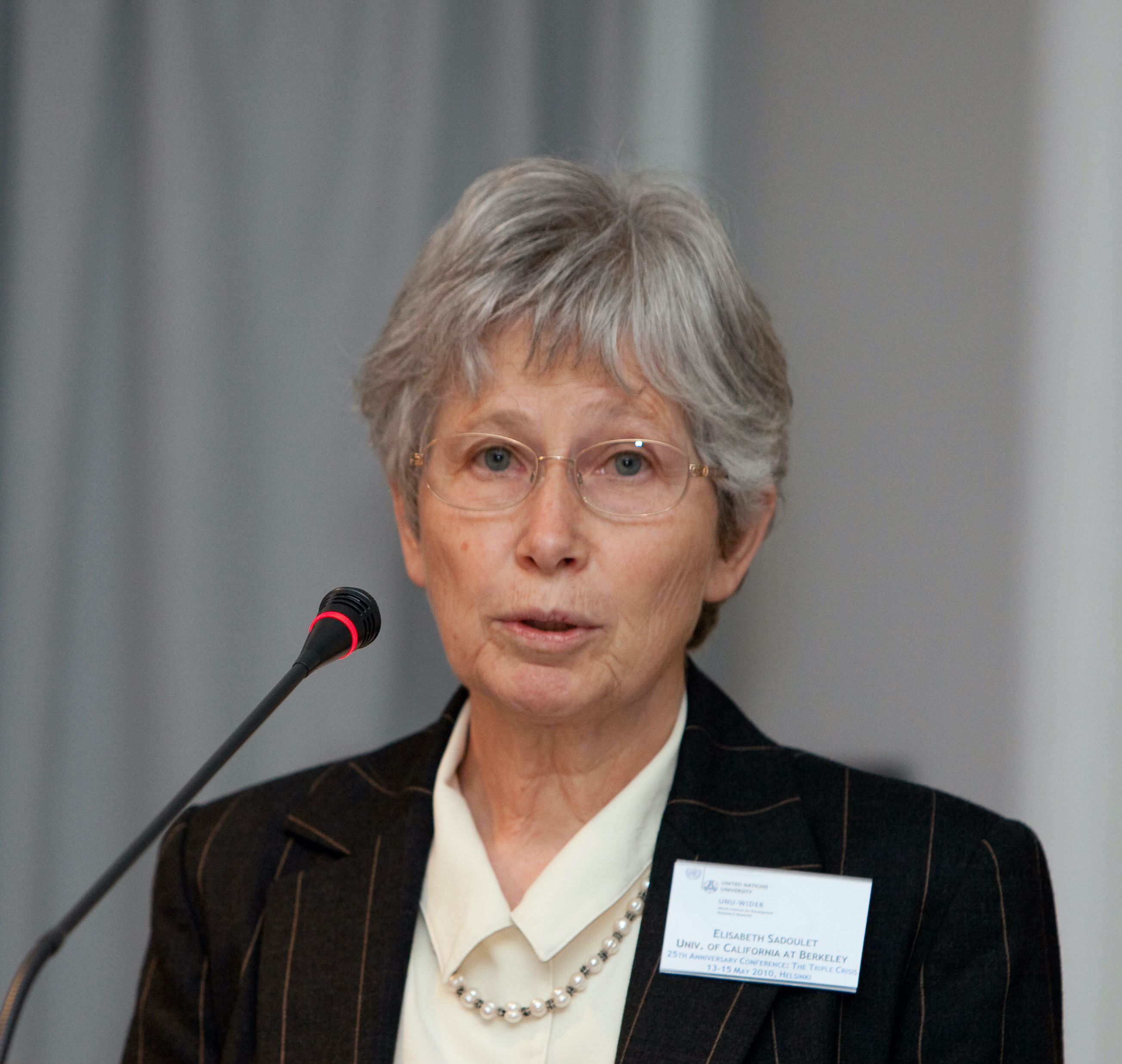
- Born: October 4, 1945; Lyon, France
- Died: October 17, 2025; Lyon, France
- Occupations: Economist and professor
- Spouse: Alain de Janvry

Academic background
- Education: University of Geneva

Elisabeth Sadoulet (October 4, 1945 – October 17, 2025) was an economist and Professor of Agricultural and Resource Economics at the University of California, Berkeley. She carried out field research in China, India, Latin America, and sub-Saharan Africa. Sadoulet was the editor of the World Bank Economic Review from 2010 to 2013, and was a fellow of several scholarly associations in the fields of agriculture and economics.

Sadoulet has worked in an advisory capacity with organizations including the Government of Mexico, the Food and Agriculture Organization of the United Nations (FAO), and the World Bank. She is a senior fellow at the Fondation pour les études et recherches sur le développement international (FERDI).

== Career ==
Sadoulet obtained her PhD from the University of Geneva in 1982, after studying mathematics and econometrics. In 1985, she joined the University of California, Berkeley as a Lecturer where she has remained. Along with agronomist and economist Alain de Janvry, whom she met at UC Berkeley, Sadoulet is one of a small number of French economists working in the United States.

Sadoulet was the editor of the World Bank Economic Review from 2010 to 2013, and on the editorial board of the Review of Agricultural and Environmental Studies from 2008 to 2010.

== Research ==
Sadoulet's research mainly focused on agricultural economics. She named Angus Deaton, Irma Adelman, Abhijit Banerjee and Esther Duflo as having influenced her approach to economics as both a quantitative and experimental discipline, in which rigorous analysis became the basis for policy recommendations in normative work with governments, organizations, NGOs, and the private sector.

Throughout her career, she focused on "how to make agriculture into an effective instrument for development", believing that it is underused and misused, but still presents unique opportunities. Beginning with a focus on growth and poverty, her work includes vulnerability to poverty and risk, inequality and inequity, basic needs in health and education, access to assets, microfinancing, land rental contracts, technology innovation, social programs, community-driven development, adaptation to climate change, resource scarcity, cooperative management of common property resources, and governance.

Sadoulet published the textbooks Quantitative development policy analysis (1995, 2003) and Development Economics: Theory and practice (2016, 2021) with Alain De Janvry.

Sadoulet published in The American Economic Review (AER), The Economic Journal (EJ), the Journal of Development Economics (JDE), World Development (WD), and the Annual Review of Resource Economics. As of 2022 Sadoulet is ranked #472 in the top 5% of the most prolific economists in the world, with 288 publications listed on IDEAS. Her works have been cited over 28,492 times on Google Scholar.

== Awards ==
Sadoulet became an honorary life member of the International Association of Agricultural Economists in 2018. She became a fellow of the American Association of Agricultural Economics in 2011. She is also a fellow of the Agricultural & Applied Economics Association (AAEA).

Sadoulet was recognized by the AAEA for her research, her teaching and her advisory work in the area of international economic development. Sadoulet received the College of Natural Resources (CNR) Distinguished Teaching Award in 2016. She was a recipient of the Publication of Enduring Quality Award at the AAEA & WAEA Joint Annual Meeting in 2021.

== Selected publications ==
- de Janvry, Alain; Sadoulet, Elisabeth (5 October 2022). "Agriculture for Development: Analytics and Action". Annual Review of Resource Economics. 14 (1): 1–16. doi:10.1146/annurev-resource-090921-045011. ISSN 1941-1340. S2CID 249558742.
- de Janvry, Alain; Sadoulet, Elisabeth (1 March 2020). "How experimental research in agriculture has gone from lab to field". World Development. 127 104782. doi:10.1016/j.worlddev.2019.104782. ISSN 0305-750X. S2CID 213085291.
- Carter, Michael; de Janvry, Alain; Sadoulet, Elisabeth; Sarris, Alexandros (5 October 2017). "Index Insurance for Developing Country Agriculture: A Reassessment". Annual Review of Resource Economics. 9 (1): 421–438. doi:10.1146/annurev-resource-100516-053352. ISSN 1941-1340.
- Emerick, Kyle; de Janvry, Alain; Sadoulet, Elisabeth; Dar, Manzoor H. (1 June 2016). "Technological Innovations, Downside Risk, and the Modernization of Agriculture" (PDF). American Economic Review. 106 (6): 1537–1561. doi:10.1257/aer.20150474.
- Byerlee, Derek; de Janvry, Alain; Sadoulet, Elisabeth (October 2009). "Agriculture for Development: Toward a New Paradigm". Annual Review of Resource Economics. 1 (1): 15–31. doi:10.1146/annurev.resource.050708.144239. hdl:10986/5480. ISSN 1941-1340.
- de Janvry, Alain; Finan, Frederico; Sadoulet, Elisabeth; Vakis, Renos (1 April 2006). "Can conditional cash transfer programs serve as safety nets in keeping children at school and from working when exposed to shocks?". Journal of Development Economics. 79 (2): 349–373. doi:10.1016/j.jdeveco.2006.01.013. ISSN 0304-3878.
- de la Brière, Bénédicte; Sadoulet, Elisabeth; de Janvry, Alain; Lambert, Sylvie (1 August 2002). "The roles of destination, gender, and household composition in explaining remittances: an analysis for the Dominican Sierra". Journal of Development Economics. 68 (2): 309–328. doi:10.1016/S0304-3878(02)00015-9. ISSN 0304-3878.
- de Janvry, Alain; Sadoulet, Elisabeth (1 March 2001). "Income Strategies Among Rural Households in Mexico: The Role of Off-farm Activities". World Development. 29 (3): 467–480. doi:10.1016/S0305-750X(00)00113-3. ISSN 0305-750X.
- De Janvry, Alain; Gordillo, Gustavo; Sadoulet, Elisabeth (1997). Mexico's second agrarian reform : household and community responses, 1990-1994. La Jolla, Calif.: Center for U.S.-Mexican Studies, University of California, San Diego. ISBN 978-1878367303.
- Sadoulet, Elisabeth; Janvry, Alain (May 1992). "Agricultural Trade Liberalization and Low Income Countries: A General Equilibrium-Multimarket Approach". American Journal of Agricultural Economics. 74 (2): 268–280. doi:10.2307/1242481. ISSN 0002-9092. JSTOR 1242481.
- de Janvry, Alain; Fafchamps, Marcel; Sadoulet, Elisabeth (1991). "Peasant Household Behaviour with Missing Markets: Some Paradoxes Explained". The Economic Journal. 101 (409): 1400–1417. doi:10.2307/2234892. ISSN 0013-0133. JSTOR 2234892.
- Janvry, Alain; Sadoulet, Elisabeth (May 1987). "Agricultural Price Policy in General Equilibrium Models: Results and Comparisons". American Journal of Agricultural Economics. 69 (2): 230–246. doi:10.2307/1242273. ISSN 0002-9092. JSTOR 1242273.
