= Amy Finkelstein =

American economist

- Born: November 2, 1973 (age 52); New York City, U.S.
- Spouse: Benjamin Olken

Academic background
- Education: Harvard University (BA); University of Oxford (MPhil); Massachusetts Institute of Technology (PhD)
- Doctoral advisor: James M. Poterba; Jonathan Gruber

Academic work
- Discipline: Public finance, health economics
- Institutions: Massachusetts Institute of Technology
- Doctoral students: Heidi Williams; Manasi Deshpande
- Awards: John Bates Clark Medal, 2012; Elaine Bennett Research Prize, 2008
- Website: Information at IDEAS / RePEc

Amy Nadya Finkelstein (born November 2, 1973) is an American economist who is a professor of economics at the Massachusetts Institute of Technology (MIT), the co-director and research associate of the Public Economics Program at the National Bureau of Economic Research, and the co-Scientific Director of J-PAL North America.

She was awarded the 2012 John Bates Clark Medal for her contributions to economics. She was elected to the National Academy of Sciences and won a MacArthur "Genius" fellowship in 2018.

== Education ==
Finkelstein studied government at Harvard University, where she was a Truman Scholar and received a BA, summa cum laude, in 1995. At Harvard, her interest in economics was inspired in part by taking economist Lawrence Katz's course "Social Problems in the American Economy". She was a Marshall Scholar at Oxford University, where she received an M.Phil. in economics in 1997. She received her PhD in economics from MIT in 2001 under supervision of James M. Poterba and Jonathan Gruber.

== Career ==
Finkelstein was a Junior Fellow at the Harvard Society of Fellows for three years, after which she joined the MIT faculty in 2005 and received tenure within three years.

In 2016, MIT's School of Humanities, Arts, and Social Sciences named Finkelstein the John and Jennie S. MacDonald Professor for a five-year term. The professorship was established with a gift by Edmund MacDonald, and recognizes Finkelstein's outstanding achievements in the field of economics.

In 2020, Finklestein was named a codirectors of the NBER Health Care Program. The program was launched in 2000 under the leadership of Alan Garber, who is currently provost of Harvard University, to study the markets for health care services, health insurance, and the provision of medical care.

Finkelstein was elected a vice-president of the American Economic Association for 2025.

Finkelstein also serves as the co-Scientific Director of J-PAL North America, where she helps guide randomized evaluations of U.S. social policy.

== Contribution to the Oregon Health Insurance Experiment ==
A significant part of the research by Finkelstein has been to examine the Oregon Health Insurance Experiment, the first large-scale, randomized, controlled study of Medicaid in the United States. Since 2008, Oregon has been using a lottery to assign Medicaid slots to uninsured, low-income adults in limited numbers. With the assistance of Katherine Baicker and a larger group of researchers, Finkelstein was able to design and evaluate this as a natural experiment. Their results showed significant increase in health-care access, both outpatient access and ED access, and decreased financial burden owing to catastrophic medical expenditures and medical debts. The study also reported better self-reported health and reduced cases of depression on new Medicaid beneficiaries.

The experiment transformed the empirical methodology of health economics through demonstrating that randomized designs can be applied to the large-scale study of public insurance programs. It also contributed significantly to national debate on Medicaid expansion in the process and after the adoption of the Affordable Care Act. The publications which followed are now amongst the most referred to in contemporary health policy studies and played a major role in making Finkelstein an acknowledged expert in public finance and health economics.

== Research ==
Finkelstein's primary expertise is in public finance and health economics, focusing particularly on health insurance. She conducts research into market failures and government intervention in insurance markets, and the impact of public policy on health care and health insurance. Together with Katherine Baicker, she is one of two principal investigators of the Oregon Health Insurance Experiment, a randomized evaluation of the impact of expanding Medicaid to low-income adults. Her research has shown that newly enrolled Medicaid patients make more trips overall to providers after acquiring insurance, make more visits to emergency rooms, and benefit financially from having insurance, among other findings. Finkelstein said that the body of research, including her work on the effects of the 2008 Medicaid expansion in Oregon, have made her confident that health insurance improves health.

== Awards ==
In 2008, Finkelstein was awarded the Elaine Bennett Research Prize by the Committee on the Status of Women in the Economics Profession (CSWEP), for her contributions to the economics profession. In 2012, she was awarded the John Bates Clark Medal from the American Economic Association. The award cited her research as "a model of how theory and empirics can be combined in creative ways". In 2018, Finkelstein received a MacArthur "Genius" Grant.

== Personal life ==
Finkelstein is Jewish. She was born in New York City in 1973 to biologist parents, who both earned doctorates at The Rockefeller University. Her mother immigrated to the United States from Poland in 1940, where her maternal grandmother had earlier earned a doctorate in comparative literature at the University of Warsaw.

Finkelstein is married to MIT economist Benjamin Olken.

== Select publications ==
- Baicker, Katherine; Finkelstein, Amy (2011). "The Effects of Medicaid Coverage — Learning from the Oregon Experiment". New England Journal of Medicine. 365 (8): 683–685. doi:10.1056/nejmp1108222. ISSN 0028-4793. PMC 3321578. PMID 21774703.
- Finkelstein, Amy N.; Taubman, Sarah L.; Allen, Heidi L.; Wright, Bill J.; Baicker, Katherine (2016). "Effect of Medicaid Coverage on ED Use — Further Evidence from Oregon's Experiment". New England Journal of Medicine. 375 (16): 1505–1507. doi:10.1056/nejmp1609533. hdl:1721.1/114043. PMID 27797307. S2CID 30226905.
- Finkelstein, Amy; Gentzkow, Matthew; Hull, Peter; Williams, Heidi (2017). "Adjusting Risk Adjustment — Accounting for Variation in Diagnostic Intensity". New England Journal of Medicine. 376 (7): 608–610. doi:10.1056/nejmp1613238. PMC 5380362. PMID 28199802.
- Dobkin, Carlos; Finkelstein, Amy; Kluender, Raymond; Notowidigdo, Matthew J. (March 2018). "Myth and Measurement — The Case of Medical Bankruptcies". New England Journal of Medicine. 378 (12): 1076–1078. doi:10.1056/nejmp1716604. PMC 5865642. PMID 29562153.
