= Hoyt Bleakley =

American economist

Hoyt Bleakley is an economist who currently works as an associate professor at the University of Michigan. His research has focused on economic history, development economics, labour economics, health economics, and international macroeconomics.

== Biography ==
Hoyt Bleakley studied economics at the Massachusetts Institute of Technology (MIT), from where he obtained his Ph.D. in 2002. Thereafter, he worked in 2002-2003 as a postdoctoral fellow at the Population Research Center of the University of Chicago before becoming an assistant professor of economics at the University of California, San Diego in 2003 and moving to the Booth School of Business in 2005. There, he began working at the Center for Population Economics and was promoted to associate professor in 2009. In 2014, Bleakley took over a position as associate professor at the University of Michigan, where he is also affiliated with the Population Studies Center. Moreover, Bleakley has been affiliated with the National Bureau of Economic Research since 2007 and had visiting positions at Princeton University.

In addition to these positions, Hoyt Bleakley has acted as a referee for numerous research journals in the social and health sciences, was a member of the editorial board of the Journal of Economic History from 2013 to 2017, and deputy editor of Demography. In 2010 and 2012, he has received awards for his research using IPUMS data, as well as the 2011 Prize for Best Paper in the American Economic Journal.

== Research ==
Hoyt Bleakley's research has focused on economic history, development economics, labour economics, health, and international macroeconomics. Based on his research, he is currently (January 2018) ranked among the top 3% of economists registered on IDEAS/RePEc. Major findings of his research include:

- that the hookworm eradication campaigns in the American South after 1910 were effective in drastically reducing hookworm infection rates and thereby contributed strongly to the educational and economic development of these areas;
- that malaria eradication campaigns in the United States (ca. 1920) and in Brazil, Colombia and Mexico (ca. 1955) strongly improved labour productivity by reducing childhood exposure to malaria and explain a substantial part of cross-regional differences in income;
- that Latin American firms holding dollar-denominated debt don't invest less than their peso-indebted counterparts following a depreciation against the dollar and adjust the currency denomination of their liabilities to hedge how sensitive their profits become to exchange rate movements;
- that English proficiency significantly increases wages among adults who came to the U.S. as children by affecting their education;
- how the location of certain North American cities at portage sites had a long-term impact on their economic development, even long after portage had become obsolete.
