= The World Economy (journal) =

- Discipline: Economics, international relations
- Language: English
- Edited by: David Greenaway, Chris Milner

Publication details
- History: 1977-present
- Publisher: John Wiley & Sons
- Frequency: Monthly
- Impact factor: 1.450 (2020)

Standard abbreviations
- ISO 4: World Econ.

Indexing
- ISSN: 0378-5920 (print); 1467-9701 (web)
- OCLC no.: 768317814

Links
- Journal homepage; Online access; Online archive

The World Economy is a monthly peer-reviewed academic journal covering economics and international relations, specifically trade policy, open economy issues, and developing economies. The journal is published by John Wiley & Sons and the current editors-in-chief are David Greenaway and Chris Milner both of the University of Nottingham.

Since 2008, with the Nottingham Centre for Research on Globalisation and Economic Policy at the University of Nottingham, the journal has co-hosted the World Economy Asia Lectures, the World Economy Annual Lectures, and the World Economy Annual China Lectures. It publishes an annual special issue on global trade policy, which is subsequently available as a book in the Global Trade Policy series.

== Abstracting and indexing ==
The World Economy is abstracted and indexed in the Social Sciences Citation Index, Scopus, ProQuest, EconLit, the International Bibliography of the Social Sciences, and Research Papers in Economics. According to the Journal Citation Reports, the journal has a 2020 impact factor of 1.450, ranking it 63rd out of 95 journals in the category "International Relations", 83rd out of 110 journals in the category "Business Finance" and 250th out of 378 journals in the category "Economics".

== See also ==
- The Developing Economies (journal)
