= Christopher Udry =

American economist

- Education: Swarthmore College (BA); Yale University (PhD)
- Scientific career
- Fields: Development Economics
- Workplaces: Northwestern University
- Notable students: Tavneet Suri; David McKenzie (economist); Leonard Wantchekon

Christopher R. Udry is an American economist who currently serves as King Professor of Economics at Northwestern University. Udry is the co-founder (with Dean Karlan) and current co-director of the Global Poverty Research Lab at the Kellogg School of Management. Udry's research focuses mostly on development economics, in particular rural development in Sub-Saharan Africa, to which he owes his position as one of the world's most prominent agricultural economists.

== Biography ==
After earning a B.A. in economics from Swarthmore College in 1981, Udry taught for two years as a secondary school teacher in Tamale, Ghana. Thereafter, he went on to earn a Ph.D. from Yale University in 1991, for which he studied rural credit in northern Nigeria, being a visiting research scholar at the Ahmadu Bello University in 1988–89.

Following his graduation, Udry worked first as an assistant professor (1990–96) and then as an associate professor (1996–98) of economics at Northwestern University, and as visiting senior research scholar at the University of Ghana (1996–97), before becoming a professor of economics at Yale University (1998–2004) and being promoted to the position of Henry J. Heinz Professor of Economics (2004–17). In parallel, at Yale, he served as Director of the Economic Growth Center (2000–05), Chair of the Department of Economics (2006–10), and several times as Chair of the Council on African Studies. Finally, Udry returned to Northwestern University in 2017, where has since then been the Robert E. and Emily King Professor of Economics.

Currently, Udry is serving on the boards of the Bureau for Research and Economic Analysis of Development and the Abdul Latif Jameel Poverty Action Lab, and affiliated to the National Bureau of Economic Research as a research associate. In terms of professional service, he sits on the editorial boards of the Journal of Development Economics (since 1995), Econometrica (2001–09), Economic Development and Cultural Change (2004–09), American Economic Review (2005–09), and the Journal of Economic Perspectives (2013–16). Finally, his research contributions have been acknowledged by a fellowship in the Econometric Society in 2005 as well as membership in the American Academy of Arts and Sciences (since 2011). In September 2017, Udry co-founded (with Dean Karlan) the Global Poverty Research Lab, a research center dedicated to the promotion of evidence-based poverty reduction, which he manages as co-director.

== Research ==
Udry's research concentrates on economic activities in rural Sub-Saharan settings, with a particular emphasis on rural financial markets in developing countries. According to IDEAS/RePEc, he belongs to the top 2% of most cited economists. Udry's most cited research includes the following findings:

=== The use of credit as insurance in rural credit markets ===
Contrary to prevailing wisdom about credit markets in developing countries, which predicts these markets to be affected by moral hazard and adverse selection because of incomplete contracts and imperfect information, Udry finds information asymmetries between borrowers and lenders to be unimportant in rural credit markets in northern Nigeria, with information flowing freely between communities. By extension, the standard instruments used to address moral hazard and adverse selection in financial systems - collateral and interlinked contracts - are largely absent. Instead, households use credit as a form of insurance: by finetuning the repayment of loans to compensate for random production shocks affecting the borrower and/or the lender, households are able to pool risks. For example, if a borrower's household experiences an income shortfall in a given month due to e.g. an income earner being sick, the debtor household will reduce its monthly repayment.

=== Consumption smoothing with agricultural assets ===
How do farm households address the risk of income fluctuations and smooth their consumption? In northern Nigeria, Udry finds that households react to harvest shortfalls on their upland farm plots by selling their grain stocks (rather than their livestock) and prepare for such adverse shocks expected to occur in the near future by increasing their current saving. Similarly, Udry (with Marcel Fafchamps and Katherine Czukas) finds that, unlike hypothesized by the academic literature, livestock plays only a minor role in Burkinabé households' consumption smoothing, as livestock sales compensate only ca. 15-30% of the shortfall in household income attributable to village-level shocks such as droughts. More particularly, Udry finds (with Harounan Kazianga) that rural Burkinabé households appear to have been generally unable to effectively buffer their consumption against drought in 1981-85, with standard risk-coping strategies such as risk sharing and the use of assets as buffer stocks being either absent or insufficient.

=== The adoption and diffusion of agricultural technologies ===
How do farmers learn about a new agricultural technology? Studying the adoption of pineapple farming - which requires carefully calibrated agricultural inputs - in Ghana, Udry and Timothy Conley argue that farmers' adoption of pineapple farming displays social learning based on the finding that farmers imitate the input settings of those farmers in their "information neighbourhood" that have been surprisingly successful in earlier seasons. In line with the hypothesis that social learning is only displayed in the context of adopting new farming technologies, farmers don't adjust their farming inputs to imitate successful the settings of successful "information neighbours" for crops like cassava or maize whose farming technologies are established and well-known. Financially, the diffusion of pineapple farming in Ghana is driven by real rates of return ranging from 205-350% per year compared to 30-50% in maize or cassava farming; these high rates of return, coupled with an average rate of return in Ghana's overall informal sector that Udry and Santosh Anagol find to be close to 60% further substantiates the Lucas puzzle, i.e. why capital tends to flow from developing countries to developed countries despite the former having far higher rates of return than the latter.

=== Efficiency of the allocation of production inputs within households ===
Is households' agricultural production efficient, i.e. do households efficiently allocate their agricultural inputs (labour, fertilizer, etc.) across farm plots depending on its fertility? In many African households, different household members each control and farm distinct plots. Using detailed agronomic data on the inputs and returns of farm plots in rural Burkina Faso, Udry et al. document substantial inefficiencies in the allocation of agricultural production factors across plots controlled by different household members, which bear substantial implications for the design of agricultural policy in developing countries. Udry estimates the output losses that are due to these inefficiencies to amount to ca. 6% of total household production. Most importantly, these inefficiencies suggest that not only the assumption of a unitary household model but even the (less restrictive) assumption of an efficient intrahousehold allocation of production factors is likely misleading, possibly because even decisions within households may be substantially affected by imperfect information or transaction costs.

=== Risk as a determinant of agricultural investments ===
Investigating why small-scale farmers in developing countries fail to invest in activities with high expected returns such as the purchase and application of chemical fertilizer, Udry, Karlan, Osei and Osei-Akoto design an experiment in northern Ghana wherein farmers are randomly assigned to receive cash grants, opportunities to purchase or receive for free rainfall-indexed insurance, or a combination of the two. By contrast to the cash grant's small effect on agricultural investment, they find a strong demand for the insurance product and moreover observe that farmers are willing and able to invest into their farms even without the help cash grants if they are offered insurance; they thus conclude that the binding constraint on agricultural investment is uninsured risk, which can be catastrophic for farmers, and not a lack of liquidity. By extension, this implies that agricultural credit policies are unlikely to be effective in stimulating agricultural investment. Finally, Karlan et al. also show that even though there is sufficient demand to sustain a market for rainfall insurance in rural Ghana, a lack of trust, recency bias and the absence of payouts due to favourable rainfalls may erode participation in insurance markets despite its high benefits.

In another study, which analyses the impact of ambiguous and contested land rights on agricultural investment and productivity in Akuapim-Mampong, Ghana, Christopher Udry and Markus Goldstein find that investments into the fertilization of land plots and, by consequence, these plots' productivity mirror the strength of the tenure rights of the individuals in control of the different plots. In turn, the strength of an individual's tenure rights with regard to a given plot of land depends on the individual's rank in the local political hierarchy.

== Selected publications ==
- Bardhan, P., Udry, C. (1999). Development Microeconomics. Oxford: Oxford University Press.
- Conning, J., Udry, C. (2007). Rural Financial Markets in Developing Countries. In: Evenson, R., Pingali, P. (eds). Handbook of Agricultural Economics, vol. 3. Amsterdam: Elsevier, pp. 5-56.
