= The Developing Economies (journal) =

- Discipline: Social science
- Language: English
- Edited by: Shujiro Urata

Publication details
- History: 1963
- Publisher: Wiley-Blackwell
- Frequency: Quarterly
- Open access: partial
- Impact factor: 0.517 (2015)

Standard abbreviations
- ISO 4: Dev. Econ.

Indexing
- ISSN: 0012-1533 (print); 1746-1049 (web)
- LCCN: 65077293
- OCLC no.: 60616955

Links
- Journal homepage; Online access

The Developing Economies is a quarterly peer-reviewed academic journal covering developing countries' social science by applying empirical and comparative studies. It is also the official journal of the Institute of Developing Economies. The journal was published semi-annually from 1963 to 1967.

== Abstracting and indexing ==
The Developing Economies is abstracted and indexed by the following services:

- CAB Direct
- Current Contents/Social & Behavioral Sciences
- GEOBASE
- Scopus
- Social Sciences Citation Index

According to the Journal Citation Reports, the journal has a 2015 impact factor of 0.517, ranking it 47th out of 55 journals in the category "Planning & Development" and 250th out of 344 journals in the category "Economics".

== See also ==
- The World Economy (journal)
