= Verification (audit) =

Auditing process

Verification means "proving the truth" or "confirmation". Verification is an auditing process in which auditor satisfy himself with the actual existence of assets and liabilities appearing in the Statement of Financial position. Verification is usually conducted through examination of existence, ownership, title, possession, proper valuation and presence of any charge of lien over assets.

Thus, verification includes verifying:

1. The existence of the assets and liabilities.
2. Legal ownership and possession of the assets
3. Correct valuation, and
4. Ascertaining that the asset is free from any charge

Verification in an audit process can be done offsite or onsite. Offsite verification means verification by checking documents, official records, photos and by questioning staff responsible or otherwise trusted to be a reliable source for the facility in verification. Onsite verification means the verifying party is physically visiting the facility, getting introduced into due facts about it on the site where the facility is located and operated. The process may be regulated by law in certain countries.

== Objectives ==
Objectives of Verification are:

1. To show correct valuation of assets and liabilities.
2. To know whether the balance sheet exhibits a true and fair view of the state of affairs of the business
3. To find out the ownership and title of the assets
4. To find out whether assets were in existence
5. To detect frauds and errors, if any
6. To find out whether there is an adequate internal control regarding acquisition, utilization and disposal of assets.
7. To verify the arithmetic accuracy of the accounts
8. To ensure that the assets have been recorded properly
9. To know whether the assets are mentioned above is used in the company
