= Johannes Haushofer =

Economist

Academic background
- Education: University of Oxford (BA); Harvard University (PhD); University of Zurich (PhD)

Academic work
- Discipline: Development economics Behavioral economics
- Institutions: Cornell University; Stockholm University
- Awards: Frisch Medal (2024)
- Website: johanneshaushofer.com

Johannes Haushofer is an economist and professor of economics and public policy at Cornell University. His research focuses on development economics and behavioral economics, particularly poverty alleviation, cash transfers, and the relationship between economic conditions and psychological well-being.

== Education and career ==
Haushofer received a B.A. in psychology, physiology and philosophy from the University of Oxford, a Ph.D. in neurobiology from Harvard University in 2008, and a Ph.D. in economics from the University of Zurich in 2012.

From 2011 to 2014, he was a Prize Fellow in Economics at Harvard and the Massachusetts Institute of Technology. He was an assistant professor of psychology and public affairs at Princeton University from 2014 to 2020 and joined Stockholm University in 2021, becoming professor of economics there. He was the Goh Keng Swee Professor of Economics at the National University of Singapore from 2023 to 2024. In 2025, he joined Cornell University as professor of economics and public affairs while retaining a part-time professorship at Stockholm University.

Haushofer founded the Busara Center for Behavioral Economics, a research organization based in Nairobi, and Malengo, a nonprofit organization that facilitates international educational migration.

== Research ==
Haushofer's research has examined the effects of poverty and interventions intended to alleviate it. With Jeremy Shapiro, he studied unconditional cash transfers made by GiveDirectly to low-income households in Kenya, finding increases in consumption and assets as well as improvements in measures of psychological well-being.

Later work with Dennis Egger, Edward Miguel, Paul Niehaus and Michael Walker studied the broader economic effects of cash transfers across villages in rural Kenya. The study was published in Econometrica in 2022 and received the Frisch Medal in 2024.

== CV of failures ==
In 2016, Haushofer received widespread media attention after publishing a "CV of failures", listing degree programs, academic jobs, grants and journal submissions for which he had been unsuccessful. Haushofer said he published the document to counter the impression created by conventional curricula vitae, which generally display successes while omitting failures. The document was widely covered in the media.
