= Rachel Glennerster =

British economist

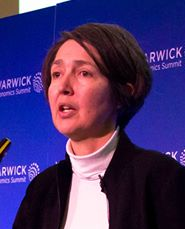
- Rachel Glennerster in 2019
- Born: 21 October 1965 (age 60)

Academic background
- Education: Somerville College, Oxford; Birkbeck College, University of London

Academic work
- Discipline: Development economics

Rachel Glennerster CMG (born 21 October 1965) is a British economist. She is an Associate Professor of Economics at the University of Chicago. She has been announced as the new president for the Center for Global Development, starting in September 2024.

Between 2018 and 2021 she served as chief economist for the Department for International Development and the Foreign, Commonwealth and Development Office.

== Education ==
Glennerster received her bachelor's of arts degree in Philosophy, Politics, and Economics from Oxford University in 1988, where she was a member of Somerville College. She then obtained a master's degree in Economics from Birkbeck College, University of London in 1995 and a doctorate in economics from the same institution in 2004.

== Career ==
Between 1988 and 1994, Glennerster worked as an economic adviser to HM Treasury in the UK government. She was a member of the UK delegation to the IMF and World Bank from 1994 to 1996, and a development associate at the Harvard Institute for International Development in 1996-97.

In 1997, Glennerster joined the International Monetary Fund (IMF), first as an economist and then as a senior economist, where she stayed until 2004. In her thirties, from 2000 to 2004, she also taught at Harvard University's Kennedy School of Government as an adjunct lecturer.

From 2004 to 2017, Glennerster was executive director of the Abdul Latif Jameel Poverty Action Lab (J-PAL) at the Massachusetts Institute of Technology (MIT). She was also the co-chair of J-PAL's agriculture sector program between 2004 and 2014, and has been the education sector co-chair since 2014.

In 2010, she became the lead academic for Sierra Leone at the International Growth Centre, a research centre based jointly at The London School of Economics and Political Science and the University of Oxford.

In 2018, Glennerster joined the Department for International Development, the UK's ministry for international development cooperation, as chief economist. In 2020, following the department's merger with the Foreign, Commonwealth and Development Office), she became their chief economist, a role she fulfilled until July 2021. She also sat on the Independent Advisory Committee on Development Impact and the executive committee.

In 2021, Glennerster joined the University of Chicago as Associate Professor of Economics in the Division of Social Science.

In 2023, Glennerster joined the Board of Trustees of Our World in Data, an open-access scientific publication focused on the world’s largest problems.

In May 2024, the Center for Global Development announced that Glennerster would be its next president, starting September 2024. She succeeded Masood Ahmed, who had led the organization for seven years. The Center for Global Development is a nonprofit think tank based in Washington, D.C., focused on international development.

== Initiatives ==
In 2007, Glennerster helped establish the Deworm the World Initiative, a program that targets increased access to education and improved health from the elimination of intestinal worms for at-risk children and has helped "deworm" millions of children worldwide.

She has been a member of Giving What We Can, an effective altruism organization whose members pledge to give 10% of their income to effective charities. She joined the initiative at its inception in 2009.

== Research ==
Glennerster's areas of research includes and focuses on randomized trials of health, education, microcredit, women’s empowerment, and governance. Geographically, her research has spanned West Africa and South Asia, including countries such as Burkina Faso, Sierra Leone, Bangladesh, India, and Pakistan.

Findings of her research include:

- Community-driven development programs, a popular strategy for foreign aid donors, have a positive short-run effect on local public goods provision and economic outcomes, but little effect on sustained improvements in collective action and inclusion of marginalized groups. This evidence is based on randomized allocation of community-driven development programs across regions in Sierra Leone (with Katherine Casey and Edward Miguel).
- A randomized evaluation on the impact of microfinance in India showed that microcredit group-based lending had little impact on consumption, health, education, women's empowerment, average business profits, starting a new business, and on average monthly expenditure per capita. Yet positive effects were found on durable goods expenditure and business investments (with Abhijit Banerjee, Esther Duflo, and Cynthia Kinnan).
- In a research of behavioral economics of complying with tuberculosis medication in Pakistan, researches measured the impact of daily SMS medication reminders of treatment outcomes to patients of tuberculosis. No impact was found between the SMS messages and patients' self-reported adherence to treatment regimes, physical health, and psychological health. This research was conducted with Aamir Khan and Shama Mohammed.
- In a 2023 study, she estimated the global losses from pandemics to be over $800 billion annually.

== Books ==
Glennerster is the coauthor of Running Randomized Evaluations, a book on running randomized impact evaluations in practice in developing countries, and Strong Medicine: Creating Incentives for Pharmaceutical Research on Neglected Diseases, a book that strategizes incentives for developers to undertake the costly research needed to develop vaccines.

Together with Michael Kremer she also authored the book Small Changes, Big Results: Behavioral Economics at Work in Poor Countries.

== Recognition and awards ==
Glennerster was appointed Companion of the Order of St Michael and St George (CMG) in the 2021 New Year Honours for services to international development.

She is cited as among the top 2% of female economists as of June 2024, according to IDEAS/RePEC.
