= Rohini Pande =

Indian economist

Academic background
- Education: London School of Economics; Oxford University; St. Stephen's College, Delhi University

Academic work
- Discipline: Development economics Political Economy; Gender Economics
- Institutions: Yale University; Harvard Kennedy School
- Awards: Carolyn Shaw Bell Award, 2018; Infosys Prize, 2022
- Website: Information at IDEAS / RePEc

Rohini Pande is an economist who is currently the Henry J. Heinz II Professor of Economics and Director of the Economic Growth Center at Yale University. She was previously the Rafik Hariri Professor of International Political Economy and Mohammed Kamal Professor of Public Policy at Harvard Kennedy School. Pande was the co-director of Center for International Development at Harvard University's Evidence for Policy Design research program (EPoD) and serves on the board of directors of the Abdul Latif Jameel Poverty Action Lab, MIT. She also serves on the board of the Bureau for Research and Economic Analysis of Development (BREAD), the Committee on the Status of Women in the Economic Profession (CSWEP) and as a co-editor of the American Economic Association's (AEA) journal American Economic Review: Insights. She is a Faculty Research Associate at NBER, CEPR and the IFPRI. Her research focuses on the economic analysis of the politics and consequences of different forms of redistribution, principally in developing countries. Her outstanding and empirical findings in fields of governance and accountability, women's empowerment, role of credit in poverty, the economic aspects of the environment and the potential of policy design in these areas, won her the Infosys Prize 2022 in Social Sciences.

== Early life and education ==
Pande was born to a public administrator father and a journalist mother and her sister is a doctor. She is a Rhodes Scholar and holds a Ph.D. as well as M.Sc. in economics from the London School of Economics. Her doctoral thesis, dated 2000, was titled The economics of public policy: Interventions in electoral representation, information transmission and investment choices. Her other educational qualifications include a M.A. in philosophy, Politics and Economics from Oxford University, and a B.A. in economics from St. Stephens College, Delhi University.

== Career ==
Pande is the Henry J. Heinz II Professor of Economics at Yale University. Until 2019, she was the Rafik Hariri Professor of International Political Economy at Harvard Kennedy School. She co-directs the Evidence for Policy Design (EPoD) Initiative. Before to joining Harvard Kennedy School, she was an associate professor of economics at Yale University and has also taught at Yale University, MIT, and Columbia University.

== Work ==
Pande's research work focuses on the economic costs and benefits of informal and formal institutions and the role of public policy in affecting change. Her work is focused in India, where she examines how institutions can be designed to empower historically disadvantaged groups; how low-cost improvements in information collection and dissemination can enable flexible regulation and more efficient outcomes in areas as diverse as environmental protection and elections; and how biased social norms, unless challenged by public policy, can worsen individual well-being and reduce economic efficiency.

=== Selected works ===
- Burgess, Robin, and Rohini Pande. "Do rural banks matter? Evidence from the Indian social banking experiment." American Economic Review 95.3 (2005): 780–795.
- Beaman, Lori, Raghabendra Chattopadhyay, Esther Duflo, Rohini Pande, and Petia Topalova. "Powerful women: does exposure reduce bias?." The Quarterly Journal of Economics 124, no. 4 (2009): 1497–1540.
- Pande, Rohini. "Can mandated political representation increase policy influence for disadvantaged minorities? Theory and evidence from India." American Economic Review 93.4 (2003): 1132–1151.
- Beaman, Lori, Esther Duflo, Rohini Pande, and Petia Topalova. "Female leadership raises aspirations and educational attainment for girls: A policy experiment in India." Science (2012): 1212382.
- Olken, Benjamin A., and Rohini Pande. "Corruption in developing countries." Annu. Rev. Econ. 4.1 (2012): 479–509.
- Duflo, Esther, and Rohini Pande. "Dams." The Quarterly Journal of Economics 122.2 (2007): 601–646.

=== Fellowships and honors ===
- 2022: Infosys Prize in Social Sciences
- 2021: Fellow, The Econometric Society
- 2018: CSWEP—Carolyn Shaw Bell Award for furthering the status of women in the Economics profession (video)
- 2012: Raymond Vernon Award for mentoring junior faculty, Harvard Kennedy School
- 2008 and 2009: Lunch on the Dean, Harvard Kennedy School teaching award
- 1998: Wingate Scholarship, New Scholar, Public Policy Programme CEPR
- 1997: Royal Economic Society Junior Research Fellowship
- 1996: Overseas Research Students Award, British Government
- 1992: Rhodes Scholarship
- Russell Sage Presidential Award (with Lena Edlund)

== External links and references ==
- Rohini Pande's website at Yale University
- Rohini Pande's website at Harvard University
- Evidence for Policy Design Program
- Poverty Action Lab
- Bureau for Research and Economic Analysis of Development
- International Food Policy Research Institute
- Committee on the Status of Women in the Economic Profession
- "Citations". Google Scholar.
- "Most widely held works by Rohini Pande". WorldCat.
