= Chris Blattman =

American economist and political scientist

Christopher Blattman is a Canadian-American economist and political scientist working on conflict, crime, and international development. He is the Ramalee E. Pearson Professor of Global Conflict Studies at the University of Chicago's Harris School of Public Policy Studies and The Pearson Institute for the Study and Resolution of Global Conflicts. He is active on Twitter as well as an early blogger on international economics and politics. He is the author of Why We Fight: The Roots of War and the Paths to Peace, published by Viking Press in 2022.

Blattman is also a research associate of the National Bureau of Economic Research, a non-resident fellow with the Center for Global Development, and a Board Member and academic lead of the Crime and Violence Section of the Abdul Latif Jameel Poverty Action Lab.

== Education ==
Blattman received a BA in Economics from the University of Waterloo. He completed a Master's in Public Administration and International Development (MPA/ID) from the Kennedy School of Government at Harvard University and a Ph.D. in economics from the University of California, Berkeley.

== Career ==
Blattman was a resident fellow at the Center for Global Development from 2007 to 2008 and a faculty member at Yale University from 2008 to 2012 before moving to Columbia University in 2012, where he became an associate professor of international affairs and political science in July 2014. He moved to The University of Chicago in 2016. He blogs on his personal website and for the Washington Post's Monkey Cage.

=== Research and writing ===
Blattman has used field experiments to argue that poor and unemployed young people in low-income countries tend to invest cash in small enterprises and thus raise their incomes. He advocated for cash transfers to the poor in a 2014 op-ed in The New York Times as well as a 2014 Foreign Affairs magazine article. This work has also been covered by National Public Radio, The New York Times, Slate, and the Financial Times.

Together with economist Stefan Dercon, Blattman ran a randomized controlled trial in Ethiopia that investigated the impact of low-skill industrial jobs. The research was covered by Our World in Data and the Financial Times.

==== Selected academic publications ====
- Blattman, Christopher, and Edward Miguel. "Civil war." Journal of Economic literature 48, no. 1 (2010): 3-57.
- Blattman, Christopher. "From violence to voting: War and political participation in Uganda." American political Science review 103, no. 2 (2009): 231-247.
- Blattman, Christopher, and Jeannie Annan. "The consequences of child soldiering." The review of economics and statistics 92, no. 4 (2010): 882-898.
- Blattman, Christopher, Nathan Fiala, and Sebastian Martinez. "Generating skilled self-employment in developing countries: Experimental evidence from Uganda." The Quarterly Journal of Economics 129, no. 2 (2014): 697-752.
- Bazzi, Samuel, and Christopher Blattman. "Economic shocks and conflict: Evidence from commodity prices." American Economic Journal: Macroeconomics 6, no. 4 (2014): 1-38.
- Bauer, Michal, Christopher Blattman, Julie Chytilová, Joseph Henrich, Edward Miguel, and Tamar Mitts. "Can war foster cooperation?." Journal of Economic Perspectives 30, no. 3 (2016): 249-74.
- Blattman, Christopher (2022). Why We Fight: The Roots of War and the Paths to Peace. New York. ISBN 978-1984881571.

== Personal ==
Blattman grew up in Ontario, Canada, in a family of bank managers. He is married to Jeannie Annan, with whom he has two children.
