= Journal of Development Economics =

- Discipline: Development economics
- Language: English

Publication details
- History: 1974-present
- Publisher: Elsevier (Netherlands)
- Frequency: Bimonthly
- Impact factor: 3.875 (2020)

Standard abbreviations
- ISO 4: J. Dev. Econ.

Indexing
- CODEN: JDECDF
- ISSN: 0304-3878
- LCCN: 76647333
- OCLC no.: 1292659

Links
- Journal homepage; Online access

The Journal of Development Economics is a bimonthly peer-reviewed academic journal published by Elsevier. It was established in 1974 and is considered the top field journal in development economics.

Its editor-in-chief from 1985 to 2003 was Pranab Bardhan, who has been the longest-serving JDE editor to date. He followed T.N. Srinivasan, and Lance Taylor as Editors since the journal was established in 1974. He was succeeded by Mark Rosenzweig (2003-2009) and Maitreesh Ghatak (2009-2015). The current editor-in-chief is Andrew Foster, who started in 2016.

== See also ==
- The Developing Economies
- The World Economy
