= American Economic Journal =

- Discipline: Economics
- Language: English

Publication details
- History: 2009–present
- Publisher: American Economic Association (United States)
- Frequency: Quarterly

Standard abbreviations
- ISO 4: Am. Econ. J.

Indexing
- AEJ: Applied Economics
- ISSN: 1945-7782 (print); 1945-7790 (web)
- AEJ: Economic Policy
- ISSN: 1945-7731 (print); 1945-774X (web)
- AEJ: Macroeconomics
- ISSN: 1945-7707 (print); 1945-7715 (web)
- AEJ: Microeconomics
- ISSN: 1945-7669 (print); 1945-7685 (web)

Links
- Journal homepage

The American Economic Journal is a group of four peer-reviewed academic journals published by the American Economic Association. The names of the individual journals consist of the prefix American Economic Journal with a descriptor of the field attached. The four field journals which started in 2009 are Applied Economics, Economic Policy, Macroeconomics, and Microeconomics.

== History ==
The American Economic Association set up an ad hoc Committee on Journals chaired by Robert Hall which in April 2006, after a three-year study of the subject, recommended that the American Economic Association (AEA) start four new field journals. One of the reasons given was that almost all other academic societies publish more than three journals, and that by adding more journals, the diversity of editors would be increased. Other reasons included the elevated pricing of field journals in economics, most of which are published by Elsevier, and the inability of The American Economic Review to deal with the large number of submissions it received.

The recommendation to publish the four new journals was approved by the executive committee of the AEA in 2006 and the publication start date was set in 2009. The president of the AEA at the time, George Akerlof, appointed a search committees for the editors of the new journals.

Although all four journals have a quarterly frequency, the American Economic Journal: Applied Economics was the only one to have four issues in 2009, its first year of publication. The other three journals had two issues in 2009 and moved to four in 2010.

== American Economic Journal: Applied Economics ==
This journal publishes papers covering in applied economics, primarily on empirical microeconomic issues. Fields for this journal include labor economics, development microeconomics, health economics, education, demography, empirical corporate finance, empirical international trade, empirical behavioral economics, and empirical political economy. This journal has established an online discussion forum at which published articles can be commented on. Esther Duflo was chosen as the first editor.

== American Economic Journal: Economic Policy ==
This journal publishes papers dealing with economic policy and its role in economic outcomes. Fields that may find an outlet in this journal include public economics, urban economics, health economics, education, welfare and political institutions, law and economics, economic regulation, and environmental economics. Alan Auerbach was chosen as the first editor. He was followed by Matthew D. Shapiro, the current editor.

== American Economic Journal: Macroeconomics ==
This journal publishes papers on macroeconomics, including aggregate fluctuations and growth, and policy related to these fields. Fields that may find an outlet in this journal include monetary theory, industrial organization, finance, labor economics, political economy, public finance, international economics, and development economics.

Olivier Blanchard was chosen as the first editor. He resigned in 2009 stating that his duties as Chief Economist of the International Monetary Fund proved incompatible with editing the journal in the context of the current financial crisis. He was replaced by Steven J. Davis. The current editor is John Leahy.

== American Economic Journal: Microeconomics ==
This journal publishes papers on microeconomic theory. Fields that may find an outlet in this journal include industrial organization, international trade, political economy, and finance. Andrew Postlewaite was chosen as the first editor.
