= Human sex ratio =

Ratio of males to females in a population

Share population female

Sex ratio by country for the population below age 15. Blue represents more boys, and red represents more girls than the world average.

Sex ratio by country for the over-65 population. Blue represents more men, and red represents more women than the world average of 0.81 males/female.

The human sex ratio is the ratio of males to females in a population in the context of anthropology and demography. In humans, the natural sex ratio at birth is slightly biased towards the male sex. It is estimated to be about 1.05 worldwide or within a narrow range from 1.03 to 1.06 males per female at birth. The sex ratio for the entire world population including all ages is approximately 101 males to 100 females as of 2024.

The sex ratios at birth and of the total population are affected by various factors including natural factors, exposure to pesticides and environmental contaminants, war casualties, effects of war on men, sex-selective abortions, infanticides, aging, gendercide, problems with birth registration, and sex differences in life expectancy.

Human sex ratios, either at birth or in the population as a whole, can be reported in any of four ways: the ratio of males to females, the ratio of females to males, the proportion of males, or the proportion of females. If there are 105,000 males and 100,000 females, the ratio of males to females is 1.05 and the proportion of males is 51.2%. Scientific literature often uses the proportion of males. This article uses the ratio of males to females, unless specified otherwise.

== Demographic observations ==
=== Fisher's principle and biology ===
Fisher's principle is an explanation of why the sex ratio of most species is approximately 1:1. Outlined by Ronald Fisher in his 1930 book, it is an argument in terms of parental expenditure. Essentially he argues that the 1:1 ratio is the evolutionarily stable strategy. Many species deviate from an even sex ratio, either periodically or permanently. Examples include parthenogenic species, periodically mating organisms such as aphids, some eusocial wasps, bees, ants, and termites.

In the evolutionary biology of sexual reproduction, the operational sex ratio is the ratio of sexually competing males that are ready to mate to sexually competing females that are ready to mate, or alternatively the local ratio of fertilizable females to sexually active males at any given time. This is different from the physical sex ratio because it does not take into account sexually inactive or non-competitive individuals (individuals that do not compete for mates).

=== Observed ratio ===
Sex ratio at birth

The sex ratio at birth is estimated to be about 1.05 males/female worldwide as of 2024 according to the CIA.

In a study around 2002, the natural sex ratio at birth was estimated to be within a narrow range of 1.03 to 1.07 males/female. Some scholars suggest that countries considered to have significant practices of prenatal sex selection are those with birth sex ratios of 1.08 and above (selection against females) and 1.02 and below (selection against males). This assumption has been questioned by some scholars.

Infant mortality is significantly higher in boys than girls in most parts of the world. Often this is explained as due to biological and genetic sex differences, with boys more biologically vulnerable to premature death and disease. Numerous preconception or prenatal environmental factors affect the probabilities of a baby being conceived male or female. It has been proposed that these environmental factors also explain sex differences in mortality.

In the United States, the yearly sex ratios at birth ranged from 1.046 to 1.059 between 1940 and 2002, with an overall decreasing trend. Among Western European countries around 2001, the ratios ranged from 1.04 in Belgium to 1.07 in Switzerland, Italy, Ireland and Portugal. In the aggregated results of 56 demographic and health surveys in African countries, the ratio is 1.03, but with considerable country-to-country variation.

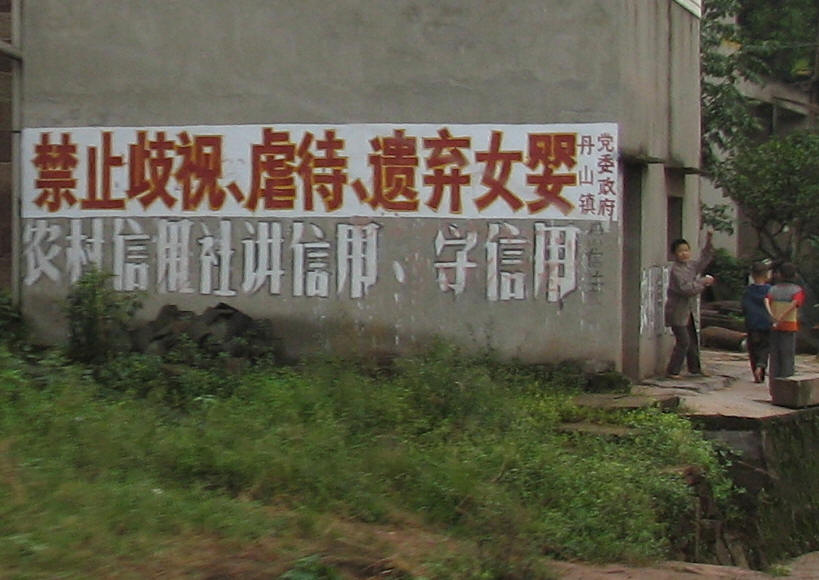
A roadside sign in rural Sichuan: "It is forbidden to discriminate against, abuse or abandon baby girls."

There is controversy about whether sex ratios outside the 1.03–1.07 range are due to sex selection, as suggested by some scholars, or due to natural causes. Some scholars, including Amartya Sen, argue that strong socioeconomic factors such as the dowry system in India and the one-child policy of China are responsible for prenatal sex selection. Others argue that an unbalanced sex ratio should not be automatically held as evidence of prenatal sex selection; Michel Garenne reports that many African nations have, over decades, had birth sex ratios below 1.00 (that is, more girls are born than boys). Angola, Botswana and Namibia have reported birth sex ratios between 0.94 and 0.99, which is quite different from the presumed "normal" sex ratio, meaning that significantly more girls have been born in such countries.

=== Data sources and data quality issues ===
For most of the 20th century in Russia (and the Soviet Union), extremely premature newborns (less than 28 weeks gestational age, or less than 1000 grams in weight, or less than 35 centimeters in length) were not counted as a live birth until they had survived for seven days; if that infant died in those first 168 hours it, would not be counted as an infant death. This led to serious underreporting of the infant mortality rate (by 22% to 25%) relative to standards recommended by the World Health Organization.

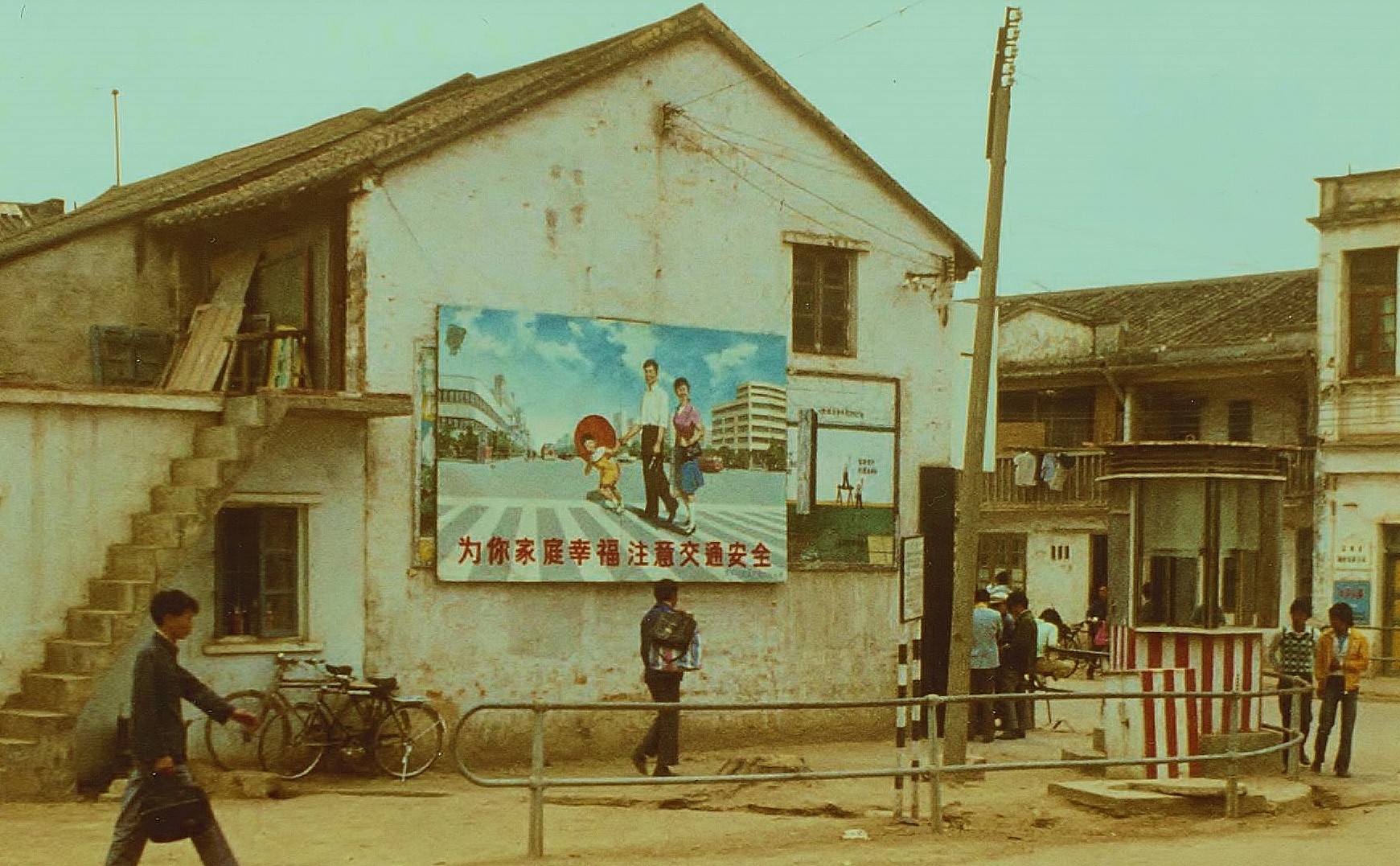
A poster from 1982 showing a Chinese family with one child

Some researchers have, in part, attributed the high sex ratios reported in mainland China in the last 25 years to the underreporting of the births of female children after the implementation of the one-child policy, though alternative explanations are now generally more widely accepted, including, above all, the use of ultrasound technology and sex-selective abortion of female fetuses and, probably to a more limited degree, neglect or in some cases infanticide of females. In the case of China, because of deficiencies in the vital statistics registration system, studies of sex ratios at birth have relied either on special fertility surveys, whose accuracy depends on full reporting of births and survival of both male and female infants, or on the national population census from which both birth rates and death rates are calculated from the household's reporting of births and deaths in the 18 months preceding the census. To the extent that this underreporting of births or deaths is sex-selective, both fertility surveys and censuses may inaccurately reflect the actual sex ratios at birth.

=== History ===
The human sex ratio at birth has been an object of study since early in the history of statistics, as it is easily recorded and a large number for sufficiently large populations. An early researcher was John Arbuthnot (1710), who in modern terms, performed statistical hypothesis testing, computing the p-value (via a sign test), interpreted it as statistical significance, and rejected the null hypothesis.

Human sex at birth was also analyzed and used as an example by Jacob Bernoulli in Ars Conjectandi (1713), in which an unequal sex ratio is a natural example of a Bernoulli trial with uneven odds. Willem 's Gravesande (1774) also studied it. Pierre-Simon Laplace (1778) used human sex ratio as an example in his development of probability theory. He considered the statistics of almost half a million births; the statistics showed an excess of boys compared to girls. He concluded by calculation of a p-value that the excess was a real, but unexplained, effect.

== Factors affecting sex ratio in humans ==
=== Natural factors ===
Scientific studies on human sex ratio are based on extensive birth and death records in Africa, the Americas, Asia, Australia, and Europe. A few of these studies extend to over 100 years of yearly human sex ratio data for some countries. These studies suggest that the human sex ratio, both at birth and as a population matures, can vary significantly according to a large number of factors, such as paternal age, maternal age, multiple births, birth order, gestation weeks, race, parent's health history, and parent's psychological stress. The trends in human sex ratio are not consistent across countries at a given time, or over time for a given country. In economically developed countries, as well as developing countries, these scientific studies have found that the human sex ratio at birth has historically varied between 0.94 and 1.15 for natural reasons. While considering the race, human sex ratio at birth is about 1.03 for Blacks and 1.06 for Whites.

In a scientific paper published in 2008, the author states that conventional assumptions have been:

- there are equal numbers of X and Y chromosomes in mammalian sperm
- X and Y stand equal chance of achieving conception
- therefore equal numbers of male and female zygotes are formed
- therefore any variation of sex ratio at birth is due to sex selection between conception and birth.

The author cautions that available scientific evidence stands against the above assumptions and conclusions. He reports that there is an excess of males at birth in almost all human populations, and the natural sex ratio at birth is usually between 1.02 and 1.08. However, the ratio may deviate significantly from this range for natural reasons.

A 2015 study showed that human sex ratio at conception is roughly 50%, but rises due to total mortality surplus of female embryos. A dataset of 139,704 embryos derived from assisted reproductive technology showed a male sex ratio of 50.2%. A dataset of 4,999 embryos from induced abortions showed a rate of 51.1% for the first trimester and 55.9% for the last two trimesters.

==== Multiple birth ====
A 1999 study reported the sex ratio for 815,891 children born in Denmark between 1980 and 1993. They studied the birth records to identify the effects of multiple birth, birth order, age of parents and the sexes of preceding siblings on the proportion of males using contingency tables, chi-squared tests and regression analysis. The secondary sex ratio decreased with increasing number of children per plural birth and with paternal age, whereas no significant independent effect was observed for maternal age, birth order, or other natural factors.

==== Length of gestation ====
A 2009 study reported the sex ratio derived from data in United States birth records over a 25-year period (1981–2006). This paper reports that the sex ratio at birth for the white ethnic group in the United States was 1.04 when the gestational age was 33–36 weeks, but 1.15 for gestational ages of less than 28 weeks, 28–32 weeks, and 37 or more weeks. This study also found that the sex ratios at birth in the United States, between 1981 and 2006, were lower in both black and Hispanic ethnic groups when compared with non-Hispanic white ethnic group.

A 2010 study found that sex ratio does not seem to change significantly with either maternal or paternal age. Neither gravidity nor parity seem to affect the male-to-female ratio. However, there is a significant association of sex ratio with the length of gestation. These conclusions have been disputed, due to suggestions that the results are based on some demographic variables and a small data set, a broader study of variables and larger population set suggests human sex ratio shows substantial variation for various reasons and different trend effects of length of gestation than those reported.

=== Environmental factors ===
==== Effects of climate change ====
High temperature raises proportion of male births, but the reasons for this are disputed. Women subjected to colder weather abort frail male fetuses in greater proportion, thereby lowering birth sex ratios. Cold weather stressors also extend male longevity, thereby raising the human sex ratio at older ages. A 1 °C increase in annual temperature predicts one more male than expected for every 1,000 females born in a year. A 2009 study on 138 years of human birth sex ratio data, from 1865 to 2003, found an increased excess of male births during periods of exogenous stress (World War II) and during warm years. In the warmest period over the 138 years, the birth sex ratio peaked at about 1.08 in Northern Europe.

==== Effects of gestation environment ====
Causes of stress during gestation, such as maternal malnutrition, generally appear to increase fetal deaths, particularly among males, resulting in a lower sex ratio at birth. A higher incidence of Hepatitis B virus in a population is believed to increase the sex ratio, while some unexplained environmental health hazards are thought to have the opposite effect.

The effects of gestational environment on human sex ratio are complicated and unclear, with numerous conflicting reports. For example, a 2008 study found no effect on birth sex ratio from hepatitis B presence in either mothers or fathers in Chinese populations.

==== Effects of chemical pollution ====
A comparison of the structures of the natural hormone estradiol (left) and one of the nonyl-phenols (right), an endocrine disruptor

A 2007 survey by the Arctic Monitoring and Assessment Program noted abnormally low sex ratios in Russian Arctic villages and Inuit villages in Greenland and Canada, and attributed this imbalance to high levels of endocrine disruptors in the blood of inhabitants, including PCBs and DDT. These chemicals are believed to have accumulated in the tissues of fish and animals that make up the bulk of these populations' diets. Some studies have found that certain kinds of environmental pollution, specifically dioxins, are associated with a lower sex ratio.

Other scientific studies suggest that environmental effects on human sex ratio at birth are either limited or not properly understood. A 1999 study from Finland's National Public Health Institute reports the effect of environmental chemicals and changes in sex ratio over 250 years in Finland. It evaluated whether Finnish long-term data are compatible with the hypothesis that the decrease in the ratio of male to female births in industrial countries is caused by environmental factors. They analyzed the sex ratio of births from the files of Statistics Finland and all live births in Finland from 1751 to 1997. They found an increase in the proportion of males from 1751 to 1920; this was followed by a decrease and interrupted by peaks in births of males during and after World War I and World War II. None of the natural factors such as paternal age, maternal age, age difference of parents or birth order could explain the time trends. They found that the peak sex ratio precedes the period of industrialization and the introduction of pesticides or hormonal drugs, rendering a causal association between environmental chemicals and human sex ratio at birth unlikely. Moreover, these scientists claim that the trends they found in Finland are similar to those observed in other countries with higher levels of pollution and much greater pesticide use.

Summary of environmental exposures and the sex ratio at birth
| Chemical | Over father | Over mother | Over both parents | Reference |
|---|---|---|---|---|
| Dioxins | some evidence for more girls | | limited evidence for more girls | |
| PCBs | some evidence for more boys | | limited evidence for more boys | |
| DBCP | limited evidence for more girls | | | |
| Lead | limited evidence for more girls | | | |
| Methylmercury | limited evidence for more girls | | | |
| Boron | limited evidence for more girls | | | |

It is important to exclude alternative explanations, including social ones, when examining large human populations whose composition by ethnicity and race may be changing. Other factors that could possibly affect the sex ratio include:

- Social status of the mother, known to be a factor in influencing the sex ratio of certain animals such as swine, but apparently not in humans.
- Whether the mother has a partner may have a small effect on sex ratio, with a 2004 study of 84,500 births finding 51.5% male births among women living with a partner, and 49.9% in women who were not.
- Latitude, with countries near the equator producing more females than near the poles.

=== Social factors ===
==== Population composition ====
A 2005 study of California, where declining sex ratios had been observed, observed "In the raw data, the male birth proportion is indeed declining. However, during this period, there were also shifts in demographics that influence the sex ratio. Controlling for birth order, parents' age, and race/ethnicity, different trends emerged. White births (which account for over 80%) continued to show a statistically significant decline, while other racial groups showed non-statistically significant declines (Japanese-American, Native American, other), with little or no change (Black American), or an increase (Chinese-American). Finally, when the white births were divided into Hispanic and non-Hispanic (possible since 1982), it was found that both white subgroups suggest an increase in male births." They concluded "that the decline in male births in California is largely attributable to changes in demographics."

==== Effects of war ====
Increased sex ratio during and after a war is called the returning soldier effect. There is still no clear explanation of its mechanics.

==== Early marriage and parents' age ====
A 1985 study of 1.67 million births in 33 states in the United States and a 1999 study of 820,000 births in Denmark found that maternal age has no statistically significant role on the human birth sex ratio. However, they report a significant effect of paternal age. Significantly more male babies were born per 1000 female babies to younger fathers than to older fathers. These studies suggest that social factors such as early marriage and males siring their children at a young age may play a role in raising birth sex ratios in certain societies.

==== Partnership status ====
A 2004 study of 86,436 human births from a US population-based survey showed that 51.4% boys were born among married parents living together, 52.2% among unmarried parents living together and only 49.9% boys among parents living apart.

=== Economic factors ===
A 2003 study examined the hypothesis that population stress induced by a declining economy reduces the human sex ratio. It compared the sex ratio in East and West Germany for the years 1946 to 1999, with genetically similar populations. The population stressors theory predicts that the East German sex ratio should have been lower than expected in 1991, when East Germany's economy collapsed, than in previous years. The hypothesis further suggests that, over time, East German birth sex ratios should generally be lower than the observed sex ratios found in West Germany for the same years. According to the study, the birth sex ratio data from East Germany and West Germany over 45 years support the hypothesis. The sex ratio in East Germany was also at its lowest in 1991. According to the study, assuming women in East Germany did not opt to abort male fetuses more than female fetuses, the best hypothesis is that a collapsing economy lowers the human birth sex ratio, while a booming economy raises the birth sex ratio. The publication notes that these trends may be related to the observed trend of an elevated occurrence of very low birth-weight babies from maternal stress, during certain macroeconomic circumstances.

=== Sex-selective abortion and infanticide ===
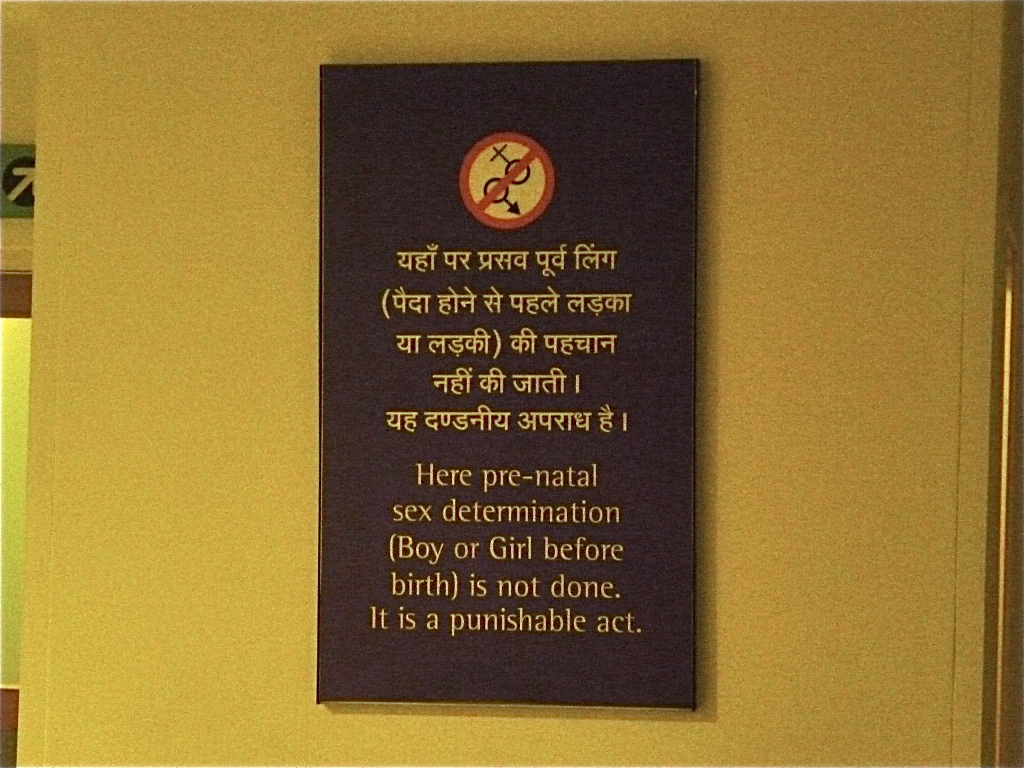
Sign in an Indian hospital stating that prenatal sex determination is not done there and is illegal

Sex-selective abortion and infanticide are thought to significantly skew the naturally occurring ratio in some populations, such as China, where the introduction of ultrasound scans in the late 1980s has led to a birth sex ratio (males to females) of 1.181 (2010 official census data for China). The 2011 India census reports India's sex ratio in the 0–6 age bracket at 1.088.

The 2011 birth sex ratios for China and India are significantly above the mean ratio recorded in the United States from 1940 through 2002 (1.051); however, their birth sex ratios are within the 0.98–1.14 range observed in the United States for major ethnic groups over the same time period. Along with Asian countries, a number of European, Middle Eastern, and Latin American countries have reported high birth sex ratios in the 1.06 to 1.14 range. High birth sex ratios, according to some studies, can be caused in part by social factors.

Another hypothesis has been inspired by the persistent high birth sex ratios observed in Georgia and Armenia—both predominantly Orthodox Christian societies—and Azerbaijan, a predominantly Muslim society. Since their independence from the Soviet Union, the birth sex ratio in these Caucasus countries has risen sharply, to between 1.11 and 1.20, among the world's highest. Mesle et al. consider the hypothesis that the high birth sex ratio may be because of the social trend of more than two children per family, and birth order possibly affects the sex ratio in this region of the world. They also consider the hypothesis that sons are preferred in these countries of the Caucasus, the spread of scans and there being a practice of sex-selective abortion; however, the scientists admit that they do not have definitive proof that sex-selective abortion is actually happening or that there are no natural reasons for the persistently high birth sex ratios.

=== Disparate gendered access to resources ===
There is evidence that some of the variation in global sex ratios is due to disparate access to resources. As MacPherson (2007) notes, there can be significant differences in gender violence and access to food, healthcare, immunizations between male and female children. This leads to high infant and childhood mortality among girls, which causes changes in sex ratio.

Disparate, gendered access to resources appears to be strongly linked to socioeconomic status. Specifically, poorer families are sometimes forced to ration food, with daughters typically receiving less priority than sons. However, Klasen's 2001 study revealed that this practice is less common in the poorest families, but rises dramatically in the slightly less poor families. Klasen and Wink's 2003 study suggests that this is "related to greater female economic independence and fewer cultural strictures among the poorest sections of the population". In other words, the poorest families are typically less bound by cultural expectations and norms, and women tend to have more freedom to become family breadwinners out of necessity.

Increased sex ratios can be caused by disparities in aspects of life other than vital resources. According to Sen (1990), differences in wages and job advancement also have a dramatic effect on sex ratios. This is why high sex ratios are sometimes seen in nations with little sex-selective abortion. Additionally, high female education rates are correlated with lower sex ratios (World Bank 2011).

Lopez and Ruzikah (1983) found that, when given the same resources, women tend to outlive men at all stages of life after infancy. However, globally, resources are not always allocated equitably. Thus, some scholars argue that disparities in access to resources such as healthcare, education, and nutrition play at least a small role in the high sex ratios seen in some parts of the world. For example, Alderman and Gerter (1997) found that unequal access to healthcare is a primary cause of female death in developing nations, especially in Southeast Asia. Moreover, in India, lack of equal access to healthcare has led to increased disease and higher rates of female mortality in every age group until the late thirties (Sen 1990). This is particularly noteworthy because, in regions of the world where women receive equal resources, women tend to outlive men (Sen 1990). Women outlive men in all but 2 countries.

Economic disadvantage alone may not always lead to increased sex ratio, claimed Sen in 1990. For example, in sub-Saharan Africa, one of the most economically disadvantaged regions of the world, there is an excess of women. So, if economic disadvantage is uncorrelated with sex ratio in Africa, some other factor(s) may be at play. More detailed analysis of African demographics, in 2002, suggests that Africa too has wide variation in birth sex ratios (from 1.01 in Bantu populations of East Africa to 1.08 in Nigeria and Ethiopia). Thus economic disadvantage remains a possible unresolved hypothesis for Africa as well.

== Consequences of different sex ratios ==
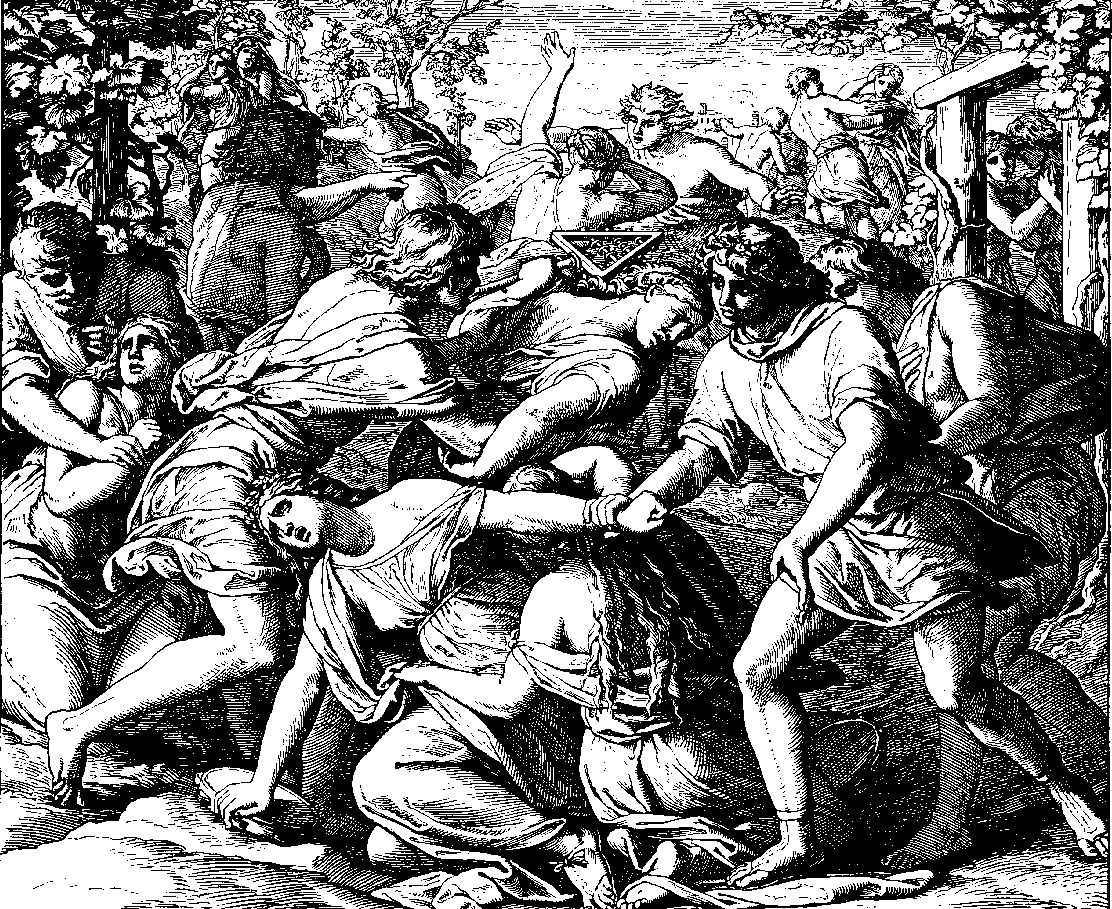
Benjaminites seize wives from Shiloh in this 1860 woodcut by Julius Schnorr von Karolsfeld. There were not enough women available for marriage due to the high losses in the Battle at Gibeah.

There are several social consequences of an imbalanced sex ratio. It may also become a factor in societal and demographic collapse. For example, the native population of Cusco, Peru at the time of the Spanish conquest was stressed by an imbalance in the sex ratio between men and women. Analyses of how sex ratio imbalances affect personal consumption and intra-household distribution were pioneered by Gary Becker, Shoshana Grossbard-Shechtman, and Marcia Guttentag and Paul Secord.

High ratios of males have a positive effect on marital fertility and women's share of household consumption, and negative effects on non-marital cohabitation and fertility and women's labor supply. It has been shown that the labor supply of married women in the U.S., over time, varies inversely with the sex ratio.

=== Case of missing women ===
- Societies with fewer women tend to have low rates of literacy and female workforce participation.
- The lack of women in Taiwan has led many Taiwanese men to procure brides from other countries such as Vietnam via matchmaking agencies. Ill-treatment of the brides led the Vietnamese government to crack down on the trade in the 2000s, pushing it underground.
- Following the one-child policy, the lack of women in China has helped prostitution to flourish. Many women were purchased or kidnapped in other countries for that purpose.
- Surplus men constitute a bridging population for the propagation of the AIDS pandemic, transferring HIV from high-risk to low-risk people. This has helped the virus spread in Africa and Asia.

=== Missing women and crime ===
A 2022 study used 2021 National Archive of Criminal Justice data and 2016 U.S. Census Bureau data to show the impact of different gender ratios on men's violence against women in 3,165 U.S. cities and counties. The sex ratio ranged from 40% men to 60% men in the data. Rates of violence were lowest in places with a 51% male ratio. For lower and higher proportions of males, the more the ratio deviated from the average, the higher was the violence.

A study of Chinese provinces found that an increase of the human sex ratio by 1% resulted in an increase of the crime rate by 5-6%.

== Countries with imbalances in sex ratio ==
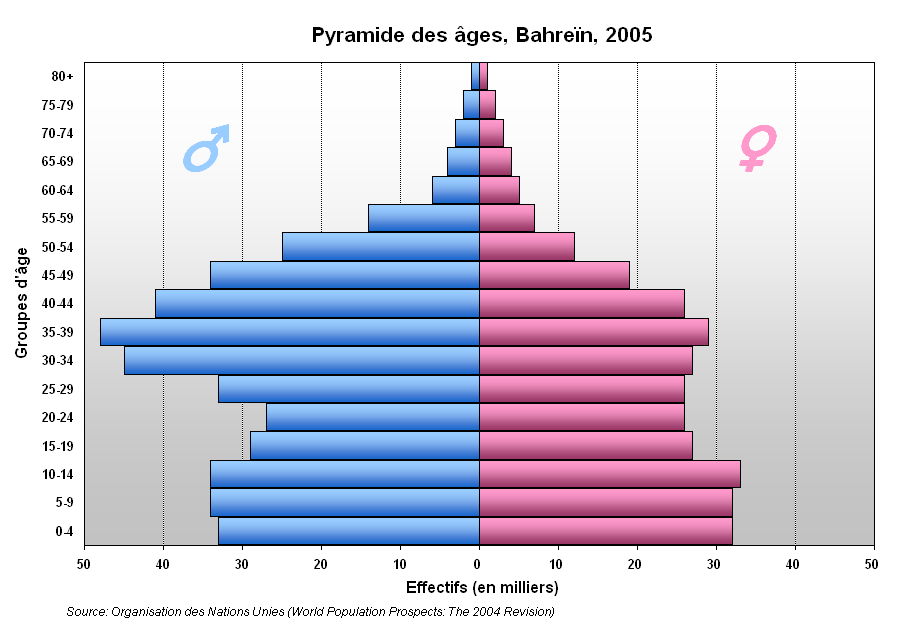
Sex imbalance in Bahrain caused by policies that restrict female spouses and children of immigrant workers

Some countries have a significant disparity between males and females in their population. As stated above, males usually exceed females at birth but subsequently experience different mortality rates due to many possible causes such as differential natural death rates, and increased accidental and violent deaths (including war).

Countries with significant imbalances tend to have three characteristics in common. First, a rapid decline in fertility, either because of preference for smaller families or to comply with their nation's population control measures. Second, there is social pressure for women to give birth to sons, often because of a cultural preference for male heirs. Third, families have widespread access to technology to selectively abort female foetuses.

Some of the factors suggested as causes of this sex imbalance are sex-selective abortion and infanticide, large-scale migration, and behavioral factors statistically linked with sex ratio, such as excessive drinking and violence. Gender imbalance may result in the threat of social unrest, especially in the case of an excess of low-status young males unable to find spouses, and being recruited into the service of militaristic political factions. Economic factors such as male-majority industries and activities, such as the petrochemical, agriculture, engineering, military, and technology industries, have also contributed to an imbalance toward males in some areas dependent on these industries.

A 2007 study found that the male-to-female sex ratio in the German state of Bavaria fell as low as 0.60 after the end of World War II for the most severely affected age cohort (those between 21 and 23 years old in 1946). This same study found that out-of-wedlock births spiked from approximately 10–15% during the inter-war years up to 22% at the end of the war. This increase in out-of-wedlock births was attributed to a change in the marriage market caused by the decline in the sex ratio.

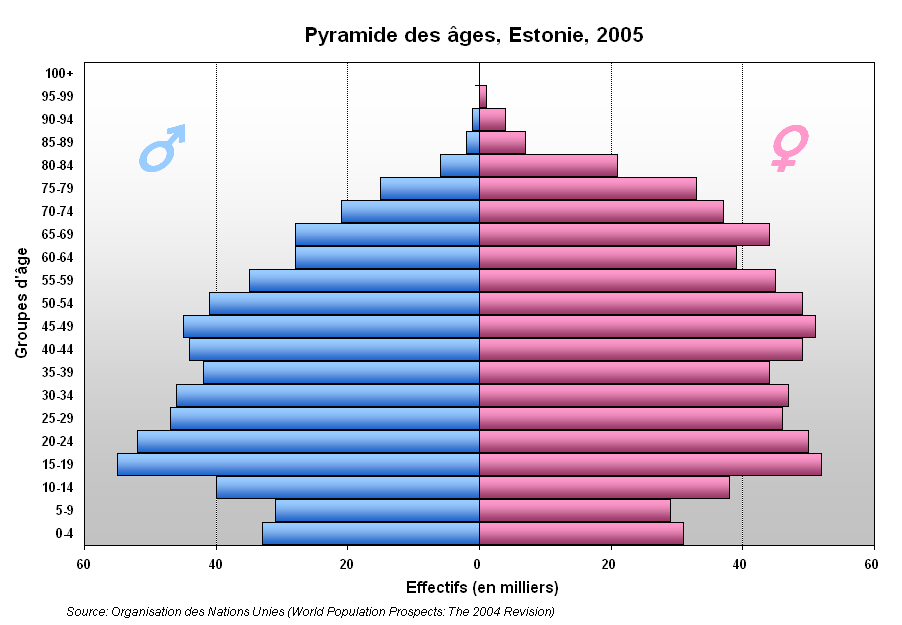
Sex imbalance in Estonia

The value for the entire world population is 1.01 males/female, with 1.05 at birth, 1.05 for those under 15, 1.03 for those between 15 and 64, and 0.81 for those over 65 as of 2024.

Qatar has the highest male-to-female ratio amongst the whole population, with 3.32 males/female as of 2024. For the group aged below 15, British Virgin Islands, Malawi and Saint Martin have the lowest male-to-female ratio with 0.98–0.99 males/female, and Liechtenstein has the highest male-to-female ratio with 1.25 males/female in that age group.

Countries on the Arabian Peninsula tend to have a 'natural' ratio of about 1.05 at birth but a very high ratio of males for those over 65 (Saudi Arabia 1.14, Arab Emirates 2.73, Qatar 2.84), indicating either an above-average mortality rate for females or a below-average mortality for males, or, more likely in this case, a large population of aging male guest workers. Conversely, countries of Northern and Eastern Europe (the Baltic states, Belarus, Ukraine, Russia) tend to have a 'normal' ratio at birth but a very low ratio of males among those over 65 (Russia 0.46, Latvia 0.48, Ukraine 0.52); similarly, Armenia has an above average male ratio at birth (1.17), and a below-average male ratio above 65 (0.67). The latter may be caused by emigration and higher male mortality as a result of higher Soviet-era deaths; it may also be related to the enormous (by western standards) rate of alcoholism in the former Soviet states. Another contributory factor is an aging population, given that due to higher differential mortality rates, the ratio of males to females declines with age.

== See also ==
- Gender parity
- Operational sex ratio
- Returning soldier effect
- Sex selection
- Sex-selective abortion
- Surplus women
- Missing women

Countries:

- List of sovereign states by sex ratio
- Lost boys (Mormon fundamentalism)
- Sex-ratio imbalance in China
- Sex ratio in India
