= List of countries by sex ratio =

Sex ratio by country for total population as of (2020). Red indicates countries with more women, and blue indicates countries with more men.

The human sex ratio is the comparative number of males with respect to each female in a population. This is a list of sex ratios by country or region.

== Methodology ==
The table's data is from The World Factbook unless noted otherwise. It shows the male to female sex ratio by the Central Intelligence Agency of the United States. If there is a discrepancy between The World Factbook and a country's census data, the latter may be used instead.

A ratio above 1, for example 1.1, means there are more males than females (1.1 males for every female). A ratio below 1, for example 0.8, means there are more females than males (0.8 males for every female). A ratio of 1 means there are equal numbers of males and females.

== Countries ==
The World Factbook (2024 estimates)
Location	At birth	0–14 years	15–64 years	Over 65 years	Total
World	1.05	1.05	1.03	0.81	1.01
Afghanistan	1.05	1.03	1.03	0.85	1.02
Albania	1.06	1.09	0.97	0.85	0.97
Algeria	1.05	1.05	1.03	0.96	1.03
American Samoa (US)	1.06	1.07	0.97	0.88	0.99
Andorra	1.06	1.06	1.05	1.03	1.05
Angola	1.03	1.01	0.93	0.72	0.96
Anguilla (UK)	1.03	1.03	0.83	0.93	0.88
Antigua and Barbuda	1.05	1.03	0.87	0.74	0.89
Argentina	1.07	1.06	1.01	0.74	0.98
Armenia	1.07	1.10	0.99	0.71	0.96
Aruba (Netherlands)	1.02	1.01	0.93	0.68	0.90
Australia	1.06	1.07	1.01	0.85	0.99
Austria	1.05	1.05	1.00	0.79	0.96
Azerbaijan	1.15	1.15	1.00	0.72	1.00
Bahamas, The	1.03	0.90	0.86	0.81	0.86
Bahrain	1.03	1.03	1.68	1.06	1.50
Bangladesh	1.04	1.04	0.95	0.87	0.96
Barbados	1.01	1.00	0.97	0.73	0.93
Belarus	1.06	1.06	0.96	0.51	0.88
Belgium	1.05	1.05	1.02	0.80	0.97
Belize	1.05	1.03	0.96	0.99	0.98
Benin	1.05	1.02	0.94	0.84	0.97
Bermuda (UK)	1.05	1.05	1.01	0.74	0.95
Bhutan	1.05	1.05	1.08	1.06	1.07
Bolivia	1.05	1.04	1.02	0.86	1.01
Bosnia and Herzegovina	1.07	1.07	1.01	0.70	0.95
Botswana	1.03	1.02	0.91	0.66	0.92
Brazil	1.05	1.04	0.98	0.75	0.97
Brunei	1.05	1.06	0.91	0.94	0.95
Bulgaria	1.06	1.06	1.04	0.67	0.95
Burkina Faso	1.03	1.03	0.93	0.73	0.96
Burundi	1.03	1.02	0.98	0.76	0.99
Cambodia	1.04	1.02	0.95	0.55	0.94
Cameroon	1.03	1.02	0.98	0.87	0.99
Canada	1.05	1.06	1.01	0.85	0.98
Cape Verde	1.03	1.01	0.96	0.62	0.95
Cayman Islands (UK)	1.02	1.01	0.96	0.84	0.95
Central African Republic	1.03	1.05	0.97	0.79	0.99
Chad	1.04	1.02	0.96	0.75	0.98
Chile	1.04	1.04	1.00	0.73	0.97
China	1.09	1.14	1.06	0.86	1.04
Colombia	1.05	1.05	0.96	0.78	0.95
Comoros	1.03	1.00	0.92	0.77	0.94
Congo DR	1.03	1.01	1.00	0.78	1.00
Congo	1.03	1.02	1.01	0.75	1.00
Cook Islands (New Zealand)	1.04	1.10	1.06	0.96	1.05
Costa Rica	1.05	1.05	1.02	0.84	1.00
Croatia	1.06	1.07	1.00	0.71	0.93
Cuba	1.06	1.06	1.01	0.82	0.99
Curacao (Netherlands)	1.05	1.05	0.98	0.67	0.93
Cyprus	1.05	1.05	1.11	0.77	1.05
Czechia	1.05	1.05	1.05	0.71	0.97
Denmark	1.07	1.05	1.03	0.86	0.99
Djibouti	1.03	1.01	0.77	0.77	0.83
Dominica	1.05	1.05	1.04	0.91	1.02
Dominican Republic	1.04	1.03	1.03	0.93	1.02
Ecuador	1.05	1.05	0.97	0.81	0.97
Egypt	1.06	1.06	1.06	1.03	1.06
El Salvador	1.05	1.05	0.90	0.74	0.92
Equatorial Guinea	1.03	1.07	1.22	1.09	1.16
Eritrea	1.03	1.01	0.97	0.66	0.97
Estonia	1.05	1.05	1.02	0.55	0.89
Eswatini (Swaziland)	1.03	1.00	0.87	0.59	0.90
Ethiopia	1.03	1.01	0.99	0.82	0.99
European Union	1.06	1.05	1.01	0.77	0.95
Faroe Islands (Denmark)	1.07	1.07	1.12	0.93	1.07
Fiji	1.05	1.04	1.05	0.86	1.03
Finland	1.05	1.05	1.03	0.79	0.97
France	1.05	1.05	1.01	0.79	0.96
French Polynesia (France)	1.05	1.06	1.06	0.93	1.05
Gabon	1.03	1.02	1.11	1.03	1.07
Gambia, The	1.03	1.02	0.97	0.78	0.98
Gaza Strip/Palestine	1.06	1.06	1.01	1.05	1.03
Georgia	1.07	1.06	0.95	0.65	0.92
Germany	1.05	1.04	1.03	0.81	0.98
Ghana	1.03	1.02	0.93	0.81	0.96
Gibraltar (UK)	1.05	1.05	1.02	0.93	1.01
Greece	1.07	1.06	1.00	0.80	0.96
Greenland (Denmark)	1.05	1.03	1.07	1.13	1.07
Grenada	1.10	1.09	1.04	0.90	1.03
Guam (US)	1.07	1.07	1.10	0.88	1.06
Guatemala	1.05	1.04	0.97	0.80	0.98
Guernsey (UK)	1.05	1.06	1.02	0.87	0.99
Guinea	1.03	1.02	1.00	0.83	1.00
Guinea-Bissau	1.03	1.01	0.93	0.71	0.96
Guyana	1.05	1.04	1.08	0.78	1.04
Haiti	1.01	1.00	0.97	0.77	0.97
Honduras	1.03	1.02	0.91	0.77	0.93
Hong Kong (China)	1.06	1.10	0.81	0.86	0.86
Hungary	1.06	1.10	1.03	0.69	0.95
Iceland	1.05	1.04	1.02	0.90	1.00
India	1.10	1.11	1.07	0.85	1.06
Indonesia	1.05	1.05	1.00	0.85	1.00
Iran	1.05	1.05	1.04	0.87	1.03
Iraq	1.05	1.04	1.01	0.80	1.02
Ireland	1.06	1.04	0.98	0.89	0.98
Isle of Man (UK)	1.08	1.08	1.04	0.89	1.01
Israel	1.05	1.05	1.04	0.84	1.01
Italy	1.06	1.05	0.97	0.79	0.93
Ivory Coast	1.03	1.01	1.02	0.82	1.01
Jamaica	1.05	1.04	0.97	0.91	0.98
Japan	1.06	1.06	1.01	0.79	0.95
Jersey (UK)	1.06	1.06	1.03	0.75	0.98
Jordan	1.06	1.06	1.13	0.95	1.10
Kazakhstan	1.07	1.06	0.96	0.56	0.94
Kenya	1.02	1.01	1.00	0.84	1.00
Kiribati	1.05	1.04	0.93	0.63	0.94
Korea, North	1.06	1.05	1.00	0.59	0.95
Korea, South	1.05	1.05	1.07	0.79	1.01
Kosovo	1.08	1.08	1.10	0.78	1.06
Kuwait	1.05	1.09	1.51	0.74	1.36
Kyrgyzstan	1.07	1.06	0.96	0.62	0.96
Laos	1.04	1.03	0.99	0.87	1.00
Latvia	1.05	1.06	0.98	0.52	0.87
Lebanon	1.05	1.05	1.02	0.76	1.00
Lesotho	1.03	1.01	1.00	0.59	0.98
Liberia	1.03	1.01	0.99	0.87	1.00
Libya	1.05	1.04	1.05	0.82	1.04
Liechtenstein	1.05	1.05	1.00	0.85	0.97
Lithuania	1.06	1.06	0.96	0.53	0.86
Luxembourg	1.06	1.06	1.05	0.85	1.02
Macau (China)	1.05	1.05	0.87	0.89	0.90
Madagascar	1.03	1.02	1.01	0.86	1.01
Malawi	1.01	0.99	0.96	0.80	0.96
Malaysia	1.07	1.06	1.06	0.94	1.05
Maldives	1.05	1.04	1.06	0.77	1.04
Mali	1.03	1.01	0.89	0.97	0.95
Malta	1.04	1.06	1.07	0.86	1.02
Marshall Islands	1.05	1.04	1.03	0.95	1.03
Mauritania	1.03	1.01	0.90	0.73	0.93
Mauritius	1.07	1.04	0.99	0.71	0.95
Mexico	1.05	1.06	0.95	0.75	0.96
Micronesia	1.05	1.03	0.94	0.79	0.96
Moldova	1.07	1.00	0.94	0.62	0.89
Monaco	1.04	1.05	1.02	0.80	0.93
Mongolia	1.05	1.04	0.94	0.67	0.95
Montenegro	1.04	1.06	1.00	0.78	0.96
Montserrat (UK)	1.03	1.06	0.98	1.00	1.00
Morocco	1.05	1.04	0.99	0.95	1.00
Mozambique	1.03	1.03	0.93	0.97	0.97
Myanmar (Burma)	1.06	1.05	0.97	0.77	0.97
Namibia	1.03	1.02	0.95	0.76	0.97
Nauru	1.04	1.04	0.97	0.49	0.96
Nepal	1.06	1.06	0.93	0.95	0.96
Netherlands	1.05	1.05	1.02	0.87	0.99
New Caledonia (France)	1.05	1.04	1.01	0.77	0.99
New Zealand	1.05	1.06	1.02	0.88	1.00
Nicaragua	1.05	1.04	0.95	0.80	0.96
Niger	1.03	1.02	0.95	0.92	0.98
Nigeria	1.06	1.04	1.01	0.88	1.02
North Macedonia	1.07	1.07	1.03	0.79	0.99
Northern Mariana Islands (US)	1.17	1.16	1.11	1.12	1.12
Norway	1.05	1.05	1.05	0.90	1.02
Oman	1.05	1.05	1.24	0.87	1.16
Pakistan	1.05	1.04	1.05	0.87	1.04
Palau	1.06	1.07	1.25	0.33	1.06
Panama	1.06	1.06	1.02	0.87	1.02
Papua New Guinea	1.05	1.04	1.02	0.97	1.10
Paraguay	1.05	1.04	1.01	0.91	1.00
Peru	1.05	1.04	0.96	0.75	0.96
Philippines	1.05	1.04	1.02	0.66	1.00
Poland	1.06	1.06	0.96	0.67	0.91
Portugal	1.05	1.05	0.97	0.66	0.90
Puerto Rico (US)	1.06	1.04	0.92	0.75	0.89
Qatar	1.02	1.02	4.29	1.91	3.32
Romania	1.06	1.06	1.00	0.70	0.93
Russia	1.06	1.06	0.95	0.52	0.87
Rwanda	1.03	1.02	0.95	0.67	0.96
Saint Barthelemy (France)	1.06	1.06	1.17	1.01	1.12
Saint Helena, Ascension and Tristan da Cunha (UK)	1.06	1.04	0.99	1.03	1.00
Saint Kitts and Nevis	1.02	1.01	1.02	0.91	1.00
Saint Lucia	1.06	1.06	0.94	0.83	0.94
Saint Martin (France)	1.04	0.99	0.92	0.75	0.92
Saint Pierre and Miquelon (France)	1.06	1.05	0.97	0.78	0.93
Saint Vincent and the Grenadines	1.03	1.02	1.06	0.94	1.04
Samoa	1.05	1.07	1.04	0.81	1.03
San Marino	1.09	1.10	0.94	0.83	0.93
Sao Tome and Principe	1.03	1.03	0.99	0.75	1.00
Saudi Arabia	1.05	1.04	1.42	1.14	1.31
Senegal	1.05	1.04	0.94	0.76	0.97
Serbia	1.06	1.06	1.01	0.71	0.95
Seychelles	1.03	1.06	1.14	0.76	1.08
Sierra Leone	1.03	1.02	0.96	0.97	0.98
Singapore	1.05	1.07	1.01	0.87	1.00
Sint Maarten (Netherlands)	1.05	1.07	0.98	0.86	0.98
Slovakia	1.07	1.09	0.98	0.67	0.93
Slovenia	1.04	1.05	1.09	0.78	1.00
Solomon Islands	1.05	1.06	1.05	0.89	1.04
Somalia	1.03	1.00	1.04	0.76	1.01
South Africa	1.02	1.00	0.98	0.73	0.96
South Sudan	1.05	1.04	1.03	1.22	1.04
Spain	1.05	1.04	1.00	0.76	0.95
Sri Lanka	1.05	1.05	0.95	0.73	0.94
Sudan	1.05	1.03	0.99	1.07	1.01
Suriname	1.07	1.03	1.00	0.70	0.98
Sweden	1.06	1.06	1.05	0.88	1.01
Switzerland	1.05	1.05	1.02	0.85	0.99
Syria	1.06	1.05	0.99	0.88	1.01
Taiwan	1.06	1.06	1.00	0.82	0.97
Tajikistan	1.05	1.04	1.00	0.81	1.01
Tanzania	1.03	1.02	1.00	0.74	1.00
Thailand	1.05	1.05	0.96	0.80	0.95
Timor-Leste	1.07	1.06	0.96	0.92	0.99
Togo	1.03	1.03	0.96	0.71	0.97
Tonga	1.03	1.03	1.02	0.83	1.01
Trinidad and Tobago	1.04	1.04	1.04	0.87	1.01
Tunisia	1.06	1.06	0.97	0.90	0.98
Turkey	1.05	1.05	1.03	0.83	1.01
Turkmenistan	1.05	1.03	0.99	0.78	0.98
Turks and Caicos Islands (UK)	1.05	1.04	1.01	0.94	1.01
Tuvalu	1.05	1.05	1.02	0.57	0.98
Uganda	1.03	1.03	0.90	0.74	0.95
Ukraine	1.06	1.07	1.12	0.53	0.97
United Arab Emirates	1.06	1.05	2.47	3.25	2.13
United Kingdom	1.05	1.05	1.02	0.85	0.99
United States	1.05	1.05	1.00	0.81	0.97
Uruguay	1.04	1.04	0.99	0.68	0.94
Uzbekistan	1.08	1.07	1.00	0.79	1.01
Vanuatu	1.05	1.04	0.96	0.96	0.99
Venezuela	1.05	1.05	0.99	0.84	0.99
Vietnam	1.10	1.12	1.02	0.69	1.01
Virgin Islands (UK)	1.05	0.98	0.89	0.90	0.90
Virgin Islands (US)	1.06	1.05	0.90	0.81	0.90
Wallis and Futuna (France)	1.05	1.09	1.05	1.02	1.06
West Bank/Palestine	1.06	1.05	1.03	0.90	1.03
Yemen	1.05	1.04	1.03	0.78	1.02
Zambia	1.03	1.02	1.00	0.82	1.00
Zimbabwe	1.03	1.02	0.92	0.68	0.95

== See also ==
- List of Chinese administrative divisions by sex ratio
- List of states and union territories of India by sex ratio
- Operational sex ratio
- Missing women
