= Erica Field =

American economist

Erica M. Field
- Born: February 12, 1974 (age 52)
- Education: Vassar College, Princeton University
- Awards: Elaine Bennett Research Prize, 2010
- Scientific career
- Fields: Economics
- Workplaces: Hoover Institution, Institute for Advanced Study, Harvard University, Duke University
- Doctoral advisors: Henry Farber; Anne Case
- Website: https://sites.duke.edu/ericafield/

Erica Marie Field (born February 12, 1974) is an economist who currently works as a James B. Duke Distinguished Professor of economics at Duke University. Her research interests include development economics, labour economics, and health economics. In 2010, her research was awarded the Elaine Bennett Research Prize.

== Biography ==
Erica Field earned an AB in Economics and Latin American Studies from Vassar College in 1996. As a Fulbright scholar, she then studied the impact of government programs in Peru on that country's labor force, before returning to school at Princeton University, where she completed her PhD in 2003 with a thesis on the impact of land-title reform on labor supply in Peru. After her graduation and a term as post-doctoral fellow as RWJ Scholar in Health Policy at Harvard University, she remained as assistant professor of economics (2005–09), being later promoted to John L. Loeb Associate Professor of Social Sciences (2010–11). In 2011, Field moved to Duke University as associate professor of Economics and Global Health before becoming a full professor in 2015. In parallel, she has held visiting appointments at the Center for Health and Wellbeing and at the Institute for Advanced Study. She also maintains affiliations as a fellow with the National Bureau of Economic Research (NBER) and the Bureau for Research in Economic Analysis of Development (BREAD) as well as with the Abdul Latif Jameel Poverty Action Lab (J-PAL). Moreover, she performs editorial duties for the academic journals Economic Development and Cultural Change, Review of Economics and Statistics, and Journal of Development Economics. Finally, she has worked as a consultant for USAID, World Bank, Asian Development Bank, and the Millennium Challenge Corporation, among others.

== Research ==
Erica Field's research focuses on development economics, labour economics, economic demography, and health. Her research has been acknowledged through several awards, including the Albert Rees Prize for Outstanding PhD Dissertation in Labor Economics, an Alfred P. Sloan Fellowship and the Elaine Bennett Research Prize.

A substantial body of Field's research concerns the effects of property rights. In Peru, she finds the issuance of property titles to urban squatters to increase the rate of housing renovation by over two-thirds, with most of the investment being financed through savings. Similarly, she finds stronger property rights in Peru to also induce strong increases in working hours, shifts from home-based work to external work, and substitution of child labour by adult labour. Moreover, in work with Maximo Torero, she finds that private sector banks fail to increase their rate of loan approval for individuals with property titles, even though they are on average offered lower interest rates; by contrast, possessing a property title raises approval rates for public sector loans by up to 12%, especially if the title is requested.

Another important of Field's research, within which she frequently collaborates with Rohini Pande, revolves around microfinance and entrepreneurship in India. Investigating the relationship between repayment frequency and default on microfinance loans, they find that the repayment schedule, e.g. how often repayments are made, doesn't affect borrowers' default or delinquency, suggesting that more flexible repayment schedules may lower transaction costs without increasing default. In work with Seema Jayachandran, they also find evidence that patriarchic gender norms in India constrain female entrepreneurship, with Muslim women (the sociocultural group with the most restrictions) being unable to benefit from business training. Moreover, together with Benjamin Feigenberg, Field and Pande observe strong economic returns to social interaction, as the frequency of meetings between repayment group members – but not the frequency of repayments – increases their willingness to pool risks and reduces their default rates. Finally, along with John Papp and Natalia Rigol, Field and Pande find that delaying the beginning of the repayment schedule for microloans raises short-run business investment and long-run profits but also raises default rates, suggesting that credits with early repayment discourage investment into illiquid yet high-return business opportunities and may thus stifle microenterprise growth.

Other topics of Field's research include the impacts of early marriage and iodine deficiency on schooling attainment, the relationship between educational debt burden and career choice as well as between household bargaining and excess fertility, and the effects of providing health insurance to the informal sector. In work with Attila Ambrus, she finds that each additional year by which marriage is delayed among Bangladeshi women is associated with 0.22 additional years of schooling, a 5.6% higher likelihood to be literate, and that delayed marriage is generally associated with a higher use of preventive health services. Together with Omar Robles and Maximo Torero, Field estimates that giving pregnant women strong iodine supplements increases the schooling by 0.35–0.56 years relative to their siblings and older and younger peers, with the effect being particularly large for girls. In an experiment at NYU Law School, Field finds that offering students a debt-free education doubles law school enrollment rates and substantially biases students towards public interest law. In Zambia, together with Nava Ashraf and Jean Lee, Field finds that women who are given concealable contraceptives in the presence of their husbands are 19% less likely to seek family planning services, 25% less likely to use the contraceptives, and 17% more likely to give birth.
