= Henry Farber =

American economist

Henry S. Farber
- Born: January 29, 1951 (age 75)

Academic background
- Education: Rensselaer Polytechnic Institute (B.Sc.); Cornell University (M.Sc.); Princeton University (Ph.D.)
- Doctoral advisor: Orley Ashenfelter

Academic work
- Discipline: Labor economics
- Institutions: Massachusetts Institute of Technology; Princeton University
- Doctoral students: William Dickens; Kevin Lang; Rebecca Blank; Lawrence F. Katz; Erica Field

Henry Stuart Farber (born January 29, 1951) is an American economist and the Hughes-Rogers Professor of Economics at Princeton University. His research revolves around different topics related to labor economics, econometrics, law and economics, and industrial relations.

== Education ==
Henry Farber obtained a B.Sc. in economics from Rensselaer Polytechnic Institute in 1972, a M.Sc. in industrial and labor relations from Cornell University in 1974, followed by a Ph.D. from Princeton University in 1977. Farber has stated that he became interested in labor economics because he was interested in studying the behavior of labor unions and the effects thereof.

== Academic career ==
After graduating from Princeton University in 1977, Henry Farber joined the Massachusetts Institute of Technology (MIT) as an assistant professor of economics, being promoted to associate professor in 1981 and gaining full professorship in 1986. Farber then left MIT in 1991 in order to return to Princeton University as a professor of economics before being endowed with the Hughes-Rogers professorship in 1995. At Princeton Farber, is also an associate of the Industrial Relations section, which he directed several times, as well as an associate of different other programs. Additionally, Farber has had affiliations with a number of institutions throughout his career, including the National Bureau of Economic Research, the Russell Sage Foundation, the Center for Advanced Study in the Behavioral Sciences, and the Institute for the Study of Labor (IZA). Last, Farber has acted in different editorial functions at research publications in economics such as the Economic Policy Review, Industrial and Labor Relations Review, American Economic Review, and Quarterly Journal of Economics.

== Research ==
Farber's research interests focus on unemployment, liquidity constraints and labor supply, labor unions, worker mobility, wage dynamics, and the analysis of the litigation process.

== Memberships ==
- American Economic Association
- American Law and Economics Association
- American Statistical Association
- Society of Labor Economists (Fellow)
- Econometric Society (Fellow)
