= List of Chinese provincial-level divisions by sex ratio =

The sex ratio of the different administrative divisions of China has been the subject of academic study because of a high imbalance in births since the 1990s and female infanticide further worsening the imbalanced sex ratios at birth.

== Gender ratio (males every 100 females) at birth ==
| Color | Regions of China |
|---|---|
| | North China |
| | East China |
| | Southwestern China |
| | Northwestern China |
| | South Central China |
| | Northeast China |

| Name | Region | 1990 | 2000 | 2010 | 2020 |
|---|---|---|---|---|---|
| Beijing | North China | 107.5 | 110.6 | 109.5 | 108.3 |
| Tianjin | North China | 110.1 | 112.5 | 113.7 | 108.7 |
| Hebei | North China | 112.5 | 113.4 | 114.9 | 108.8 |
| Shanxi | North China | 109.6 | 112.5 | 110.2 | 105.1 |
| Inner Mongolia | North China | 108.3 | 108.5 | 112.1 | 107.0 |
| Liaoning | Northeast China | 110.2 | 112.8 | 110.2 | 105.8 |
| Jilin | Northeast China | 108.7 | 111.2 | 111.2 | 107.4 |
| Heilongjiang | Northeast China | 107.3 | 109.7 | 112.4 | 106.2 |
| Shanghai | East China | 104.8 | 110.6 | 111.1 | 108.0 |
| Jiangsu | East China | 115.0 | 116.5 | 116.2 | 109.0 |
| Zhejiang | East China | 117.6 | 113.9 | 118.1 | 110.2 |
| Anhui | East China | 110.9 | 127.8 | 128.6 | 113.1 |
| Fujian | East China | 110.3 | 117.9 | 125.6 | 118.7 |
| Jiangxi | East China | 110.8 | 114.7 | 122.8 | 120.3 |
| Shandong | East China | 115.1 | 112.2 | 119.4 | 112.0 |
| Henan | South Central China | 116.2 | 118.5 | 117.8 | 108.4 |
| Hubei | South Central China | 109.6 | 128.2 | 124.1 | 114.3 |
| Hunan | South Central China | 110.2 | 126.2 | 123.2 | 114.2 |
| Guangdong | South Central China | 112.0 | 130.3 | 120.3 | 115.5 |
| Guangxi | South Central China | 116.9 | 125.5 | 122.7 | 114.5 |
| Hainan | South Central China | 114.9 | 135.6 | 125.3 | 122.4 |
| Chongqing | Southwestern China | 112.0 | 115.1 | 112.5 | 108.0 |
| Sichuan | Southwestern China | 112.0 | 116.0 | 111.6 | 108.2 |
| Guizhou | Southwestern China | 101.2 | 107.0 | 122.1 | 113.2 |
| Yunnan | Southwestern China | 107.4 | 108.7 | 111.8 | 107.5 |
| Tibet | Southwestern China | 103.2 | 102.7 | 106.6 | 105.4 |
| Shaanxi | Northwestern China | 111.3 | 122.1 | 115.3 | 108.3 |
| Gansu | Northwestern China | 110.8 | 114.8 | 117.4 | 107.5 |
| Qinghai | Northwestern China | 104.4 | 110.4 | 112.4 | 106.8 |
| Ningxia | Northwestern China | 107.0 | 108.8 | 113.9 | 105.7 |
| Xinjiang | Northwestern China | 104.7 | 106.1 | 106.1 | 107.5 |
| Mainland China | | 111.4 | 116.9 | 117.9 | 111.3 |
| Hong Kong | | 105.9 | 109.3 | 115.0 | 109.2 |
| Macau | | 110.4 | 111.7 | 108.1 | 107.0 |

== Gender ratio at ages 1-4 ==
The figures are from the 2000 census, intercensus survey of 2005 (which was carried out in November 2005 on a representative 1% of the total population), 2010 census, and 2020 census.

Figures for Hong Kong are from the 2001 census, 2011 census, and the 2021 census conducted separately by Census and Statistics Department of Hong Kong.

=== Mainland China ===
| Name | Region | 2000 | 2005 | 2010 | 2020 |
|---|---|---|---|---|---|
| Jiangxi | East China | 136.7 | 143 | 131.7 | 117.6 |
| Henan | South Central China | 136.4 | 142 | 126.6 | 108.7 |
| Anhui | East China | 129.9 | 138 | 126.3 | 112.6 |
| Hainan | South Central China | 135.7 | 134 | 125.0 | 118.6 |
| Hunan | South Central China | 123.8 | 133 | 120.6 | 113.1 |
| Guangdong | South Central China | 129.2 | 133 | 122.9 | 114.3 |
| Hubei | South Central China | 129.1 | 129 | 123.4 | 113.8 |
| Guizhou | Southwestern China | 115.4 | 127 | 124.3 | 113.4 |
| Shaanxi | Northwestern China | 126.6 | 125 | 117.1 | 108.1 |
| Jiangsu | East China | 124.2 | 123 | 121.4 | 109.6 |
| Hebei | North China | 116.2 | 122 | 116.9 | 109.0 |
| Guangxi | South Central China | 128.0 | 122 | 120.0 | 113.3 |
| Gansu | Northwestern China | 120.0 | 120 | 118.2 | 107.7 |
| Fujian | East China | 125.2 | 119 | 124.4 | 118.1 |
| Chongqing | Southwestern China | 117.0 | 119 | 112.6 | 108.0 |
| Tianjin | North China | 112.6 | 118 | 113.3 | 107.6 |
| Sichuan | Southwestern China | 115.1 | 116 | 110.9 | 107.7 |
| Shandong | East China | 114.9 | 116 | 123.3 | 112.5 |
| Yunnan | Southwestern China | 113.6 | 115 | 112.7 | 108.5 |
| Liaoning | Northeast China | 113.1 | 114 | 110.7 | 106.5 |
| Zhejiang | East China | 113.7 | 113 | 115.0 | 110.8 |
| Beijing | North China | 110.9 | 112 | 111.3 | 107.4 |
| Shanxi | North China | 110.4 | 112 | 110.5 | 105.2 |
| Jilin | Northeast China | 110.7 | 112 | 111.7 | 106.3 |
| Ningxia | Northwestern China | 109.0 | 112 | 112.8 | 107.2 |
| Heilongjiang | Northeast China | 108.6 | 111 | 110.6 | 106.8 |
| Qinghai | Northwestern China | 108.1 | 111 | 108.7 | 106.5 |
| Shanghai | East China | 110.2 | 109 | 114.6 | 108.4 |
| Inner Mongolia | North China | 109.7 | 107 | 110.2 | 107.2 |
| Xinjiang | Northwestern China | 105.6 | 106 | 105.5 | 106.3 |
| Tibet | Southwestern China | 101.1 | 104 | 104.8 | 104.4 |
| Mainland China | | 120.8 | 124 | 119.4 | 110.9 |

=== Hong Kong ===
| Name | 2001 | 2011 | 2021 |
|---|---|---|---|
| Hong Kong | 109.2 | 108.2 | 105.4 |

== See also ==
- Female infanticide in China
- Abortion in China
- Missing women of China
- List of countries by sex ratio
