= Missing women =

Fewer women than expected in a population

In the context of human demographics, the term "missing women" indicates a shortfall in the number of women relative to the expected number of women in a region or country. It is most often measured through male-to-female sex ratios, and is theorized to be caused by sex-selective abortions, female infanticide, and inadequate healthcare and nutrition for female children. It is argued that technologies that enable prenatal sex selection, which have been commercially available since the 1970s, are a large impetus for missing female children.

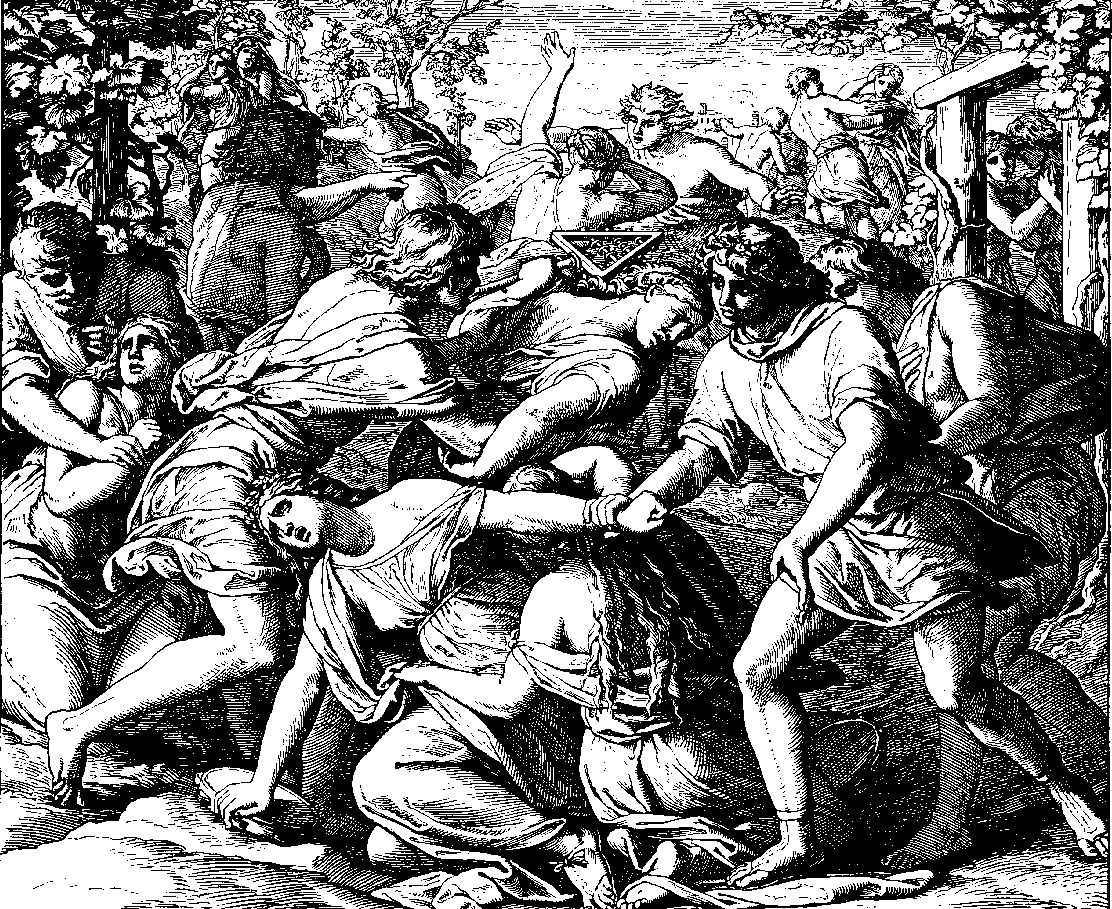
Benjaminites seize wives from Shiloh in this 1860 woodcut by Julius Schnorr von Karolsfeld. There were not enough women available for marriage due to the high losses in the Battle at Gibeah.

The phenomenon was first noted by the Indian Nobel Prize-winning economist Amartya Sen in an essay in The New York Review of Books in 1990, and expanded upon in his subsequent academic work. Sen originally estimated that more than a hundred million women were "missing" or "gone". Later researchers found differing numbers, with most recent estimates around 90–101 million women. These effects are concentrated in countries typically in Asia (with the largest numbers from India and Mainland China), the Middle East and northern Africa. Economists such as Nancy Qian and Seema Jayanchandran have found that a large part of the deficit in China and India is due to lower female wages and sex-selective abortion, or differential neglect. However, the disparity has also been found in Chinese and Indian immigrant communities in the United States, albeit to a far lesser degree than in Asia. Some countries in the former Soviet Union also saw declines in female births after the revolutions of 1989, particularly in the Caucasus region. Also the Western world saw a dramatic drop in female births since the 1980s.

Researchers have also argued that other diseases, HIV/AIDS, natural causes, and female abduction are also responsible for missing women. However, son preference, as well as associated reasons to care for male well-being over female well-being, is still considered to the primary cause.

In addition to the health and wellbeing of women, the missing women phenomenon has led to an excess of males in society and an imperfectly balanced marriage market. Because of the association of missing women with female neglect, countries with higher rates of missing women also tend to have higher rates of women in poor health, leading to higher rates of infants in poor health.

Researchers argue that increasing women's education and women's employment opportunities can help decrease the number of missing women, but the effects of these policy solutions differ greatly between countries due to differing levels of ingrained sexism between cultures. Various international measures have been instituted to combat the problem of missing women. For example, to bring awareness to the problem of missing women, the OECD measures the number of missing women through the "son preference" parameter in its SIGI index.

Map indicating the human sex ratio by country: Countries with more males than females Countries with the same number of males and females (accounting that the ratio has 3 significant figures, i.e., 1.00 males to 1.00 females) Countries with more females than males No data

== The problem and prevalence ==
According to Amartya Sen, even though women make up the majority of the world's population, the proportion of women in each country's population varies drastically from country to country, with various countries having fewer women than men. This runs contrary to research that females tend to have better survival rates than males, given the same amount of nutritional and medical attention. To capture this divergence from natural sex ratios, the count of "missing women" is measured as a comparison of a country's male-to-female (or female-to-male) sex ratio compared to the natural sex ratio. Unlike female mortality rates, estimates of missing women include counts of sex-specific abortions, which Sen cites as a large factor contributing to the disparity of sex ratios from country to country. Furthermore, female mortality rates fail to account for intergenerational effects from female discrimination, while a comparison of a country's sex ratio to natural sex ratios would.

Sen's original research found that while there are typically more women than men in European and North American countries (at around 0.98 men to 1 woman for most countries), the sex ratio of developing countries in Asia, as well as the Middle East, is much higher (in number of males for each female). For example, in Mainland China, the ratio of men to women is 1.06, far higher than most countries. The ratio is much higher for those born after 1985, when ultrasound technology became widely available. Using actual numbers, this means that in Mainland China alone, there are 50 million women "missing" – that should be there but are not. Adding up similar numbers from South and West Asia results in a number of "missing" women higher than 100 million.

According to Sen, "These numbers tell us, quietly, a terrible story of inequality and neglect leading to the excess mortality of women."

=== Estimates ===
Number of missing women in the world

Since Sen's original research, continued research in the field has led to varying estimates on the total numbers of missing women. Much of this variation is because of underlying assumptions for "normal" birth sex ratios and expected post-birth mortality rates for men and women.

Sen's original calculations using 1980s and 1990s data for missing women were indexed using the average sex ratio in Western Europe and North America as the natural sex ratio, through assuming that in these countries men and women received equal care. After further research, he updated these numbers with Sub-Saharan African sex ratios. Using these countries' sex ratios as the baseline and male-female populations from other countries as the data, he concluded that over 100 million women were missing, primarily in Asia. However, later authors pointed out that Europe tended to have higher rates of male mortality due to multiple wars and generally risky behavior. Due to male workers migrating from rural to urban regions, immigration, and world war, a culture of "high masculinity" existed in these countries, while on the other hand, in other countries such as India, traditions regarding the discriminatory treatment of female children were stronger from the late 1950s to mid-1980s.

As a result of this disparity between countries, American demographer Coale re-estimated the Sen's original numbers of missing women using a different methodology. Using data from his Regional Model Life Tables, Coale found that the natural male-to-female sex ratio, accounting for different country fertility rates and circumstances, had an expected value of 1.059. Using the number, he then arrived at an estimate of 60 million missing women, much lower than Sen's original estimate. However, a few years later, Klasen re-calculated the count of missing women using Coale's methodology with updated data. He found 69.3 million missing women, which was higher than Coale's original estimate. He also noted a problem with the Regional Model Life Tables; they were based on countries with higher female mortality, which would bias Coale's numbers of missing women downwards. Furthermore, Klasen and Wink noted that both Sen's and Coale's methodologies were flawed because Sen and Coale assume that optimal sex ratios are constant across time and space, which they are often not.

Klasen and Wink conducted a study in 2003 with updated census data. Using life expectancy to instrument for sex ratio at birth (which would account for non-constant sex ratios as well as biases from the Regional Model Life Tables), they estimated 101 million missing women across the world. Overall they found trends that showed that while West Asia, North Africa and most of South Asia saw more equal sex ratios, China's and South Korea's ratios worsened. In fact, Klasen and Wink noted that China was responsible for 80% of the rise in missing women from between 1994 and 2003. Sex-selective abortions were given as reasons for the lack of improvement in India and China, while women's growing educational and employment opportunities were cited as reasons for the ratio improvement in other previously low ratio countries such as Sri Lanka. Klasen and Wink also noted that similar to both Sen's and Coale's results, Pakistan had the world's highest percentage of missing girls relative to its total pre-adult female population.

Later estimates have tended to have higher numbers of missing women. For example, a 2005 study estimated that over 90 million females were "missing" from the expected population in Afghanistan, Bangladesh, China, India, Pakistan, South Korea and Taiwan alone. On the other hand, Guilmoto in his 2010 report uses recent data (except for Pakistan), and estimates a much lower number of missing girls in Asian and non-Asian countries, but notes that the higher sex ratios in numerous countries have created a gender gap – shortage of girls – in the 0–19 age group. A table summarizing his results is below:

Country	Gender gap 0-19 age group (2010)	% of the total female population
Afghanistan	265,000	3
Bangladesh	416,000	1.4
China	25,112,000	15
India	12,618,000	5.3
Nepal	125,000	1.8
Pakistan	206,000	0.5
South Korea	336,000	6.2
Singapore	21,000	3.5
Vietnam	139,000	1

=== Differences within countries/states ===
Even within countries, the prevalence of missing women can vary drastically. Das Gupta observed that the preference for boys and the resulting shortage of girls was more pronounced in the more highly developed Haryana and Punjab regions of India than in poorer areas. This prejudice was most prevalent among the more educated and affluent women and mothers in those two regions. In the Punjab region, girls did not receive inferior treatment if a girl was born as a first child in a given family, when the parents still had high hopes for obtaining a son later. However, subsequent births of girls were unwelcome, because each such birth diminished a chance of the family having a son. Because more affluent and educated women would have fewer offspring, they were therefore under more acute pressure to produce a son as early as possible. As ultrasound imaging and other techniques increasingly allowed early prediction of the child's sex, more affluent families opted for an abortion. Alternatively, if the girl was born, the family would decrease her chance of survival by not providing sufficient medical or nutritional care. As a result, in India there are more missing women in developed urban areas, than in rural regions.

On the other hand, in Mainland China, rural areas have a larger missing women problem than urban areas. Mainland China's regional differences lead to different attitudes towards the one-child policy. Urban areas have been found to be easier to enforce the policy, due to the danwei system, a generally more educated urban population – understanding that one child is easier to care for and keep healthy than two. In more rural areas where farming is labor-intensive and couples depend on male offspring to take care of them in old age, males children are preferred to females.

Even developed countries face problems with missing women. The bias against girls is very evident among the relatively highly developed, middle-class dominated nations (Taiwan, South Korea, Singapore, Armenia, Azerbaijan, Georgia) and the immigrant Asian communities in the United States and Britain. Only recently and in some countries (particularly South Korea) have the development and educational campaigns begun to turn the tide, resulting in more normal gender ratios.

=== Under-reporting ===
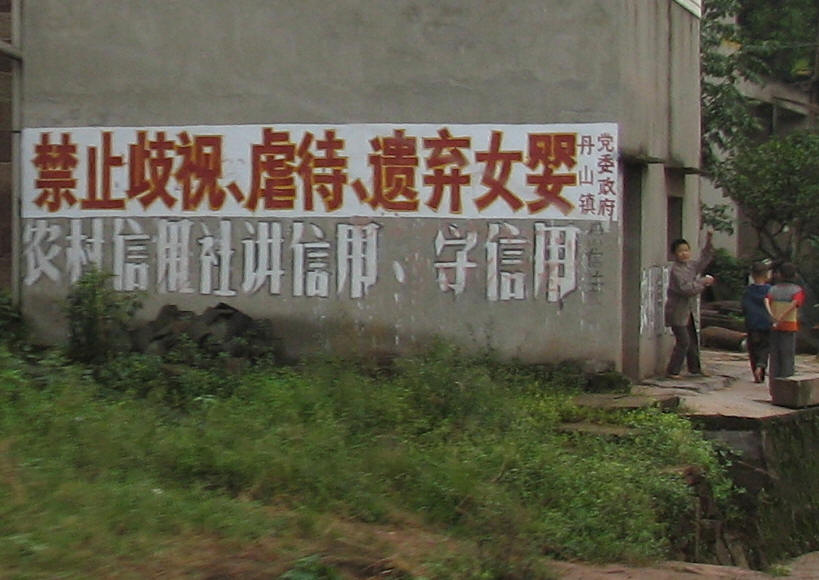
A roadside sign in rural Sichuan: "It is forbidden to discriminate against, abuse or abandon baby girls."

Some evidence suggests that in Asia, especially in Mainland China with its one-child policy, additional fertility behavior, infant deaths, and female birth information may be hidden or not reported. Instead of policy expanding women's opportunities for gainful employment policy, from 1979 onward the one-child policy has added upon the son preference causing the largest number of missing women in any country. As parents are eager to have sons and are allowed only one child, some first born females are not reported with the hope that their next child will be a son.

The numbers cited for the sex disparity in Mainland China is likely very exaggerated, as birth statistics is skewed by late registrations and unreported births of females: for instance, researchers found that census statistics of women in later stages of their life do not match with the birth statistics, possibly accounting for 25 million of the 30 million missing women commonly cited.

In the other direction, migration, especially to GCC countries, has become a larger issue for sex ratio estimates. Because many male migrants move across borders without their families, there is a large influx in the number of males, which would bias the sex ratios towards more missing women, even when there are not.

== Causes ==
=== Sen's original argument ===
Sen argued that the disparity in sex ratio across eastern Asian countries like India, China, and Korea when compared to North America and Europe, as seen in 1992, could only be explained by deliberate nutritional and health deprivations against women and female children. These deprivations are caused by cultural mechanisms, such as traditions and values, that vary across countries and even regionally within countries. Due to the inherent bias toward male children in many of these countries, female children, if born despite many instances of sex-selective abortion, are born without the same sense of priority given to men. This is especially true in the medical care given to men and women, as well as prioritizing who gets food in less privileged families, leading to lower survival rates than if both genders were treated equally.

==== Missing women: adults ====
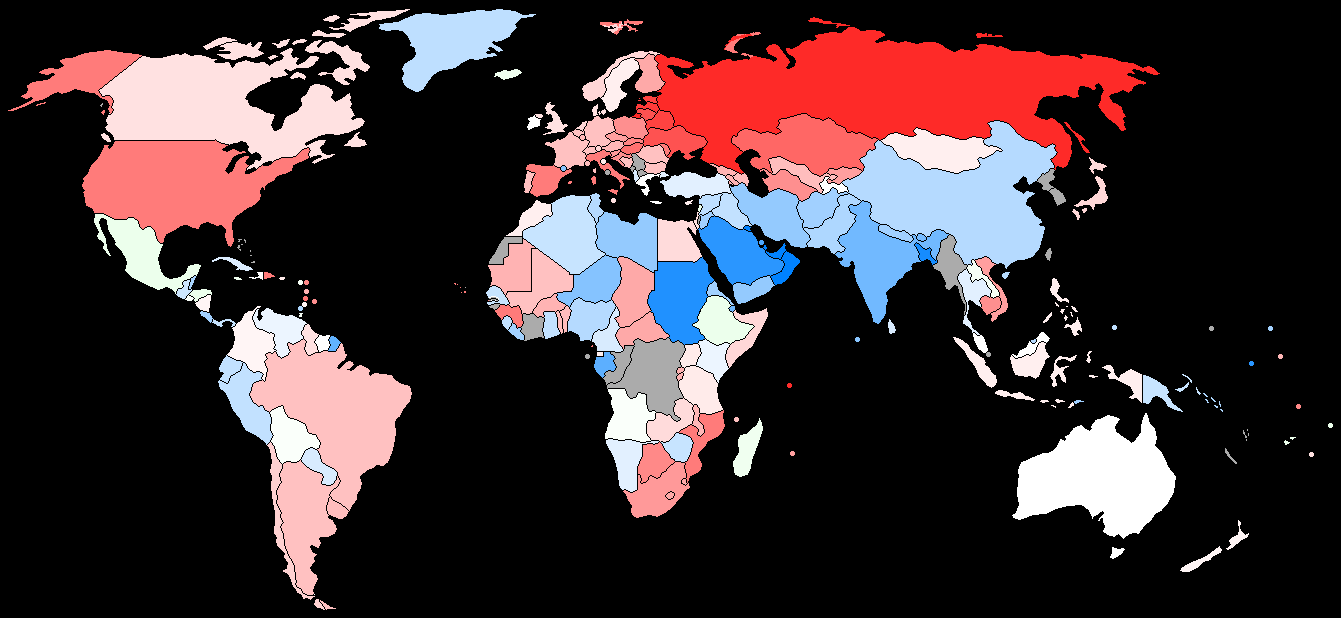
The sex ratio by country for the population aged above 65. Red represents more women, blue more men than the world average of 0.79 males/female.

According to Sen's cooperative conflict model, the relations within the household are characterized by both cooperation and conflict: cooperation in the addition of resources and conflict in the division of resources within the household. These intra-household processes are influenced by perceptions of one's self-interest, contribution and welfare. One's fall back position is the situation for each party once the bargaining process has failed and also determines the ability of each party to survive outside of the relationship.

Typically, the fall-back position for men who have land ownership rights, more economic opportunities and less care work related to children is better than a woman's fall-back position, who is dependent on her husband for land and income. According to this framework, when women lack a perception of personal interest and have greater concern for their family welfare gender inequalities are sustained. Sen argues that women's lower bargaining power in household decision-making contributes to the shortfall in female populations across eastern Asia.

Sen argues that the trend of lower female bargaining power may be positively correlated to the outside earning power and sense of contribution of women when compared to men. However, not all forms of outside work contribute equally to increasing women's bargaining power in the household; the type of outside work women do has bearing on their entitlements and fall-back position. Women can be doubly exploited in some cases: in Narsapur, India, lace-makers not only face lower bargaining power in the household, but often work for exploitatively low wages. Since lace-making is done in the home, it is perceived as only supplementary to male work rather than a gainful outside contribution. On the other hand, in Allahabad, India, women making cigarettes both gained an independent source of income and an increase in the community's view of their perceived contribution to the household.

==== Missing women: children ====
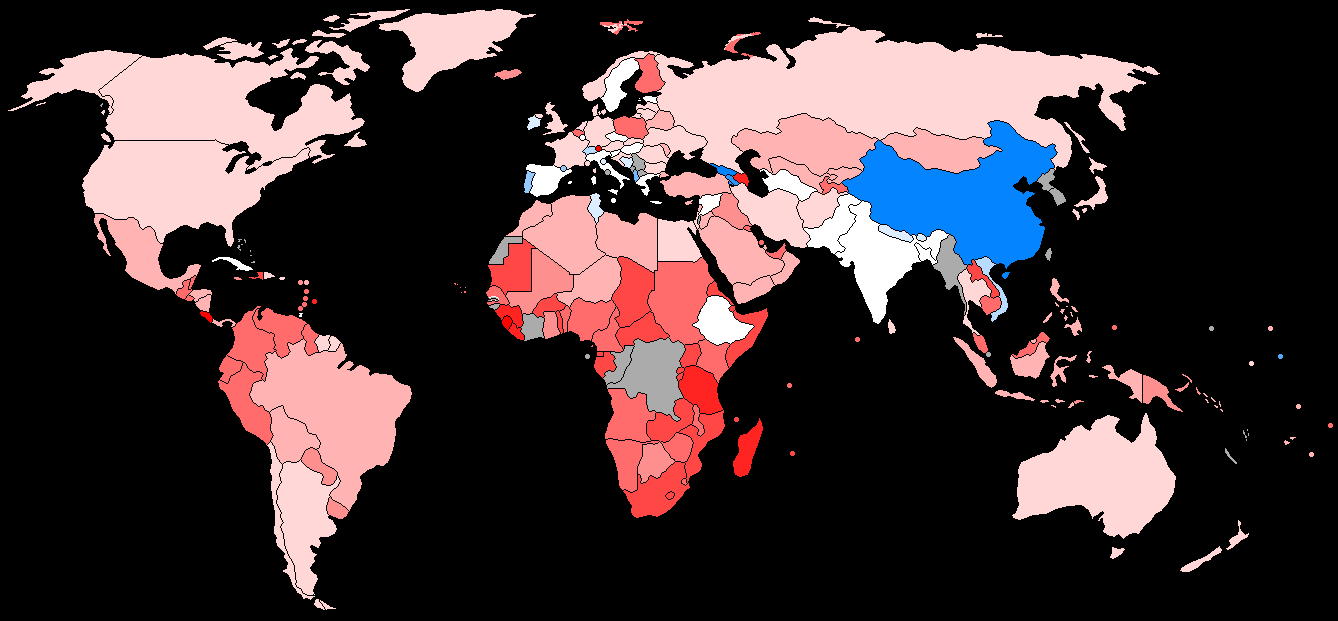
The sex ratio by country for the population aged below 15. Red represents more women, blue more men than the world average of 1.06 males/female.

Sen suggests that in areas with high proportions of missing women, the care and nutrition female children receive are tied to the community's view of their importance. Parents, even mothers, often avoid daughters because of the traditional patriarchal culture in the countries where the elimination of females takes place. Boys are more prized in these regions because they are looked upon as having an economically productive future, while women are not. As parents grow older they can expect much more help and support from their independent sons, than from daughters, who post-marriage functionally become the property of their husbands' families. Even if these daughters are educated and generate significant income, they have limited ability to interact with their natal families. Women are also often practically unable to inherit real estate, so a mother-widow will lose her family's (in reality her late husband's) plot of land and become indigent if she had had only daughters. Poor rural families have meager resources to distribute among their children, which reduces the opportunity to discriminate against girls.

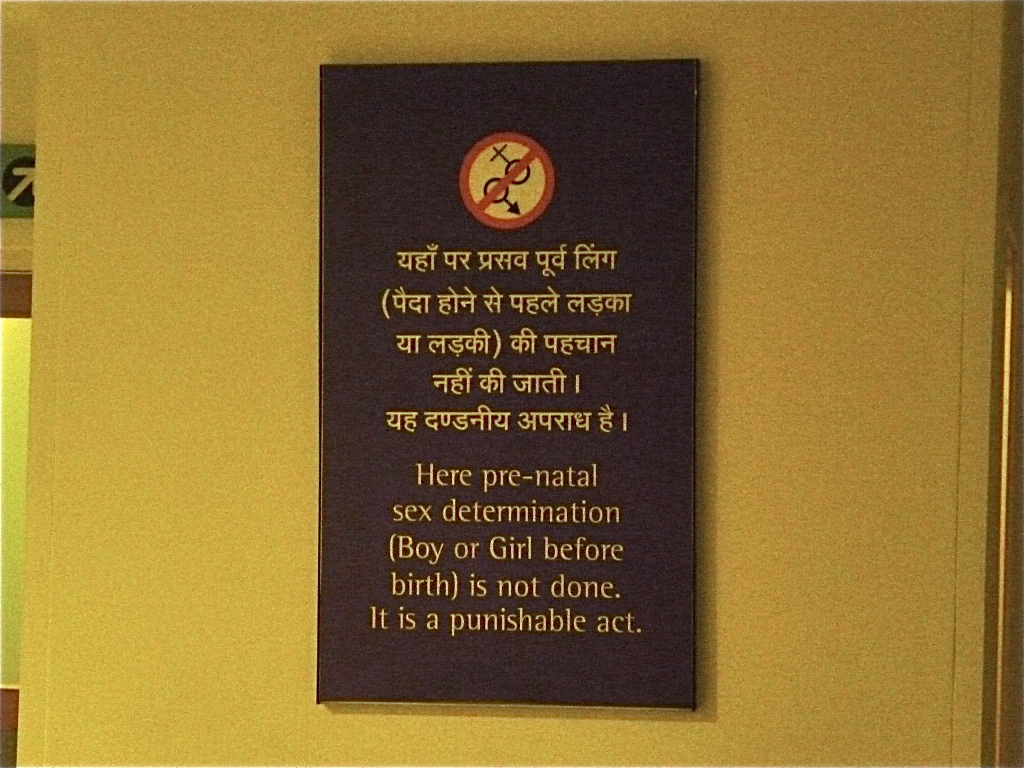
A sign in an Indian hospital stating that prenatal sex determination is a crime

Because of selective parental valuation of daughters, even as women are able to afford better healthcare and economic opportunities outside the home, the missing women problem still persists. Notably, ultrasound technology has exacerbated the problem of missing female children. Ultrasound treatment allows parents to screen out unwanted female fetuses before they are even born. Sen refers to this inequality as "high tech sexism." He concludes that these biases against women were so "entrenched" that even relative economic improvements in the lives of households have only enabled these parents a different avenue for rejecting their female children. Sen then argued that instead of just increasing women's economic rights and opportunities outside the home a greater emphasis needed to be placed on raising consciousness to eradicate the strong biases against female children.

==== The role of fertility ====
The natural sex ratio at birth is approximately 103 to 106 males for 100 females. However, because of sex-selective abortions, the sex ratio at birth in countries with high proportions of missing women have ranged 108.5 in India to 121.2 in Mainland China. As a result, counts of missing women are often due to missing female children. It is estimated that the cumulative number of missing female births due to sex-selective abortion globally is 45 million from 1970 to 2017.

Various researchers argue that declining fertility contributes to an intensified problem of missing women. This is because families have a preference for sons; a decrease in fertility would mean that families would no longer have children of multiple sexes, but rather a single male child. However, Klasen's research has found that other than in countries where policies severely restrict family planning (i.e. China due to the One Child Policy), fertility is not often associated with higher prevalence of missing women. This is because declining fertility is endogenous with other improvements of female well-being such as increasing female education, increasing female employment, and a decrease in gender bias. In fact, as Klasen notes, "In countries where fertility decline has been the largest, the share of missing women has fallen the most."

However, this varies between countries. Das Gupta finds that in South Korea, the male-to-female sex ratio spiked from 1.07 to 1.15 between the 1980s and 1990s because of the rising prevalence of ultrasound technology for the use of sex-selective abortions, but declined afterwards between 1990 and 2000 because of increasing modernization, education, and economic opportunities. Furthermore, in a study contrasting India and Bangladesh, researchers found that India's declining fertility caused a large intensification in son preference and thus an increase in the number of missing women, while declining fertility in Bangladesh led to less missing women.

=== Differential treatment and female bargaining power explanation ===
Economist Nancy Qian shows that, in mainland China, the female deficit declines when women earn more, and argues that mothers' preferences for daughters and lower female bargaining power caused by lower wages can explain much of missing women in mainland China. Another well-known paper by economists Seema Jayachandran and Illyana Kuziemko that is published in the same journal, the Quarterly Journal of Economics, show that in India, mothers breastfeed sons longer than daughters, which contributes to missing women in India.

=== Hepatitis B virus explanation ===
In her PhD dissertation at Harvard, Emily Oster argued that Sen's hypothesis did not take account of the different rates of prevalence of the Hepatitis B virus between Asia and other parts of the world. Regions with higher rates of Hepatitis B infection tend to have higher ratios of male to female births for biological reasons which are not yet well understood, but which have been extensively documented.

While the disease is fairly uncommon in US and Europe, it is endemic in mainland China and very common in other parts of Asia. Oster argued that this difference in disease prevalence could account for about 45% of the supposed "missing women", and even as high as 75% of the ones in mainland China. Furthermore, Oster showed that the introduction of a Hepatitis B vaccine had a lagged effect of equalizing the gender ratio towards what one would expect if other factors did not play a role.

==== Subsequent research ====
Oster's challenge was met with counter arguments of its own as researchers tried to sort out the available data and control for other possible confounding factors. Avraham Ebenstein questioned Oster's conclusion based on the fact that among first born children the sex ratio is close to the natural one. It is the skewed female-male ratios among second and third born children that account for the bulk of the disparity. In other words, if Hepatitis B was responsible for the skewed ratio then one would expect it to be true among all children, regardless of birth order.

However, the fact that the skewness arose less among the later born than among the first born children, suggested that factors other than the disease were involved.

Das Gupta pointed out that the female-male ratio changed in relation to average household income in a way that was consistent with Sen's hypothesis but not Oster's. In particular, lower household income eventually leads to a higher boy/girl ratio. Furthermore, Das Gupta documented that the gender birth order was significantly different conditional on the sex of the first child.

If the first child was male, then the sex of the subsequent children tended to follow the regular, biologically determined sex pattern (boys born with probability 0.512, girls born with probability 0.488). However, if the first child was female, the subsequent children had a much higher probability of being male, indicating that conscious parental choice was involved in determining the sex of the child. Neither of these phenomena can be explained by the prevalence of hepatitis B.

They are, however, consistent with Sen's contention that it is purposeful human action – in the form of selective abortion and perhaps even infanticide and female infant neglect – that is the cause of the skewed gender ratio.

==== Oster's theory refuted ====
Part of the difficulty in discerning between the two competing hypotheses was the fact that while the link between Hepatitis B and a higher likelihood of male birth had been documented, there was little information available on the strength of this link and how it varied by which of the parents were the carriers. Furthermore, most prior medical studies did not use a sufficiently high number of observations to convincingly estimate the magnitude of the relationship.

However, in a 2008 study published in the American Economic Review, Lin and Luoh utilized data on almost 3 million births in Taiwan over a long period of time and found that the effect of maternal Hepatitis B infection on the probability of male birth was very small, about one quarter of one percent. This meant that the rates of Hepatitis B infection among mothers could not account for the vast majority of missing women.

The remaining possibility was that it was the infection among fathers that could lead to a skewed birth ratio. However, Oster, together with Chen, Yu and Lin, in a follow-up study to Lin and Luoh examined a data set of 67,000 births (15% of whom were Hepatitis B carriers) and found no effect of infection on birth ratio for either the mothers or fathers. As a result, Oster retracted her earlier hypothesis.

=== Other diseases ===
In a 2008 study, Anderson and Ray claim that other diseases may explain the "excess female mortality" across Asia and sub-Saharan Africa. By comparing relative death rates of females to males in developed countries to the country in question, Anderson and Ray find that 37 to 45% of the missing women in mainland China can be traced to pre-birth and infancy stage termination factors, whereas only around 11% of India's missing women were caused by similar factors, pointing to the fact that the loss is spread across different ages. They find that by and large, the main cause for female deaths in India is cardiovascular disease. "Injuries" is the number two cause of female deaths in India. Both of these causes are far greater than maternal mortality and abortion of fetuses, though "Injuries" may be directly related to gender discrimination.

Their findings for mainland China also attribute missing women of older ages to cardiovascular and other non-communicable diseases, accounting for a large portion of excess female deaths. However, the largest bracket of missing women is in the 0-4 age group, suggesting discrimination factors at work in accordance to Sen's original theories.

In sub-Saharan Africa, in contrast to Sen's contention and average statistics, Anderson and Ray find a large number of women are missing. Sen used the sex ratio of 1.022 for sub-Saharan Africa in work done in 2001, to avoid comparing advanced countries to developing ones. Just as Sen believed, in their study they find no evidence to impute the missing women to birth discrimination such as sex-selective abortions or neglect. To account for the high number of young women missing they discovered that HIV/AIDS was the main cause, surpassing malaria and maternal mortality. Anderson and Ray estimated an annual excess female death rate 600,000 due to HIV/AIDS alone. The age groups with the highest numbers of missing women were the 20- to 24- and 25- to 29-year-old ranges. The high prevalence of HIV/AIDS seems to suggest, according to Anderson and Ray, an imbalance in women's access to healthcare as well as different attitudes about sexual and cultural norms.

In an article in 2008, Eileen Stillwaggon, showed that higher rates of HIV/AIDS are the consequence of deep-rooted gender inequalities in sub-Saharan Africa. In countries where women cannot own property they are in a more precarious fall-back position, having less bargaining power to "insist on safe sex without risking abandonment" by their husbands. She claims that a person's vulnerability to HIV depends on their overall health, and as misinformed practices, such as the belief that having sex with a female virgin will cure a male of AIDS, dry sex, and household activities that expose women to diseases contribute to weakening women's immune systems which leads to higher HIV mortality rates. Stillwaggon argues for increased focus on sanitation and nutrition rather than just abstinence or safe sex. As women become healthier the chances of an infected female transmitting HIV to a male partner decline significantly.

=== Natural causes to high or low human sex ratio ===
Other scholars question the assumed normal sex ratio, and point to a wealth of historical and geographical data that suggest sex ratios vary naturally over time and place, for reasons not properly understood. William James and others suggest that conventional assumptions have been:

- there are equal numbers of X and Y chromosomes in mammalian sperms
- X and Y stand equal chance of achieving conception
- therefore equal number of male and female zygotes are formed, and that
- therefore any variation of sex ratio at birth is due to sex selection between conception and birth.

James cautions that available scientific evidence stands against the above assumptions and conclusions. He reports that there is an excess of males at birth in almost all human populations, and the natural sex ratio at birth is usually between 102 and 108. However the ratio may deviate significantly from this range for natural reasons such as early marriage and fertility, teenage mothers, average maternal age at birth, paternal age, age gap between father and mother, late births, ethnicity, social and economic stress, warfare, environmental and hormonal effects. This school of scholars support their alternate hypothesis with historical data when modern sex-selection technologies were unavailable, as well as birth sex ratio in sub-regions, and various ethnic groups of developed economies. They suggest that direct abortion data should be collected and studied, instead of drawing conclusions indirectly from sex ratio as Sen and others have done.

James's hypothesis is supported by historical birth sex ratio data before technologies for ultrasonographic sex-screening were discovered and commercialized in the 1960s and 1970s, as well by reversed sex ratios currently observed in Africa. Michel Garenne reports that many African nations have, over decades, witnessed birth sex ratios below 100, that is more girls are born than boys. Angola, Botswana and Namibia have reported birth sex ratios between 94 and 99, which is quite different than the presumed 104 to 106 as natural human birth sex ratio. John Graunt noted that in London over a 35-year period in the 17th century (1628–1662), the birth sex ratio was 1.07; while Korea's historical records suggest a birth sex ratio of 1.13, based on 5 million births, in 1920s over a 10-year period.

=== Female abduction and sale ===
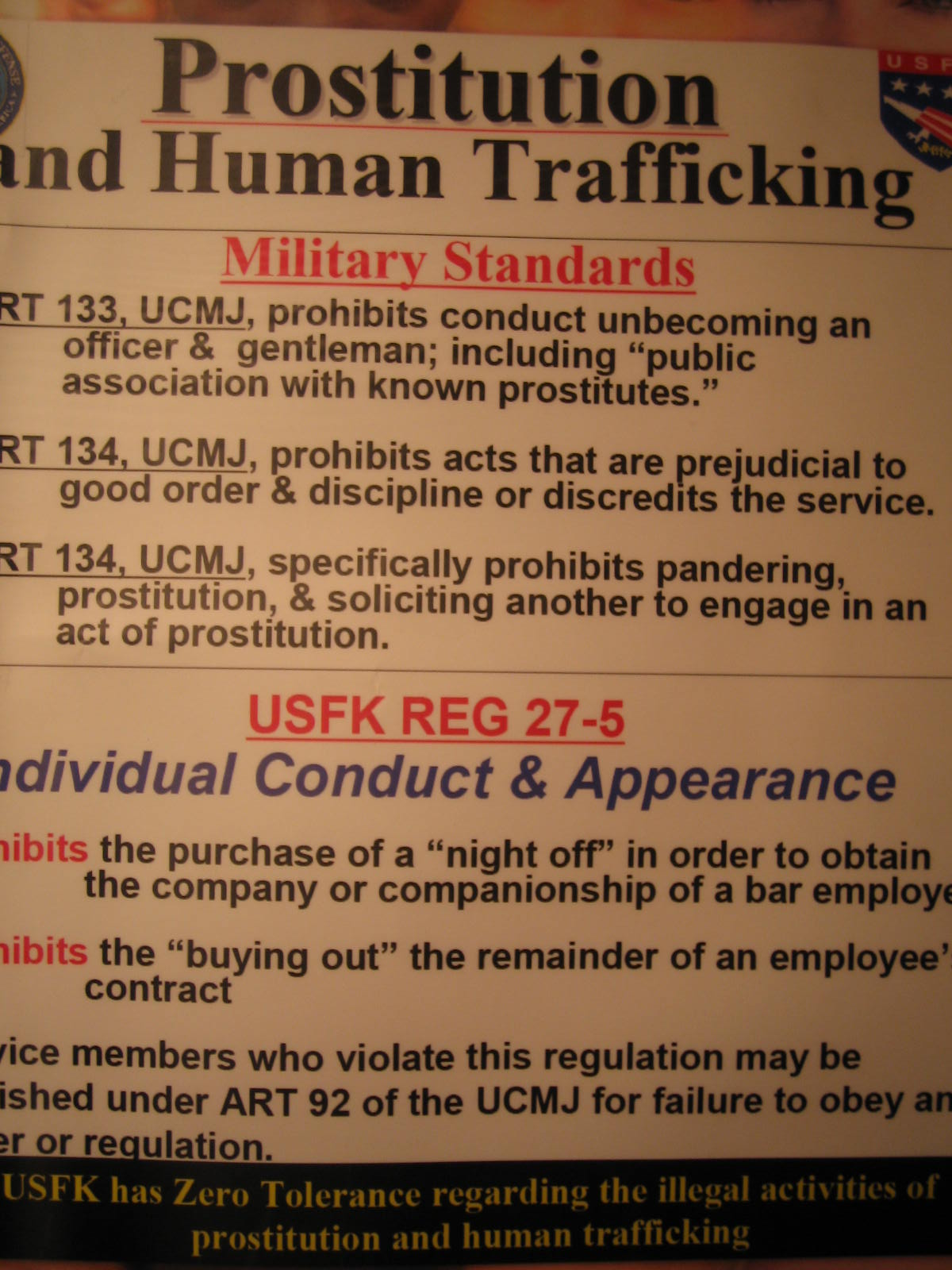
Warning of Prostitution and human trafficking in South Korea for G.I. by United States Forces Korea

Evidence has shown that number of missing women may be due to other reasons than sex selective abortions or female migrant work. Specifically, female babies, girls and women have been preyed upon by human traffickers. Kidnapping and enslavement of women by the ISIS, especially of Yazidi women and other female prisoners also constitute human trafficking.

In mainland China families are less willing to sell male babies even though they carry a higher price in the trade. Females born exceeding the one-child policy can be sold to wealthier families while the parents claim selling their female baby is better than other alternatives.

Overseas adoption services for Chinese children have been involved in baby trafficking to reap the profits of donations from foreign adopters. One study notes that between 2002 and 2005 approximately 1000 trafficked babies were placed with adopting parents, each baby costing $3000. To keep up supply of orphans for adoption, orphanages and retirement homes hire women as baby traffickers.

=== Under-reporting ===
As discussed above, an additional cause of the missing women phenomenon is under-reporting—women or girls who actually are in the population, but are not included in population statistics because their parents didn't report their birth or delayed reporting it.

== Consequences ==
Some research has also noted that in the mid-1990s, the observed trends reversed in regions of Asia where male/female ratios were high. In line with the studies of Das Gupta described above, as income increases the bias in the sex ratio towards boys decreases.

=== Societal health ===
Female discrimination and neglect does not just affect girls and women. Sen described the effects of female malnutrition and other forms of discrimination on men's health. As pregnant women suffer from nutritional neglect the fetus suffers, leading to low birth weight for male as well as female babies. Medical studies have found a close relationship to low birth weight and cardiovascular diseases at later stages in life. While underweight female babies are at risk for continuing undernourishment, ironically, Sen points out that even decades after birth, "men suffer disproportionately more from cardiovascular diseases."

With high per capita income growth in many parts of India and mainland China during the late 1990s and the 2000s, male/female ratios have begun shifting towards "normal" levels. However, for India and mainland China, this appears to be due to a fall in adult female mortality rates, relative to male adults, rather than a change in the sex ratio among children and newborns.

In general, these conditions amount to widespread deprivations of women across East and South Asia. According to Nussbaum's Capabilities Approach, as millions of females are discriminated against they are being deprived of their essential capabilities to such as life, bodily health and bodily integrity, among others. According this framework, policy should focus on increasing women's capabilities even at the cost of changing long held traditions.

=== Missing brides ===
Some have speculated that the disparity in the sex ratio may affect the marriage market in such a way that may turn the tide of missing women. David De La Croix and Hippolyte d'Albis developed the Missing Bride Index and a mathematical model showing that over time, as rich and affluent families continue to abort female babies and raise male children and as less wealthy families have girls, more males will be more affluent and the prospects for women to marry will increase. They predict that prospects for girls in the marriage market may become so auspicious that bearing female children may be seen as a positive rather than a negative.

=== Excess men ===
Since the advent of sex-selective abortions via ultrasound and other medical procedures in the 1980s, the gender discriminations that have caused the “missing women” have simultaneously produced cohorts of excess men. Many speculated that this group of excess men would cause social disturbances such as crime and abnormal sexual behaviors without the opportunity to marry. In a 2011 study, Hesketh found crime rates to not differ significantly from areas with known higher populations of excess men. She found that instead of being prone to aggression these men are more likely to feel outcast and suffer from feelings of failure, loneliness and associated psychological problems. Others are using emigration to other countries like the U.S or Russia as a solution.

To combat runaway sex-ratio disparity, Hesketh recommends government policy to intervene by making sex selective abortion illegal and promoting awareness to fight son preference paradigms.

=== Other effects ===
A different development occurred in South Korea which in the early 1990s had one of the highest male to female ratios in the world. By 2007 however, South Korea, had a male to female ratio comparable to that found in Western Europe, the US and sub-Saharan Africa.

This development characterized both adult ratios as well as the ratios among new births. According to Chung and Das Gupta rapid economic growth and development in South Korea has led to a sweeping change in social attitudes and reduced the preference for sons. Das Gupta, Chung, and Shuzhuo conclude that it is possible that China and India will experience a similar reversal in trend towards normal sex ratio in the near future if their rapid economic development, combined with policies that seek to promote gender equality, continue. This reversal has been interpreted as the latest phase of a more complex cycle called the "sex ratio transition".

== Policy solutions ==
Policy solutions are complicated by the fact that patterns of "missing women" are not uniform in all parts of developing nations. Studies find large variations between missing women. For example, there is an "excess" of women in Sub-Saharan Africa rather than deficit: the ratio of women to men is 1.02. On the other hand, there are disproportionately large numbers of missing women in India and mainland China. Researchers argue that the prevalence of "missing women" is often intertwined with a society's culture and history, and as a result, it is difficult to create broad policy solutions. For example, Jafri argues that the relegation of women to an inferior position in Muslim society perpetuates the "missing women" issue. On the other hand, there is evidence suggesting that even in the sixteenth through nineteenth centuries, Western European countries did not face sex ratios as skewed as the ones we see today in various developing countries. Even between India and Bangladesh, two countries with similar levels of education and gender disparity today, there are differences in missing women: the same measures to improve female welfare in Bangladesh do much worse in India. Kabeer argues that this is the case because India is stratified by social caste, while Bangladesh is more homogenous; as a result, progressive ideas such as improving the welfare of women can more easily disseminate in Bangladesh.

Regardless of cultural variation, Sen argues that in general, policies aimed to address education and women's employment opportunities outside the home may improve the missing women situation and fight the stigma attached to female children. Much research has been conducted in this area.

=== Education ===
Findings from the Indian Census in 2001 suggest that women's increased educational attainment was associated with the rise in the female-to-male sex ratio of India. Similarly, Dito's research in Ethiopia shows that in families where females are highly educated, have many brothers, and are close in age to their husbands, women tend to be more well-off, leading to lower counts of missing women. Thus, in some countries, increasing access to education has helped

On the other hand, later studies of India showed that increasing education may actually worsen the missing women phenomenon. Increasing female education may actually increase the rate of sex-selective abortion and thus increase the male-to-female sex ratio, as more well-educated female adults realize that opportunities in their society for their male children are much better than opportunities for their female children. In addition, female children are seen as a cost on the family because of their lack of employment opportunities, the paying of dowry, and their limited ability to own property. Mukherjee argues that this is further exacerbated by the fact that despite higher female education in India, there is a scarcity of jobs for highly educated women, suggesting that even with higher education, women's place in society does not expand much.

=== Employment opportunities ===
Sen argues that a woman's opportunity to participate in the labor force affords her more bargaining power within the home. In Sub-Saharan Africa, where there are fewer missing women, a woman is generally able to earn income from outside the home, increasing her contributions to her household and contributing to a different overall view of the value of women compared to that of Southeast and East Asia. However, Sen's contention about gainful work outside the home has led to some debates. Berik and Bilginsoy researched Sen's premise that improved women's economic opportunities outside of the home will diminish the disparity in the sex ratio in Turkey. They found that as women participated more in the work force and maintained their unpaid labor the sex ratio disparity grew, contrary to Sen's original prediction. On the other hand, Sen notes that in Narsapur, India, lace-makers have less bargaining power from their labor because lace-making is done in the home and perceived as supplementary, rather than gainful, labor. However, women making cigarettes in Allahabad, India, were viewed as having gainful labor, which helped boost the community's view of women. As Sen argues, only gainful labor is useful for dismantling the phenomenon of missing women.

Qian adds to these analyses by noting that a rise in female income is not enough to solve the missing women problem; rather, the rise in female income must be relative to male income. In her 2008 study, Qian shows that when females in mainland China earn a 10% increase in household income while male income is held constant, male births fall by 1.2 percentage points. This female-specific wage boost also increases parents' investment in female children, with female children gaining 0.25 years more education. As a result, an increase in female-specific economic productivity helped boost both the survival of and investment in female children. Thus, if women become more economically productive themselves, it may alter the view of female children as economically unproductive as well. This may increase girls' chances of surviving to birth and receiving the care and attention during childhood that they need.

=== International organizations and currently implemented policies ===
Despite the variations in studies on which policies help decrease the number of missing women, several international organizations and independent countries have taken measures to attempt to help the problem. The OECD includes "missing women" as a measure under the Son preference parameter of its Social Inclusion and Gender Index, bringing awareness to it as an issue. Furthermore, the 1989 Convention on the Rights of the Child noted the importance of children in measuring a society's level of equality, while the Fourth UN Conference for Women in 1995 developed the Beijing platform, which recognized the rights of the female child. In addition, due to international pressure, India and mainland China have both banned the use of ultrasounds for the purpose of sex-selective abortions. However, economists have found that banning sex-selective abortion where parents have strong boy bias can lead to increased female infant mortality.

In 2014, Kabeer, Huq, and Mahmud used a comparison of India and Bangladesh to argue that cultural dissemination of progressive ideas boosting the place of women in society is key for solving the problem of missing women. They show that NGOs in Bangladesh, which are present in over seventy percent of Bangladeshi villages, can be a helpful tool to mobilize change and culture. On the other hand, they argue that culturally instituted inequities such as India's caste system, which stratifies its society, prevent the spread of more progressive ideas, and as a result, cause a higher prevalence of missing women.

== See also ==
- Demographics of Asia
- Missing women of China
- Female foeticide in India
- Sexism in India
