= Trivers–Willard hypothesis =

Theory in evolutionary biology proposed to explain sex ratio deviations in mammals

In evolutionary biology and evolutionary psychology, the Trivers–Willard hypothesis, formally proposed by Robert Trivers and Dan Willard in 1973, suggests that female mammals adjust the sex ratio of offspring in response to maternal condition, so as to maximize their reproductive success (fitness). For example, it may predict greater parental investment in males by parents in "good conditions" and greater investment in females by parents in "poor conditions" (relative to parents in good conditions). The reasoning for this prediction is as follows: Assume that parents have information on the sex of their offspring and can influence their survival differentially. While selection pressures exist to maintain a 1:1 sex ratio, evolution will favor local deviations from this if one sex has a likely greater reproductive payoff than is usual.

Trivers and Willard also identified a circumstance in which reproducing individuals might experience deviations from expected offspring reproductive value—namely, varying maternal condition. In polygynous species, males may mate with multiple females, and low-condition males will achieve fewer or no matings. Parents in relatively good condition would then be under selection for mutations causing production and investment in sons (rather than daughters), because of the increased chance of mating experienced by these good-condition sons. Mating with multiple females conveys a large reproductive benefit, whereas daughters could translate their condition into only smaller benefits. An opposite prediction holds for poor-condition parents—selection will favor production and investment in daughters, so long as daughters are likely to be mated, while sons in poor condition are likely to be out-competed by other males and end up with zero mates (i.e. those sons will be a reproductive dead end).

The hypothesis was used to explain why, for example, red deer mothers would produce more sons when they are in good condition, and more daughters when in poor condition. In polyandrous species where some females mate with multiple males (and others get no matings) and males mate with one/few females (i.e. "sex-role reversed" species), these predictions from the Trivers–Willard hypothesis are reversed: parents in good condition will invest in daughters in order to have a daughter that can out-compete other females to attract multiple males, whereas parents in poor condition will avoid investing in daughters who are likely to get out-competed, and will instead invest in sons in order to gain at least some grandchildren.

"Condition" can be assessed in multiple ways, including body size, parasite loads, or dominance, which has also been shown in macaques (Macaca sylvanus) to affect the sex of offspring, with dominant females giving birth to more sons and non-dominant females giving birth to more daughters. Consequently, high-ranking females give birth to a higher proportion of males than those who are low-ranking.

In their original paper, Trivers and Willard were unaware of a biochemical mechanism which could result in biased sex ratios. One possible explanation is that a high level of circulating glucose in the mother's bloodstream favors the survival of male blastocysts. This conclusion is based on the observed male-skewed survival rates (to expanded blastocyst stages) when bovine blastocysts were exposed to heightened levels of glucose. As blood glucose levels are highly correlated with access to high-quality food, they may serve as a proxy for maternal condition.

== Humans ==
The Trivers–Willard hypothesis has been applied to resource differences among individuals in a society as well as to resource differences among societies. Investigations in humans pose a number of practical and methodological difficulties, but while a 2007 review of previous research found that empirical evidence for the hypothesis was mixed, the author noted that it received greater support from better-designed studies. One such example cited was a 1997 analysis of Hungarian Romani – a low-status group with a preference for females, who "had a female-biased sex ratio at birth, were more likely to abort a child after having had one or more daughters, nursed their daughters longer, and sent their daughters to school for longer".

== See also ==
- r/K selection theory
- Returning soldier effect
