= Returning soldier effect =

Phenomenon in human reproduction

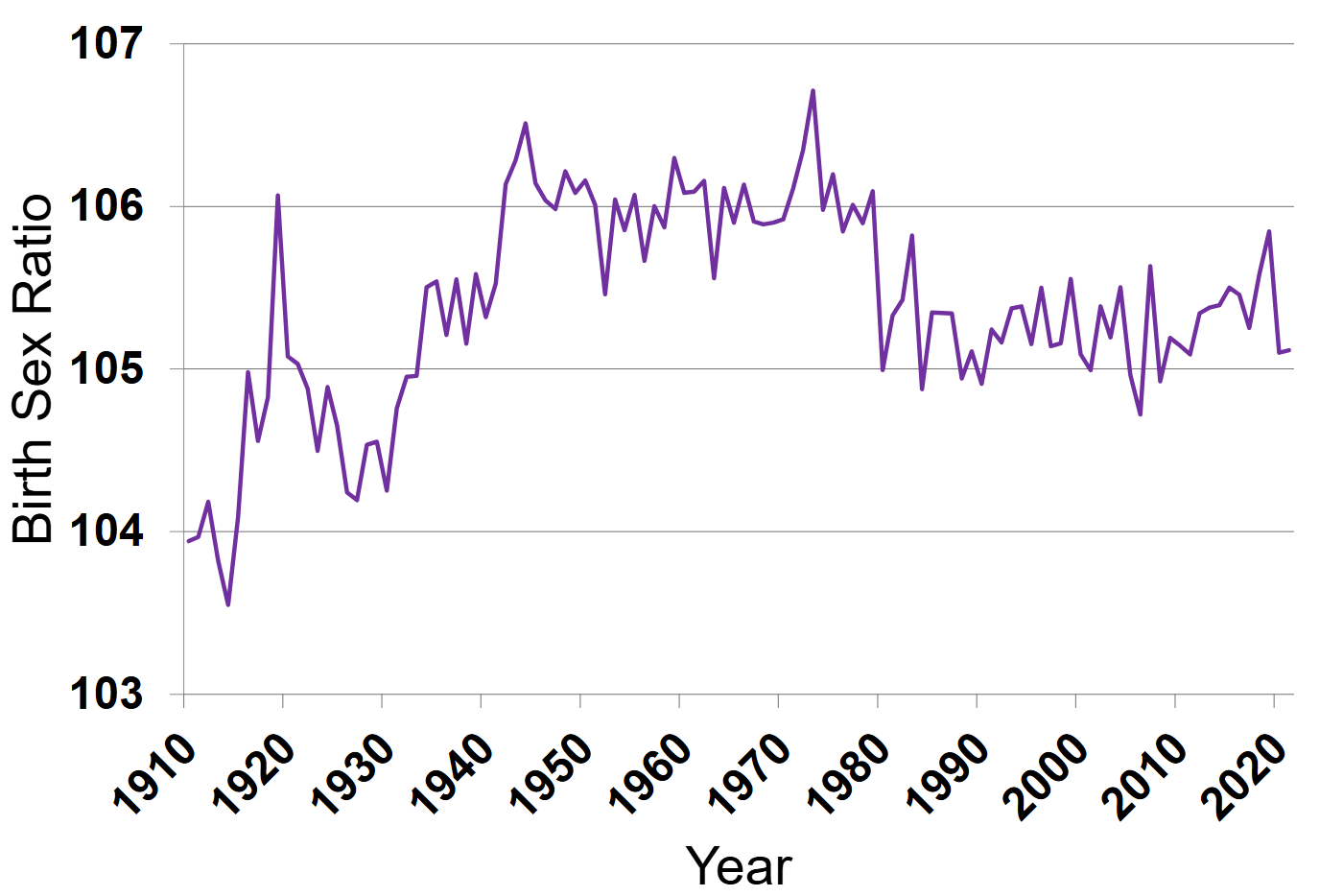
Live male births per 100 live female births, England and Wales, Scotland and Northern Ireland, 1910 to 2021. Given a large population, wars and economic crises can cause variations.

The returning soldier effect is an observed phenomenon where more boys are born relative to the number of girls after periods of war.

The effect is one of many factors influencing human sex ratio. It was especially noticeable worldwide during and following the World Wars. It was first identified before the invention of modern methods to discern the sex of the baby before birth.

== Sex ratio without war ==
The normal ratio is estimated to be some 1.03 to 1.06 males per female, which appears to compensate for the fact that child mortality rate among boys is slightly higher than among girls, and that adult men are more likely to die from an accident than women.

== Cases before Ultrasound ==
The phenomenon was first noticed in 1883 by Carl Düsing of the University of Jena, who suggested that it was a natural regulation of the status quo. Writing in 1899, an Australian physician, Arthur Davenport, used Düsing's findings to hypothesize that the cause was the difference between the comparative ill-health of the returning troops compared to the good health of their partners.

Research published in 1954 by Brian MacMahon and Thomas F. Pugh showed that the sex ratio of white live births in the United States had shown a marked increase in favor of boys between 1945 and 1947, after World War II, with a peak in 1946.

In 2007, Kanazawa Satoshi published a paper theorizing that the effect was due to "the fact that taller soldiers are more likely to survive battle and that taller parents are more likely to have sons". This was based on his research of British Army records from World War I, which showed that "surviving soldiers were on average more than one inch (3.33 cm) taller than fallen soldiers". Other genetic explanations have been proposed.

Valerie Grant attributed it to changing hormone levels of women during war, as they tended to "adopt more dominant roles".

William H. James writing in 2008 gave an increase in coital rates by returning soldiers as a possible cause.

== Cases after Ultrasound ==
With the advent of obstetric ultrasonography for prenatal sex discernment, which was first proved in an academic setting in 1962, and became commercially commonplace at around 1985 with FDA approval, it became possible for parents to know the sex of offspring before birth, introducing the cause of sex-selective abortions, significantly obscuring the original returning soldier effect.

William H James also noted that a fall in the ratio of male births had been recorded in Iran following the Iran–Iraq War, "explained by psychological stress causing pregnant women disproportionately to abort male fetuses".

== See also ==
- Killer ape theory
- Trivers–Willard hypothesis
