= Maximo Torero =

Peruvian economist

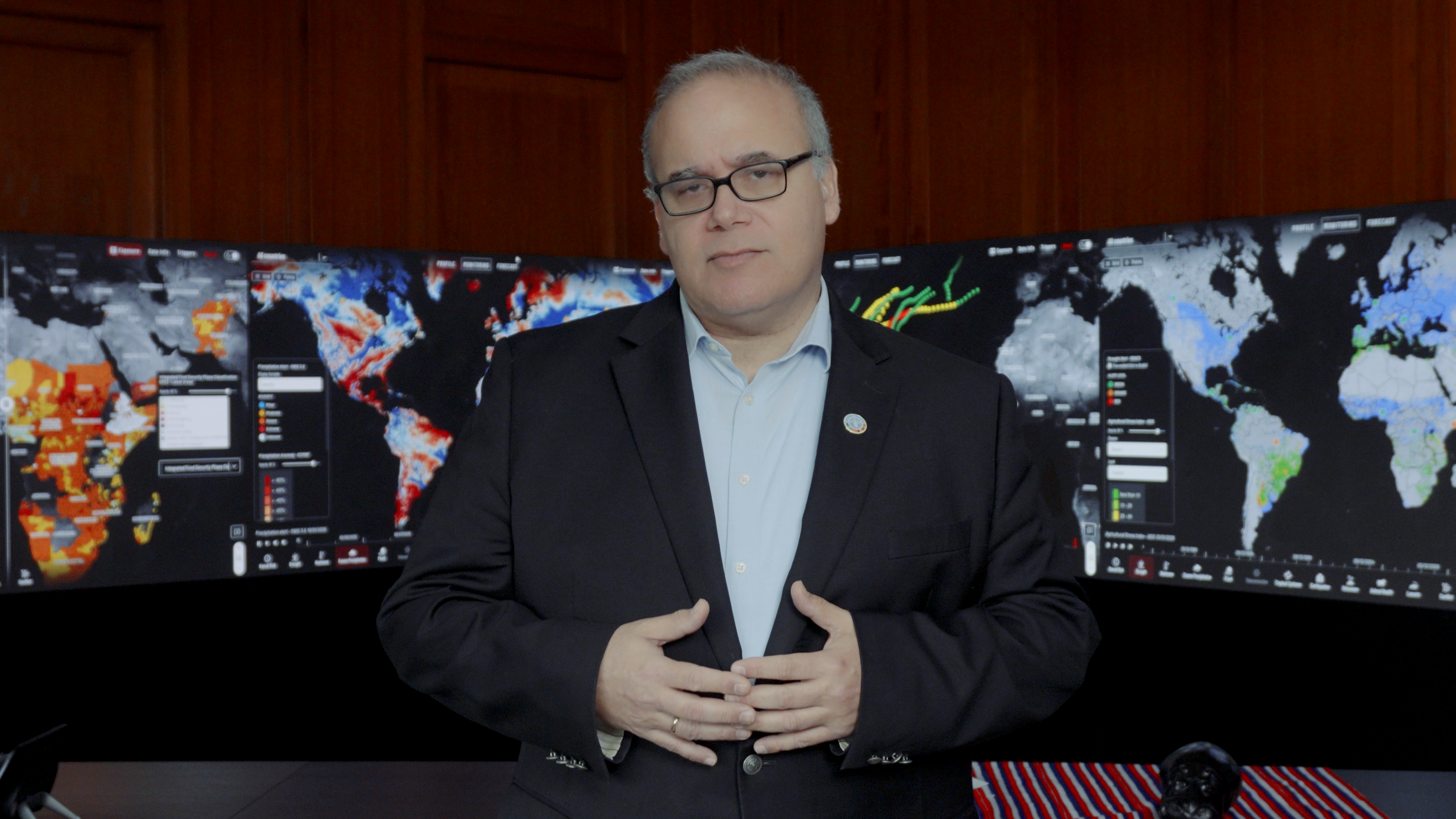

Chief Economist and Assistant Director General of the Economic and Social Development Department Food and Agriculture Organization (FAO)
- Incumbent
- Assumed office January 2019
- President: Qu Dongyu, Director General
- Preceded by: Kostas G. Stamoulis

Personal details
- Born: 27 May 1967 (age 59) Lima, Peru
- Education: University of California (MA, PhD); Department of Economics
- Scientific career
- Fields: Economics
- Workplaces: University of the Pacific (Peru); University of California, Los Angeles; International Food Policy Research Institute
- Website: Personal website

Maximo Torero (born 27 May 1967) is a Peruvian economist. He is currently the chief economist of the Food and Agriculture Organization of the United Nations (FAO) in Rome, Italy.

== Education and career ==
Torero earned his MA (1993) and Ph.D. (1998) in economics from the University of California, Los Angeles (UCLA), where he also conducted postdoctoral research. He earned his BA in economics from University of the Pacific (Peru) in Lima, Peru.

Between 2016 and 2018, Torero served as Executive Director at the World Bank Group in Washington, D.C., representing Argentina, Bolivia, Chile, Paraguay, Peru, and Uruguay. In this capacity, he took part in negotiations on the World Bank Group’s 2018 capital package, which led to a paid-in capital increase of US$7.5 billion for the International Bank for Reconstruction and Development (IBRD), US$5.5 billion for the International Finance Corporation, and a US$52.6 billion callable capital increase for IBRD.

From 2004 to 2016, Torero served as Division Director for Trade and Institutions at the International Food Policy Research Institute (IFPRI) in Washington, D.C. During his tenure, he was involved in the establishment of the Agricultural Market Information System (AMIS), which was created at the request of the G20 in response to the 2007–2008 global food price crisis. He also led the Global Research Program on Institutions and Infrastructure for Market Development and was the director for Latin America.

Torero was the chief of party for a US$449.6 million investment (2007-2012) by the Millennium Challenge Corporation (MCC) in rural infrastructure with a significant component of water and sanitation in El Salvador. The five-year investment consisted of three projects: connectivity project, human development project, and productive development project. The Connectivity Project included the Northern Transnational Highway (NTH) and the Network of Connecting Roads (NCR). Torero led the production of the reports, data and methodology with his team at IFPRI on El Salvador - Northern Transnational Highway.

Before joining IFPRI, he worked as a senior researcher and a member of the executive committee at Group of Analysis for Development (GRADE) in Peru.

Torero has worked on property rights, specifically urban and rural titling and crop choices. His work, cited in “The Mystery of Capital Deepens” (The Economist, August 24, 2006), shows that households with title were more likely to secure a loan from the government-backed Materials Bank.

He is an Alexander von Humboldt Fellow at the University of Bonn in Germany. He was an associate professor at the University of the Pacific (Peru) from 1999 to 2022.

== Awards and honours ==
In 2014, he was awarded the Order of Agricultural Merit (Chevalier dans l’Ordre du Mérite Agricole) by the French government.

He is the recipient of the Ford Foundation Fellowship, the Inter-American Development Bank Fellowship, and Fulbright Program Fellowship. He also received 1997-1998 Ford Foundation ISOP Interdisciplinary Program for Students of Development Areas, University of California Dissertation Year Fellowship; in 2000, he received the Georg Foster Research Fellowship of the Alexander von Humboldt Foundation.

He has twice won the World Award for Outstanding Research on Development given by the Global Development Network. In 2000, he and Javier Escobal received the award for their joint work on the geographical dimension of development, titled "How to Face an Adverse Geography: The Role of Private and Public Assets".

== Selected publications ==
Journal articles and book chapters

- Mitra Sandip, Dilip Mookherjee, Sujata Visaria, and Maximo Torero. Asymmetric Information and Middleman Margins: An Experiment with West Bengal Potato Farmers. The Review of Economics and Statistics, MIT Press, vol. 100(1), pp. 1–13, March 2018.
- Manuel Barron and Maximo Torero. Household electrification and indoor air pollution. Journal of Environmental Economics and Management, Volume 86, 2017:81-92.
- Sandip Mitra, Dilip Mookherjee, Maximo Torero, and Sujata Visaria. Asymmetric Information and Middleman Margins: An Experiment with Indian Potato Farmers.vol. 100(1),2017:1-13
- Carlos Martins-Filho, Feng Yao, and Maximo Torero. Nonparametric Estimation of Conditional Value-at-risk and Expected Shortfall Based on Extreme Value Theory. Econometric Theory, 2018, vol. 34 (1):23–67.
- Alberto Chong, Isabelle Cohen, Erica Field, Eduardo Nakasone, and Maximo Torero. 2016. Iron Deficiency and Schooling Attainment in Peru. American Economic Journal: Applied Economics, 8(4): 222–55.

Books

- Devaux, André, ed.; Torero, Maximo, ed.; Donovan, Jason, ed.; and Horton, Douglas E., ed. 2016. Innovation for inclusive value-chain development: Successes and challenges. Washington, D.C.: International Food Policy Research Institute (IFPRI).
- Kalkuhl, Matthias, ed.; von Braun, Joachim, ed.; and Torero, Maximo, ed. 2016. Food price volatility and its implications for food security and policy. Cham, Switzerland: Springer.
