= Seema Jayachandran =

American economist

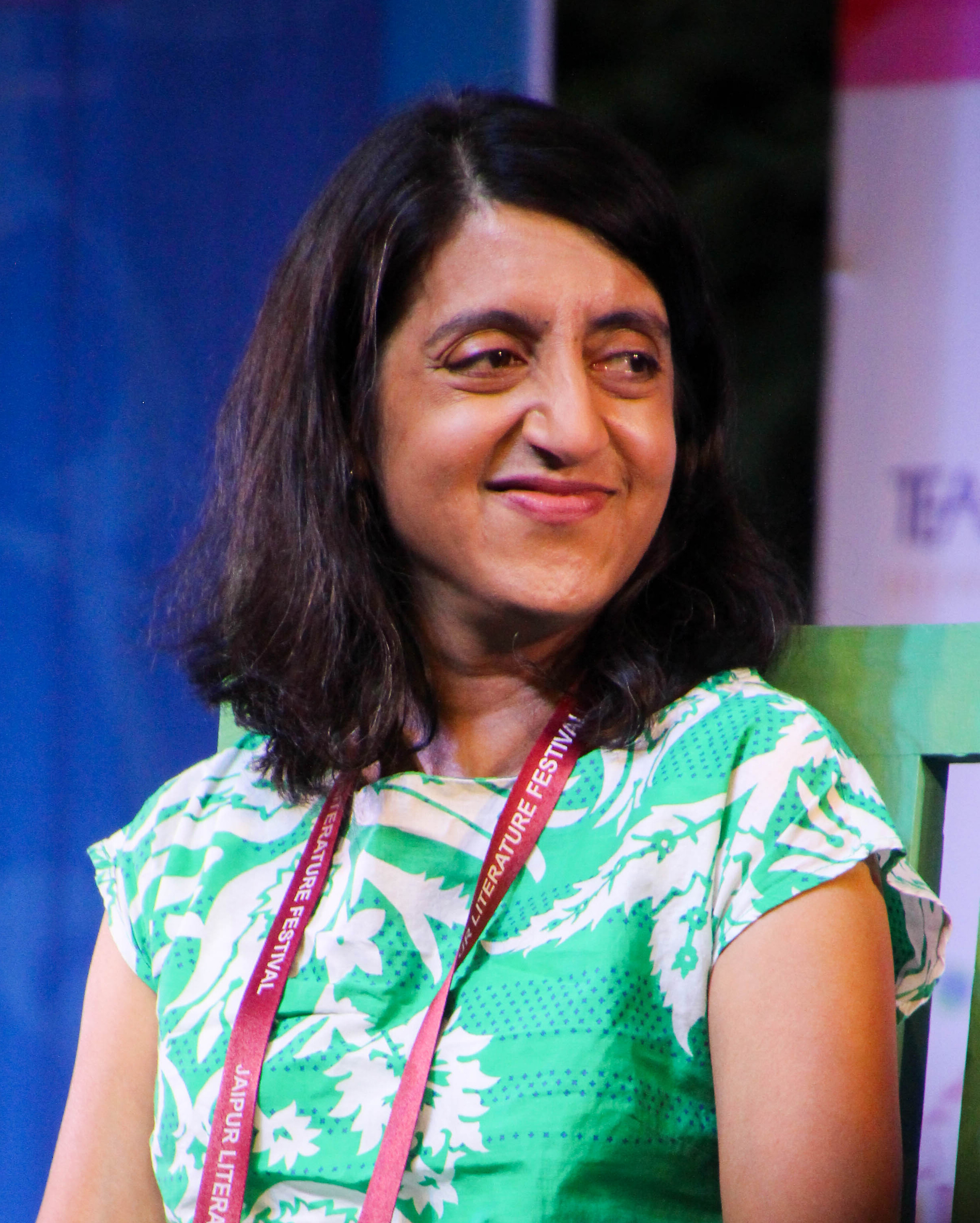
- Seema Jayachandran in 2025
- Education: Massachusetts Institute of Technology, University of Oxford, Harvard University
- Awards: Sloan Research Fellowship, 2011; NSF CAREER Award, 2011
- Scientific career
- Fields: Economics
- Workplaces: University of California at Berkeley, Stanford University, Northwestern University, Princeton University
- Doctoral advisor: Michael Kremer
- Website: www.seemajayachandran.com

Seema Jayachandran is an economist who currently works as Professor of Economics at Princeton University. Her research interests include development economics, health economics, and labor economics.

== Biography ==
Seema Jayachandran earned a BS in Electrical Engineering from Massachusetts Institute of Technology in 1993. As a Marshall Scholar, she studied Physics and Philosophy at the University of Oxford. In 1997, she began graduate studies in physics at Harvard University, but completed a PhD in economics in 2004.

After her graduation and a term as post-doctoral fellow as RWJ Scholar in Health Policy at The University of California at Berkeley, she became an assistant professor of economics at Stanford University (2006–11). In 2011, Jayachandran moved to Northwestern University as associate professor of economics before becoming a full professor in 2018. In 2022, she moved to Princeton University. In parallel, she has held visiting appointments at Harvard University and Massachusetts Institute of Technology. She also maintains affiliations as a Research associate with the National Bureau of Economic Research (NBER), as a fellow of the Bureau for Research in Economic Analysis of Development (BREAD) as well as with the Abdul Latif Jameel Poverty Action Lab (J-PAL). Moreover, she performs editorial duties for the academic journals American Economic Journal: Applied Economics, Quarterly Journal of Economics, Journal of Economic Perspectives, and Science. Finally, she has worked as a consultant for United Nations Development Program and the Federal Reserve Bank of Chicago.

In addition to her research, she has written for The New York Times, appeared on Science Friday, and done a "Science Ask Me Anything" on Reddit.

== Research ==
Seema Jayachandran's research focuses on health, development economics, and environmental economics. Her research has been acknowledged through several awards, including a Sloan Research Fellowship in 2011, an NSF CAREER Award in 2011, and the Sustainability Science Award from the Ecological Society of America in 2018.

Much of Jayachandran's work is in development economics, including maternal and child health in Africa and South Asia. A substantial body of her research concerns gender differences. In India, she finds that there is a tension between the desire for smaller families and the desire to have at least one son, making son preference stronger as family sizes shrink. She estimates that fertility decline can explain one-third to one-half of the increase in the number of "missing women" in India. In work with Erica Field and Rohini Pande, she also finds evidence that patriarchic gender norms in India constrain female entrepreneurship, with Muslim women (the sociocultural group with the most restrictions) being unable to benefit from business training.

Another important focus of Jayachandran's research revolves around deforestation in Indonesia and Uganda. In a 2008 publication, she showed that massive forest fires in Indonesia caused air pollution that had adverse impacts on pregnant women and babies in poor communities, leading to more than 15,000 fetal and infant deaths. In 2017, with a group of collaborators, she published research in Science showing that landowners in Uganda would preserve forests if they were paid to preserve forest cover. She found that landowners who were offered a conservation contract only cleared 4% of land as opposed to the 9% cleared in villages without a contract. This delayed 3000 metric tons of carbon dioxide at a cost of 46 cents per ton. These results were covered in the New York Times.

One of her most cited articles is about the impact that the departure of US Senator Jim Jeffords from the Republican to the Democratic Parties in 2001 had on the valuation of companies that had previously donated large sums of money to Republican Senators. This was the first economics paper she wrote.

=== Selected works ===
- Jayachandran, Seema (October 1, 2006). "The Jeffords effect". Journal of Law and Economics. 49 (2): 397–425. doi:10.1086/501091. ISSN 0022-2186. S2CID 233649.
- Jayachandran, Seema. "Selling labor low: Wage responses to productivity shocks in developing countries." Journal of political Economy 114, no. 3 (2006): 538–575.
- Jayachandran, Seema, and Adriana Lleras-Muney. "Life expectancy and human capital investments: Evidence from maternal mortality declines." The Quarterly Journal of Economics 124, no. 1 (2009): 349–397.
- Jayachandran, Seema (October 2, 2009). "Air Quality and Early-Life Mortality Evidence from Indonesia's Wildfires". Journal of Human Resources. 44 (4): 916–954. doi:10.3368/jhr.44.4.916. ISSN 0022-166X. S2CID 15390085.
- Jayachandran, Seema, and Ilyana Kuziemko. "Why do mothers breastfeed girls less than boys? Evidence and implications for child health in India." The Quarterly journal of economics 126, no. 3 (2011): 1485–1538.
- Field, Erica; Jayachandran, Seema; Pande, Rohini (May 1, 2010). "Do Traditional Institutions Constrain Female Entrepreneurship? A Field Experiment on Business Training in India". American Economic Review. 100 (2). American Economic Association: 125–129. doi:10.1257/aer.100.2.125. ISSN 0002-8282.
- Jayachandran, Seema, and Michael Kremer. "Odious debt." American Economic Review 96, no. 1 (2006): 82–92.
- Jayachandran, Seema; de Laat, Joost; Lambin, Eric F.; Stanton, Charlotte Y.; Audy, Robin; Thomas, Nancy E. (July 21, 2017). "Cash for carbon: A randomized trial of payments for ecosystem services to reduce deforestation". Science. 357 (6348). American Association for the Advancement of Science (AAAS): 267–273. Bibcode:2017Sci...357..267J. doi:10.1126/science.aan0568. ISSN 0036-8075. PMID 28729505.
