= Operational sex ratio =

Quantitative ratio of sexually active population

In the evolutionary biology of sexual reproduction, operational sex ratio (OSR) is the ratio of sexually competing males that are ready to mate to sexually competing females that are ready to mate, or alternatively the local ratio of fertilizable females to sexually active males at any given time. This differs from physical sex ratio or adult sex ratio which simply includes all individuals, including those that are sexually inactive or do not compete for mates.

The theory of OSR hypothesizes that the operational sex ratio affects the mating competition of males and females in a population. This concept is especially useful in the study of sexual selection since it is a measure of how intense sexual competition is in a species, and also in the study of the relationship of sexual selection to sexual dimorphism. The OSR is closely linked to the "potential rate of reproduction" of the two sexes; that is, how fast they each could reproduce if not limited by the reproductive rate of the other sex. Usually variation in potential reproductive rates creates bias in the OSR and this in turn will affect the strength of sexual selection. The OSR is said to be biased toward a particular sex when sexually ready members of that sex are more abundant. For example, a male-biased OSR means that there are more sexually competing males than sexually competing females.

== Some factors that affect OSR ==
The Adult Sex Ratio (ASR) influences the OSR because if there is an imbalance in the number of adult females and males in a population, this can be carried on to the number of each sex ready to mate. ASR in wild populations are rarely balanced, due for example to differences between the sexes in developmental rates or survival probabilities to adulthood.

The operational sex ratio is affected by the length of time each sex spends in caring for young or in recovering from mating. For example, if females cease mating activity to care for young, but males do not, then more males would be ready to mate, thus creating a male-biased OSR. One aspect of gestation and recovery time would be clutch loss. Clutch loss is when offspring or a group of offspring is lost, due to an accident, predation, etc. This, in turn, affects how long reproductive cycles will be in both males and females. If the males were to invest more time in the care of their offspring, they would be spending less time mating. This pushes the population towards a female-biased OSR and vice versa. Whether or not it is the males or females investing more care in their offspring, if they were to lose their offspring for whatever reason, this would then change the OSR to be less biased because the once occupied sex becomes available to mate again.

As aforementioned, another major factor that influences OSR is potential rate of reproduction (PRR). Any sexual differences in the PRR will also change the OSR, so it is important to look at factors that change PRR as well. These include constraints to environmental factors such as food or nesting sites. For example, if males are required to provide a nutrient high gift before mating (most likely food) then when nutrients available is high, the OSR will be male-biased because there is plenty of nutrients available to provide gifts. However, if nutrients is low, less males will be ready to reproduce, causing the population to have a female-biased OSR. Another example would be if, in a certain species, males provided care for offspring and a nest. If the availability of nesting sites decreased, we would see the population trend towards a more female-biased OSR because only a small number of males actually have a nest while all the females, regardless of a nest or not, are still producing eggs.

== Some factors that OSR predicts ==
A major factor that OSR can predict is the opportunity for sexual selection. As the OSR becomes more biased, the sex that is in excess will tend to undergo more competition for mates and therefore undergo strong sexual selection. Intensity of competition is also a factor that can be predicted by OSR. According to sexual selection theory, whichever sex is more abundant is expected to compete more strongly and the sex that is less abundant is expected to be "choosier" in who they decide to mate with. It would be expected that when an OSR is more biased to one sex than the other, that one would observe more interaction and competition from the sex that is more available to mate. When the population is more female-biased, more female-female competition is observed and the opposite is seen for a male population where a male bias would cause more male-male interaction and competitiveness. Though both sexes may be competing for mates, it is important to remember that the biased OSR predicts which sex is the predominant competitor (the sex that exhibits the most competition). OSR can also predict what will happen to mate guarding in a population. As OSR becomes more biased to one sex, it can be observed that mate-guarding will increase. This is likely due to the fact that rival numbers (number of a certain sex that are also ready to mate) are increased. If a population is male-biased then there are a lot more rival males to compete for a mate, meaning that those who have a mate already are more likely to guard the mate that they have.

It is also important to consider that OSR has limited predictive power, because engaging in competition is not always the best strategy in response to a highly competitive environment. For example, alternative reproductive tactics can evolve where individuals seek fertilisation through other means than direct competition.

== Further examples of factors that affect OSR ==
- Sex in age at maturity is another possible factor that can affect OSR. If it takes one sex longer to mature than the other, it would be expected to see a biased OSR of the sex that matured faster, most of the time.
- Migration schedules differ between sexes which eventually leads to seasonal changes in the OSR. For example, if males arrive first to the migration site, then for a certain amount of time the population would have a male-biased OSR.
- Spatial distribution can also cause bias in the OSR. If there is a wide spatial distribution difference between the sexes, one would see a bias in the OSR depending on what area was being observed. There might be more males than females in one location causing a male-biased OSR in that particular location.
- Mortality can also change the OSR of a population. For example, if there is a high mortality rate in males of a specific species one would most likely observe a female-biased OSR.
- Temperature can play a large part in OSR of a population. In many reptiles, sex determination is dependent on temperature of the environment during embryonic development. Consistently warm or cool environments can result in large biases in sex ratio of a population.

== See also ==
- Age and female fertility
