= Michael Kremer =

American economist and Nobel laureate (born 1964)

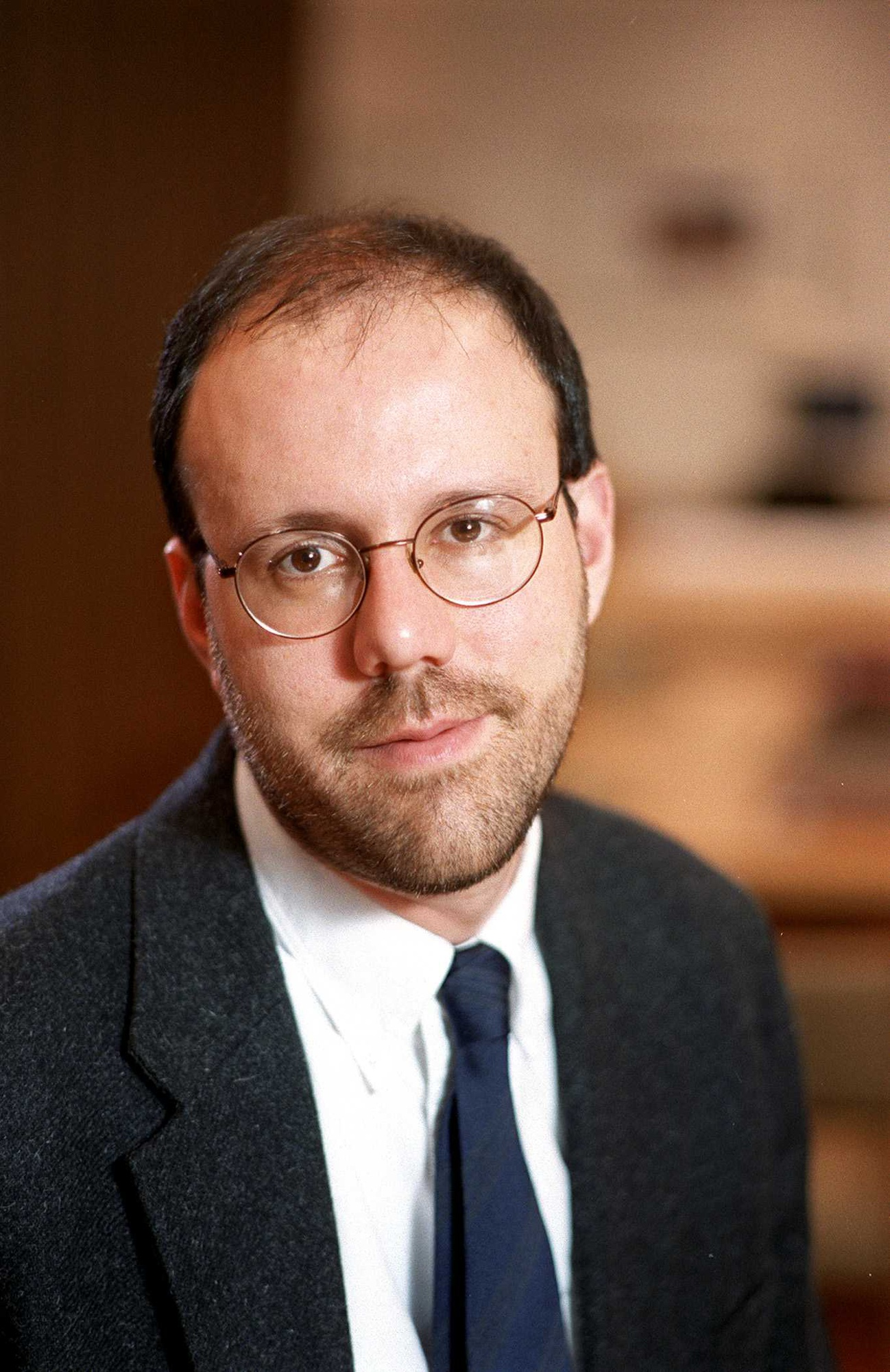
- Kremer in 2020
- Born: Michael Robert Kremer; November 12, 1964 (age 62); New York City, U.S.
- Spouse: Rachel Glennerster

Academic background
- Education: Harvard University (AB, PhD)
- Thesis: Two Essays on Economic Growth (1992)
- Doctoral advisor: Robert Barro • Eric Maskin • Greg Mankiw

Academic work
- Discipline: Development economics Health economics
- Institutions: UChicago (2020–present); NBER (1993–present); Harvard (1999–2020); MIT (1992–1999)
- Doctoral students: Edward Miguel • Seema Jayachandran • Karthik Muralidharan • Nava Ashraf • Benjamin Olken • Dina Pomeranz • Emily Oster • Asim Ijaz Khwaja
- Notable ideas: O-ring theory of economic development • Randomized controlled trials
- Awards: Nobel Prize in Economics (2019); MacArthur Fellowship (1997)
- Website: Information at IDEAS / RePEc

Michael Robert Kremer (born November 12, 1964) is an American development economist currently serving as university professor in economics at the University of Chicago and director of the Development Innovation Lab at the Becker Friedman Institute for Research in Economics. Kremer formerly served as the Gates Professor of Developing Societies at Harvard University, a role he held from 2003 to 2020. In 2019, Kremer was jointly awarded the Nobel Memorial Prize in Economic Sciences, together with Esther Duflo and Abhijit Banerjee, "for their experimental approach to alleviating global poverty".

In addition to his academic appointments, Kremer is the co-founder of the Bureau for Research and Economic Analysis of Development (BREAD), a member of the National Academy of Sciences, and a Research Associate at the National Bureau of Economic Research. In 2008, he was elected a Fellow of the Econometric Society. Kremer is also the Scientific Director of Development Innovation Ventures, a program of the United States Agency for International Development aimed at maximizing the impact of development spending through rigorous impact evaluation.

== Early life and education ==
Michael Robert Kremer was born on November 12, 1964 to Eugene and Sara Lillian (née Kimmel) Kremer in New York City. Both his mother and father were the children of Jewish immigrants, from Poland and Austria-Poland, respectively. His father taught architecture at Kansas State University, and his mother was a professor of English at the same institution, where she specialized in American Jewish and Holocaust literature. Kremer attended Manhattan High School in Manhattan, Kansas, where his mother was formerly a teacher. Beginning in fifth grade, he took classes at Kansas State University, taking enough credits to achieve sophomore standing by his junior year of high school.

He left high school a year early to attend Harvard University, where he received his AB in Social Studies in 1985, magna cum laude and Phi Beta Kappa. Kremer wrote his senior thesis comparing an employment guarantee program in India with a food subsidy scheme in Sri Lanka.

After graduating from Harvard, Kremer worked for a year as a teacher and administrator at Eshisiru Secondary School in Kakamega District of Kenya. Inspired by the experience, he co-founded WorldTeach, a Cambridge-based nonprofit organization focused on international development and education, where he currently serves as President of the Board. After his time in Kenya, Kremer returned to Harvard University, where he received a PhD in Economics in 1992. Kremer's dissertation research was supervised by Robert Barro, Eric Maskin, and Greg Mankiw, and focused on the determinants of long-run economic growth. His PhD research was supported by a fellowship from the National Science Foundation, and won the David A. Wells Prize, awarded annually to the best dissertation in the Harvard Department of Economics.

Kremer is the husband of Rachel Glennerster, president of the Center for Global Development, an associate professor of economics at the University of Chicago, and the former Chief Economist of the UK Department for International Development.

== Career ==
In September 2026, the World Bank Group appointed Kremer as its chief economist and senior vice president for development economics, effective October 1, 2026. In that role, he is to lead the institution's research, data, and analytical agenda.

Kremer began his academic career at the Massachusetts Institute of Technology (MIT), where he served as a postdoctoral fellow from 1992 to 1993. He was a visiting assistant professor at the University of Chicago in spring 1993, and joined MIT as an assistant professor the same year. He was promoted to associate professor in 1996, and again to professor of economics in 1998. In 1999, he joined Harvard University, where he served as Gates Professor of Developing Societies from 2003 to 2020. After his time at Harvard, Kremer again joined the University of Chicago, where he is a university professor in economics and director of the Development Innovation Lab at the Becker Friedman Institute for Research in Economics.

In addition to his academic appointments, Kremer is a fellow of the Econometric Society, a member of the National Academy of Sciences, and a fellow of the American Academy of Arts and Sciences. In 2002, he co-founded the Bureau for Research and Economic Analysis of Development, a non-profit learned society promoting research on the microeconomics of development. Since 1999, Kremer has also been a research associate at the National Bureau of Economic Research.

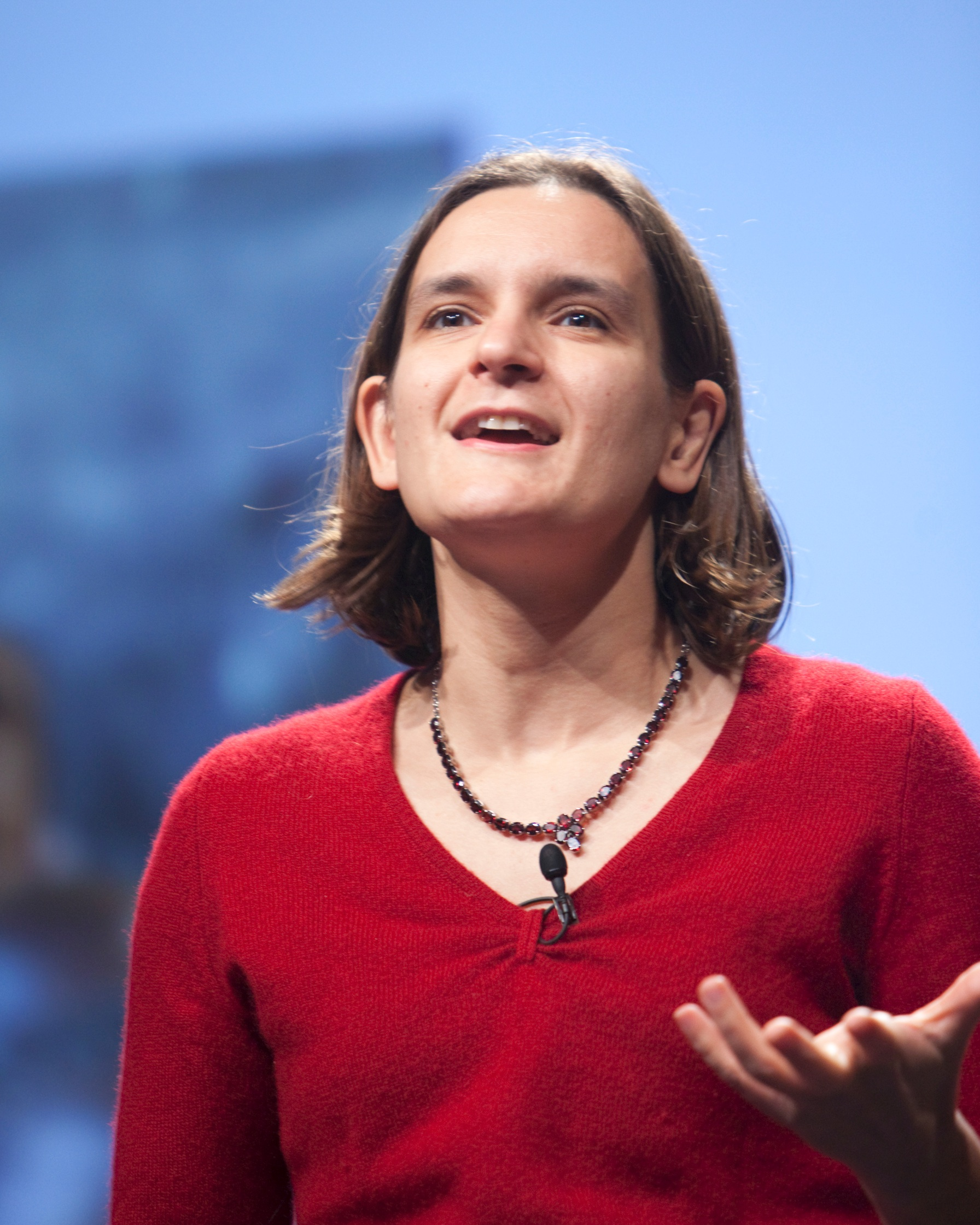
Esther Duflo, joint winner of the 2019 Nobel Memorial Prize

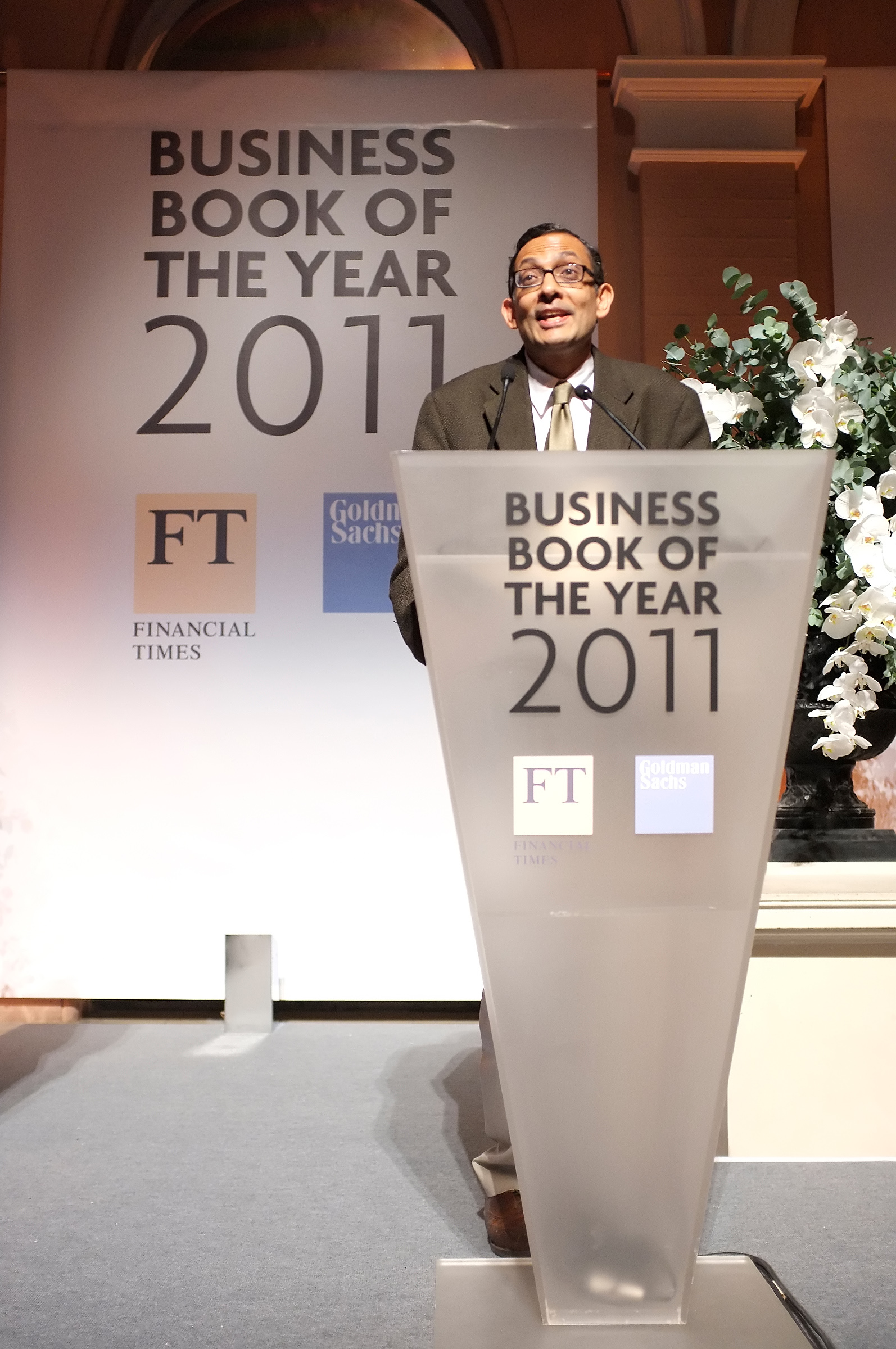
Abhijit Banerjee, joint winner of the 2019 Nobel Memorial Prize

According to Research Papers in Economics (RePEc), Kremer is among the most cited economists in the world, ranking in the top 130 authors by total research output as of November 2023. He has focused his research on economic growth and poverty alleviation, particularly as it relates to education and health. Alongside Abhijit Banerjee and Esther Duflo, Kremer has helped establish the effectiveness of randomized controlled trials to test proposed antipoverty measures. Describing Kremer's early use of pioneering experimental methods, Duflo said that Kremer "was there from the very beginning, and took enormous risks. [...] He is a visionary."

Inspired by a randomized evaluation co-authored with Edward Miguel showing substantial effects of school-based deworming programs on educational attainment and health, Kremer co-founded the Deworm the World Initiative, which has since 2014 delivered 1.8 billion treatments to children around the world. The scheme, run by non-profit Evidence Action, was ranked a GiveWell top charity from 2013 to 2022, considered among the best in the world for social impact per marginal dollar spent. Since 2009, Kremer has been a member of Giving What We Can, an effective altruism organization whose members pledge to give 10% or more of their lifetime income to effective charities.

In 2010, Kremer co-founded Development Innovation Ventures, an evidence based innovation fund administered by USAID aimed at testing and scaling new approaches to poverty alleviation. The program promotes a venture capital approach to development finance, prioritizing rapid distribution of grants and scale-up of policies successful in pilot stages. Since its founding, DIV has funded 277 grants in 49 countries, generating an estimated $17 in social benefit for each dollar invested in the program.

From 2011 to 2014, Kremer co-led an experimental evaluation of an SMS-based information service in which Kenyan smallholder farmers were texted agricultural advice. The program increased yields by 8%, inspiring Kremer to co-found Precision Development (PxD), a non-profit organization building digital information services for the world's poor. In 2020, PxD's programs had 5.7 million users, at an average cost per user of $1.61.

Kremer has also pursued research on vaccine development and financing. He developed an interest in the subject after contracting malaria while traveling in Kenya. In a 2004 book with his wife, Rachel Glennerster, Kremer advocates for the creation of advance market commitments, in which governments enter into legally binding agreements with pharmaceutical or biotechnology companies, promising to purchase given quantities of vaccines or medications provided they meet certain benchmarks for safety and efficacy. In response to Kremer's research, a consortium of donors including the Bill & Melinda Gates Foundation and national governments such as Canada, Italy, and Norway pledged $1.5 billion as an advance market commitment for pneumococcal vaccines. The AMC has inspired the creation of three different vaccinations, which have collectively immunized 150 million children.

Kremer's research was also widely cited during the COVID-19 pandemic as a model for how to quickly develop vaccines through public-private partnership. In response to requests for consultation by several governments, Kremer founded the Accelerating Health Technologies Group, a consortium of academics including Glennerster, Susan Athey, and Jonathan Levin aimed at accelerating the wide-scale distribution of effective vaccines. The group advised the US government on Operation Warp Speed, a public-private partnership announced in 2020 that funded successful COVID-19 vaccines such as those developed by Pfizer–BioNTech and Moderna. Chris Blattman, a professor at the Harris School of Public Policy, has described Kremer as one of the world's "leading thinkers on incentives for creating new vaccine research."

== Research ==
Kremer's research focuses on economic growth and poverty alleviation, particularly as it relates to health and education. Along with Abhijit Banerjee and Esther Duflo, he is a leading proponent of the use of randomized controlled trials in development economics, a contribution recognized by the 2019 Nobel Memorial Prize in Economic Sciences.

=== O-ring theory of economic development ===
Kremer's dissertation research examined the determinants of long-run economic growth. Among his earliest contributions was the O-ring theory of economic development, named for the Space Shuttle Challenger disaster, in which a cascading failure was caused by the malfunctioning of a single small component. Kremer's insight was that complex products (like the space shuttle) often require completing many steps correctly for the final product to have any value. Kremer suggested this would make high-skilled workers complements to each other, meaning wages for high-skilled workers will be higher in an economic environment where other workers are also highly skilled. The O-ring theory has been recognized as a leading explanation for human capital flight and cross-country wage inequality. The framework has also been extended by other scholars, who have incorporated into the model "non O-ring" sectors without skill complementarities.

Kremer's work on the O-ring theory was inspired by his time in Kenya, when he organized a training session for WorldTeach volunteers, but forgot to purchase toilet paper for the event. The experience demonstrated how even small failures can derail a larger enterprise, such that production processes often require many complementary high-skilled workers to succeed.

=== Population growth ===
During his graduate studies, Kremer also pursued research on the link between population growth and technological change. In a paper in The Quarterly Journal of Economics, Kremer empirically tests the hypotheses of macroeconomic models predicting a positive relationship between population levels and technological innovation because of the non-rivalry of ideas. He shows that among societies with no technological contact and similar levels of productivity, those with higher populations saw faster improvements in technology.

=== Species endangerment ===
In other theoretical work, Kremer studies the optimal policy responses to species endangerment. In a paper with Charles Morcom in the American Economic Review, Kremer argues that because the price of ivory is positively associated with poachers’ incentives to kill endangered elephants, governments should accumulate stockpiles of ivory, releasing them onto the open market when elephant populations reach dangerous levels. He argues that doing so can counteract increased incentives to poach, thereby preventing species endangerment.

The policy value of Kremer and Morcom's work was criticized by Erwin H. Bulte and co-authors, who argue in a reply in the American Economic Review that government ownership of ivory may incentivize the preemptive extermination of endangered species, thereby allowing stores to be legally sold under CITES. They propose instead that stores of ivory are managed by intergovernmental conservation organizations who do not face the same incentives as governments to maximize revenues in the short-term.

=== Deworming ===
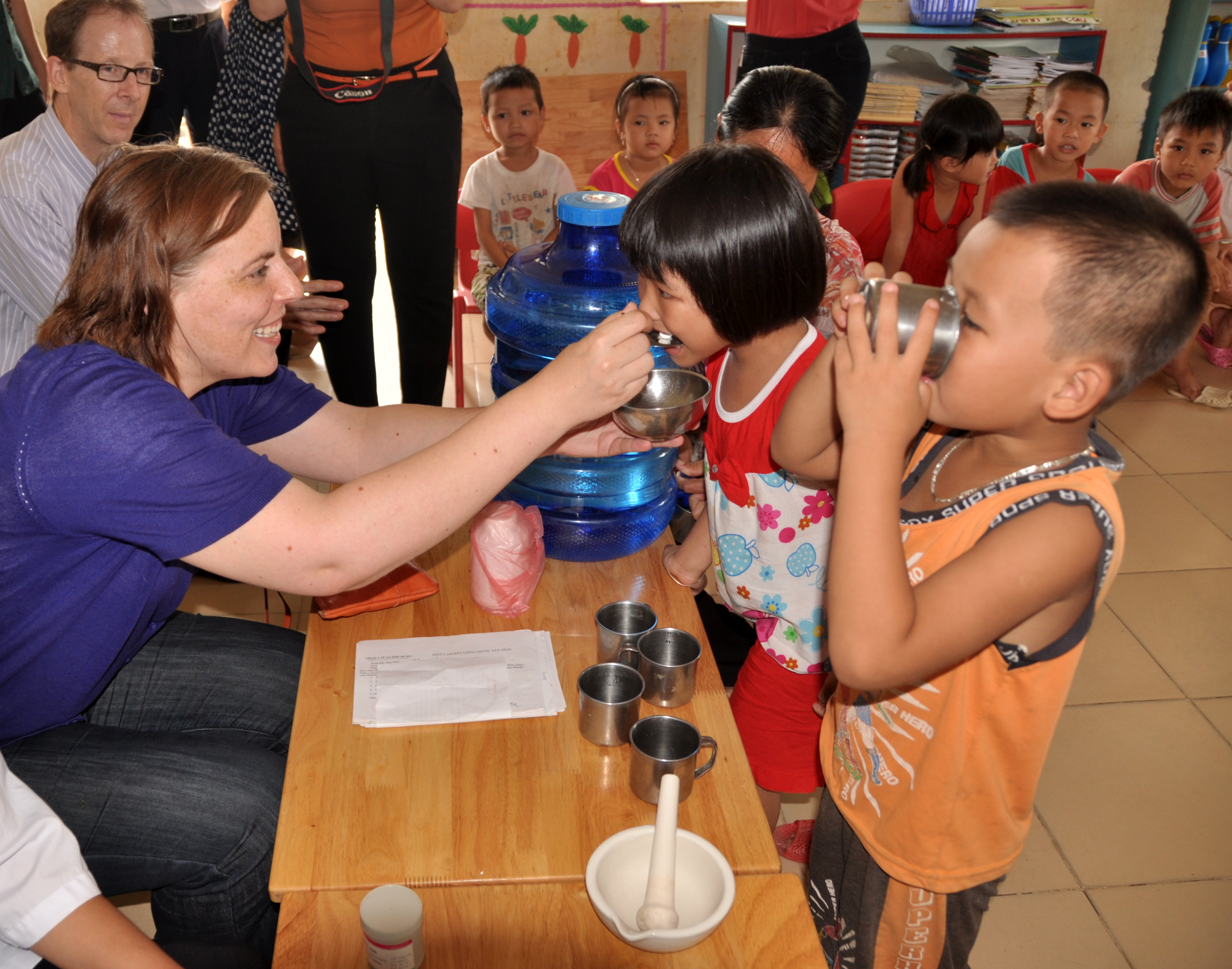
USAID delivers deworming medication in Vietnam, 2013

Among Kremer's most recognized work examines the effects of deworming treatments on the health and educational outcomes of children. After completing his PhD, Kremer traveled with Rachel Glennerster to Kenya on vacation, where he met a friend from his time as a teacher and administrator. The friend was planning on rolling out a new scheme to help elementary school children that included the distribution of deworming medication. Kremer recommended that the scheme be implemented in a random order, such that the effects of treatment could be evaluated rigorously, as in a randomized clinical trial. Treatments were rolled out in 1998, and the results of the study were eventually published in Econometrica by Kremer and Edward Miguel, his PhD student, in 2004. The experiment found large effects of deworming on health and education outcomes, with a reduction in school absenteeism of 25%. The program's success sparked the Deworm the World Initiative, which has since 2014 delivered 1.8 billion deworming treatments to children around the world.

In 2021, Kremer and Miguel published a long-term follow up of the initial deworming program in the Proceedings of the National Academy of Sciences, showing that those who received an extra two to three years of deworming treatment as a child have consumer spending that is 14% higher than their counterparts ten years later. They also find that deworming increases the likelihood of living in an urban area, and decreases the likelihood of working in agriculture (a sector with generally lower wages and less capacity for growth).

=== Public sector absenteeism ===
Another strand of Kremer's work concerns public sector absenteeism in the developing world, particularly in public education and health systems. In work with Karthik Muralidharan, Jeffrey Hammer, Halsey Rogers, and Nazmul Chaudhury, Kremer shows via unannounced visits to Indian public schools that teacher absenteeism sits at 25%, varying from 15% in Maharashtra to 42% in Jharkhand. Subsequent research has estimated the salary cost of this absenteeism at $1.5 billion per year in India.

In wider work covering Bangladesh, Ecuador, India, Indonesia, Peru, and Uganda, Kremer and co-authors show that health worker absenteeism averages 35% across countries. Their work has inspired randomized evaluations of several novel policy solutions to public sector absenteeism, such as camera and mobile phone based monitoring schemes.

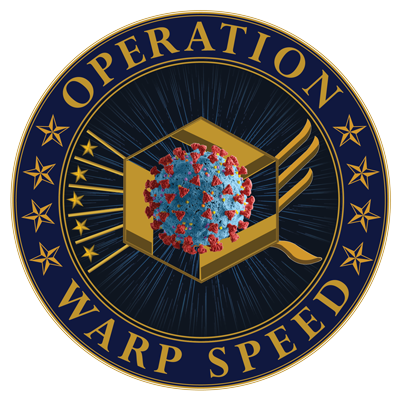
Logo of Operation Warp Speed, a public-private partnership inspired by Kremer's work on AMCs

=== Advance market commitments ===
Kremer has also pursued research on innovation in the pharmaceutical industry. He and Rachel Glennerster have been leading proponents of advance market commitments, legally binding agreements in which governments agree to purchase a given quantity of a vaccine or other item at a profitable price, provided it meets certain standards for efficacy and safety. Kremer promoted the idea in a 2004 book, in addition to a widely cited 2003 report published by the Center for Global Development.

In a 2020 working paper, Kremer, Jonathan Levin, and Christopher Tucker review the economic case for AMCs, showing theoretically that they can effectively prevent the hold-up problem that emerges when pharmaceutical firms cannot bargain on prices until after vaccines or other drugs are developed. Advance market commitments have been suggested as a means of spurring investment across a wide variety of industries, including pharmaceuticals, carbon removal, and renewable energy.

== Recognition ==
Kremer is among the most cited development economists, ranking in the top 130 economists in the world by total research output according to Research Papers in Economics. The Open Syllabus Project ranks him as the 28th most cited author on the syllabi of university economics courses. In 2006, he received a Scientific American 50 Award, awarded to influencers from research, business, and politics with "an interest in leading technological innovation as a force for the public good."

=== Nobel Memorial Prize in Economics ===
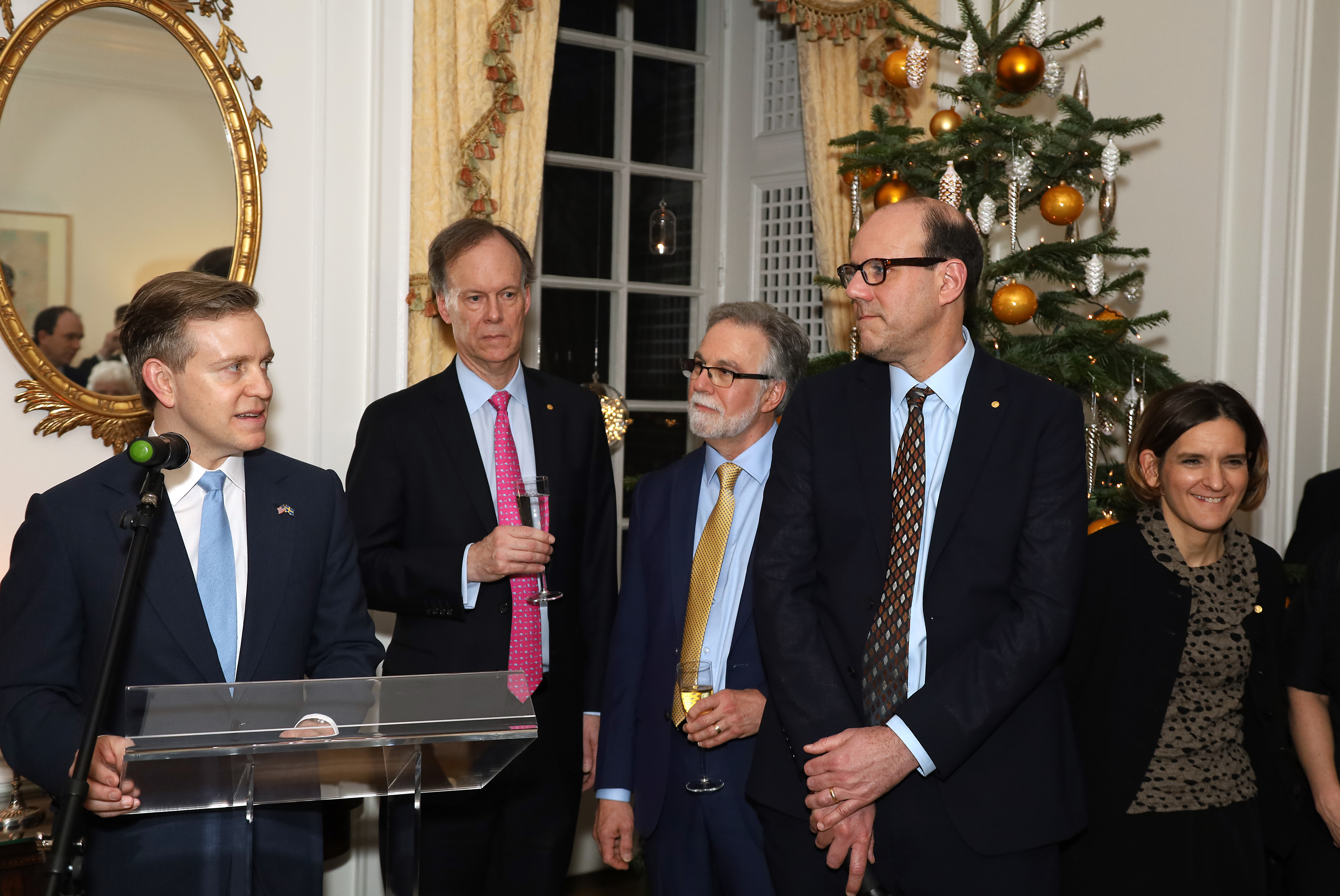
Kremer receiving the Nobel Memorial Prize in Economic Sciences

In 2019, Kremer was chosen as the co-winner of the Nobel Memorial Prize in Economic Sciences, along with Esther Duflo and Abhijit Banerjee of MIT "for their experimental approach to alleviating global poverty." Speaking of Kremer, Duflo, and Banerjee's work popularizing the use of randomized controlled trials (RCTs) in development economics, the Nobel committee noted that the "[t]heir experimental research methods now entirely dominate development economics." In a tribute to Kremer, Berkeley professor Edward Miguel notes that "Michael’s pioneering work also accelerated innovation in original data collection in development and made it normal and even downright necessary for development economists to spend extended time in the societies that they study." Amartya Sen, a Harvard based economist and winner of the 1998 Nobel Memorial Prize in Economic Sciences, stressed that Kremer "has made an outstanding contribution in combining economic theory and sophisticated empirical techniques and applying it to critical policy issues in development economics."

Kremer's Nobel lecture, entitled "Experimentation, Innovation, and Economics" provides an overview of the experimental revolution in development economics, arguing that RCTs can be a powerful tool for influencing public policy and promoting innovation. To do this, he draws on many examples of his own work, including that on deworming and fertilizer usage.

Kremer, Duflo, and Banerjee donated the winnings associated with their prize to the Weiss Fund for Research in Development Economics, a University of Chicago based grant-making body supporting frontier research in development economics. Writing of their decision to do so, Kremer noted that "Abhijit, Esther and I truly believe that our Nobel Prize is an award for the development economics community, and we wanted to invest it in a way that provides new opportunities for research."

=== Other awards and honors ===
==== Economics prizes ====
- David A. Wells Prize for Best Economics Dissertation (1992), Harvard University
- Presidential Early Career Award for Scientists and Engineers (1996)
- Kenneth J. Arrow Award for Best Paper in Health Economics (2005), International Health Economics Association
- Juan Luis Londoño Prize for Best Paper Presented by Young Authors at the Latin American and Caribbean Economic Association Conference (2015)

==== Fellowships and invited affiliations ====
- MacArthur Fellowship (1997)
- Fellow of the American Academy of Arts and Sciences (Inducted 2003)
- Fellow of the Econometric Society (Inducted 2008)
- Member, National Academy of Sciences (Inducted 2020)

=== Teaching awards ===
- Llewellyn John and Harriet Manchester Quantrell Award for Excellence in Undergraduate Teaching.

== Selected publications ==
=== Books ===
- Kremer, Michael; Glennerster, Rachel (2004). Strong Medicine: Creating Incentives for Pharmaceutical Research on Neglected Diseases. Princeton University Press.

=== Articles ===
==== Macroeconomics and economic growth ====
- Kremer, Michael (1993). "The O-Ring Theory of Economic Development". The Quarterly Journal of Economics. 108 (3): 551–575. doi:10.2307/2118400. JSTOR 2118400.
- Kremer, Michael (1993). "Population Growth and Technological Change: One Million B.C. to 1990". The Quarterly Journal of Economics. 108 (3): 681–716. doi:10.2307/2118405. JSTOR 2118405.

==== Public health ====
- Miguel, Edward; Kremer, Michael (January 2004). "Worms: Identifying Impacts on Education and Health in the Presence of Treatment Externalities". Econometrica. 72 (1): 159–217. doi:10.1111/j.1468-0262.2004.00481.x.
- Hamory, Joan; Miguel, Edward; Walker, Michael; Kremer, Michael; Baird, Sarah (April 6, 2021). "Twenty-year economic impacts of deworming". Proceedings of the National Academy of Sciences. 118 (14) e2023185118. Bibcode:2021PNAS..11823185H. doi:10.1073/pnas.2023185118. PMC 8040658. PMID 33790017.

==== Education ====
- Kremer, Michael; Chaudhury, Nazmul; Rogers, Halsey; Muralidharan, Karthik; Hammer, Jeffrey (May 2005). "Teacher Absence in India: A Snapshot". Journal of the European Economic Association. 3 (2–3): 658–667. doi:10.1162/jeea.2005.3.2-3.658.
- Duflo, Esther; Dupas, Pascaline; Kremer, Michael (August 2011). "Peer Effects, Teacher Incentives, and the Impact of Tracking: Evidence from a Randomized Evaluation in Kenya". American Economic Review. 101 (5): 1739–1774. doi:10.1257/aer.101.5.1739. hdl:1721.1/73093.

Agriculture

- Duflo, Esther; Kremer, Michael; Robinson, Jonathan (April 2008). "How High Are Rates of Return to Fertilizer? Evidence from Field Experiments in Kenya". American Economic Review. 98 (2): 482–488. doi:10.1257/aer.98.2.482. S2CID 18091970.
- Duflo, Esther; Kremer, Michael; Robinson, Jonathan (October 2011). "Nudging Farmers to Use Fertilizer: Theory and Experimental Evidence from Kenya". American Economic Review. 101 (6): 2350–2390. doi:10.1257/aer.101.6.2350.

==== Innovation ====
- Kremer, Michael; Levin, Jonathan; Snyder, Christopher M. (May 2020). "Advance Market Commitments: Insights from Theory and Experience". AEA Papers and Proceedings. 110: 269–273. doi:10.1257/pandp.20201017.
