= Project Healthy Children =

US-based nonprofit organization

Project Healthy Children (PHC) is a nonprofit organization based in Westborough that works closely with governments in developing countries to provide technical assistance for supporting the design and implementation of food fortification programs in developing countries. In these developing countries, it helps add micronutrients (such as folic acid, iodine, and iron) to fortify foods such as flour, sugar, rice, and oil in order to tackle micronutrient deficiency in developing countries.

It was started by David M. Dodson and Stephanie Dodson Cornell and initially targeted to help fortify food with folic acid to benefit Honduran children, after a trip to Honduras in 2000 where they became aware of the malnutrition problem in Honduras and of the cost-effectiveness of food fortification. In 2008, Project Healthy Children went into Rwanda in order to deal with anemia and goiter. In 2010 PHC helped set up a National Fortification Alliance.

It is listed as a top charity by Giving What We Can.

== Reviews ==
=== Giving What We Can review ===
Giving What We Can (GWWC) published a detailed review of PHC, along with a case study of its food fortification efforts in Rwanda. Based on this, GWWC listed PHC among its two promising charities, alongside the Deworm the World Initiative (but below the established charities Against Malaria Foundation and Schistosomiasis Control Initiative.

PHC was first added to GWWC's list of top charities on May 16, 2013. PHC's status as a promising charity was re-affirmed in GWWC's 2014 end-of-year recommendations.
