= DTW (disambiguation) =

DTW is Detroit Metropolitan Airport, United States—by FAA LID and IATA code.

DTW may also refer to:

- Dance Theater Workshop, New York City, US
- Deworm the World Initiative, a health programme
- Droitwich Spa railway station, Worcestershire, England (GBR:DTW)
- Dynamic time warping, an algorithm on time series
