= WorldTeach =

Non-governmental organization

- Founded: 1986; 40 years ago
- Dissolved: 2019
- Type: Non-governmental organization
- Purpose: Education
- Location: Cambridge, Massachusetts
- Region served: Developing Countries
- Product: Education
- Volunteers: 400/year
- Website: www.worldteach.org

WorldTeach was a non-governmental organization that provided opportunities for individuals to live and work as volunteer teachers in developing countries. It was founded in 1986 by a group of Harvard University students, including economist Michael Kremer. Approximately 300 volunteers were annually placed in year-long and summer programs, with more than 7,500 placed.

== Programs ==
Long-term volunteers were enrolled in or had completed four year college programs, with most volunteers being recent graduates.

Most volunteers taught the English language, with others teaching information technology, mathematics, science, accounting, and HIV/AIDS education. Typically, WorldTeach partnered with Ministries of Education to conduct placements and needs assessment.

Volunteer placements vary widely in the size of the community (300 people to 7 million), age of the students (elementary to adult), and living situation (homestay or apartment). WorldTeach had year-long programs in American Samoa, Ecuador, the Marshall Islands, Namibia, Thailand, and Vietnam.

Year-long program costs were shared between the hosting educational organization and WorldTeach volunteers. According to WorldTeach, the fees covered housing placements, visa sponsorship, health and emergency evacuation insurance, field staff support, in-country orientation (including language and teacher training) and a monthly stipend roughly equal to a local teacher's salary.

WorldTeach also operated (boreal) summer programs in Ecuador, India, Morocco, Namibia, and South Africa. These volunteers were not required to have a college degree, although most were current college students. These programs were not funded by WorldTeach's in-country partners, and students usually paid for them using scholarships or out-of-pocket.

In April 2019, WorldTeach's board of directors voted to cease in-country programs, a model that proved to be unsustainable given the scale, cost structure, and the current market.
