= Michael Greenstone =

American economist

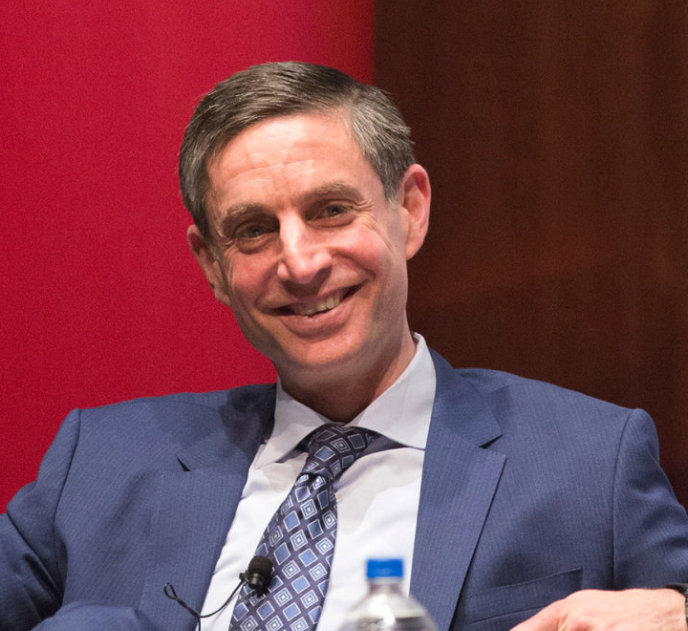
- Michael Greenstone
- Born: December 6, 1968 (age 57); United States
- Education: Swarthmore College (BA); Princeton University (PhD)
- Occupation: American economist
- Website: https://www.michaelgreenstone.com/

Michael Greenstone is an American economist and the Milton Friedman Distinguished Service Professor in Economics at the Harris School of Public Policy of the University of Chicago. He serves as director of the Energy Policy Institute at the University of Chicago (EPIC), director of the Becker Friedman Institute, and co-chair of the Energy and Environment sector at Abdul Latif Jameel Poverty Action Lab (J-PAL). Under the first Obama administration, he served as chief economist on the Council of Economic Advisors. His research interests focus on the nexus between development economics and environmental economics.

== Biography ==
Born in the United States, Michael Greenstone earned a B.A. in economics with High Honors from Swarthmore College in 1991, where he starred and lettered for the men's basketball team, and a Ph.D. in economics from Princeton University in 1998. Thereafter, he worked as a Robert Wood Johnson Scholar at the University of California, Berkeley (UCB, 1998–2000) before becoming an assistant professor of economics at the University of Chicago (2003–06). In 2006, Greenstone moved to MIT, first as associate professor (2003–06) and then as the 3M Professor of Environmental Economics (2006–14). During his tenure at MIT, Greenstone also held visiting appointments at UCB, the University of California Energy Institute, and Stanford University. Most recently, in 2014, he followed a call back to the University of Chicago, where he was made the Milton Friedman Professor in Economics and the college. At the University of Chicago, he further holds positions as director of the Becker Friedman Institute for Economics (BFI), director of the Energy Policy Institute at Chicago (EPIC), and faculty director of the Environment and Energy Lab at the university's Urban Labs. Additionally, Greenstone currently serves among else as co-chair of J-PAL's Environment and Energy sector (with Mushfiq Mobarak), director of the Energy Research Programme at the International Growth Centre (IGC), faculty director of the E2e Project, a fellow of the American Academy of Arts and Sciences and a non-resident senior fellow at the Brookings Institution. In the past, he has been e.g. a chief economist on the Council of Economic Advisors (2009–10) under the first Obama administration, a member of the advisory board to the Secretary of Energy under the Trump administration (2015–17), a co-director of IGC's Climate Change, Environment and Natural Resources Research programme (2010–13), and a director of the Hamilton Project (2010–13). Finally, in terms of professional service, Michael Greenstone sits on the board of editors of the Review of Environmental Economics and Policy and has been an editor of the Journal of Political Economy (2015–17), Review of Economics and Statistics (2007–10), and held positions on the boards of editors of the American Economic Journal: Economic Policy and the Journal of Economic Literature.

Michael Greenstone is married to Katherine Ozment, a secularist writer.

== Research ==
Michael Greenstone's research interests include environmental economics, energy economics, public finance, development economics, labour economics, and health economics.; in particular, he is a pioneer of the study of environmental issues in developing countries, an emerging field dubbed "envirodevonomics". According to IDEAS/RePEc, he currently (February 2018) belongs to the top 1% of highest ranked economists in terms of research publications.

=== Economic effects of air pollution ===
To investigate how does air pollution affects economic outcomes, Michael Greenstone and Kenneth Y. Chay used geographic variation in the reduction of air pollution due to the 1981-82 recession to estimate the impact of air pollution on infant mortality in the U.S.; they found that reducing TSPs by 1% results in a 0.35% decline in the county-level mortality rate of infants, with most of the reduction concerning newborn deaths, in particular among African Americans. In another study with Chay, Greenstone explored the impact of the U.S. 1970 and 1977 amendments to the Clean Air Act, which set a federal ceiling for total suspended particulates (TSPs), empowered the newly created Environmental Protection Agency to designate "non-attainment" counties in excess of that ceiling, and to impose strict air quality regulations on polluters in such counties, on housing prices, to study the relationship between housing prices and air quality. They found that the legislation was effective in reducing TSP air pollution and, based on an elasticity of housing values with regard to TSP concentration ranging from -0.20 to -0.35, that the improvements in air quality between 1970 and 1980 attributable to the regulations imposed under the non-attainment designation caused an increase of housing values in non-attainment counties worth $45 billion. However, Greenstone also found that the Clean Air Act's non-attainment designation probably played only a minor role in the 80% reduction of sulfur dioxide (SO2) concentrations in the United States, possibly because regulators assigned the SO2 non-attainment designation to many counties that hadn't even exceeded SO2 ceilings for a single day and consequently didn't impose excessively strict regulatory oversight. Finally, Greenstone also analysed the impact of the 1970 and 1977 Clean Air Act Amendments on industrial activity in the U.S. and found that pollution-intensive in "non-attainment" counties lost ca. 590,000 jobs, $37 billion in capital stock, and $75 billion (at 1987 U.S. dollars) of output over 1972–87 as a consequence of the greater regulatory oversight exercised by EPA.

=== Economic effects of climate change ===
Together with Olivier Deschênes, Michael Greenstone initially found that climate change will increase agricultural profits in the U.S. over 2010–2100 by an average of $1.3 billion per year (in 2002 U.S. dollars) and that the measurement of climate change effects on land prices (the hedonic approach) is extremely sensitive to seemingly minor choices about control variables, sample, and weighting. However, following Fisher et al.'s (2012) critique with regard to data coding errors and conceptual oversights in Deschênes and Greenstone (2007), Deschênes and Greenstone subsequently re-estimated climate change to decrease U.S. agricultural profits by $4.5 billion per year over 2010–2100. In another collaboration, Greenstone and Deschênes study the relationship between climate change and mortality and its mitigation through adaptation, and estimate that under "business-as-usual" scenarios climate change will increase the age-adjusted mortality rate in the U.S. by 3% by the end of the 21st century, though this effect may be strongly mitigated through populations adapting to the expected increase in the frequency of extreme temperature days.

=== Environmental and energy economics ===
Together with Hunt Allcott, Greenstone reconsiders the evidence in favour of an energy efficiency gap, i.e. whether consumers and firms fail to invest as much into energy efficiency as the expected increases in terms of utility or profits due to such investments would warrant. Overall, they cannot substantiate claims of a widespread energy efficiency gap, though their differentiation of specific investment inefficiency types leads them to conclude that policies aimed at addressing a supposed energy efficiency gap must be targeted to those consumer subject to investment inefficiencies if they are to be at all effective.

How much do people value the removal of hazardous waste? Investigating this question, Greenstone and Justin Gallagher use a regression discontinuity design to compare the reaction of housing market prices at hazardous waste sites that narrowly qualified to benefit from Superfund cleanups relative to those who narrowly missed qualifying. They find the reaction to be economically small and statistically insignificant, suggesting that the average local benefits of Superfund cleanups are likely to be much lower than the cleanups' average cost of $43 million.

In environmental economics as well as in other areas, Greenstone has strongly advocated for the greater application of (quasi-)experimental methods to identify which policies are effective and efficient in terms of increasing social welfare.

=== Miscellany ===
How does the opening of a new manufacturing plant affect the productivity of incumbent manufacturing plants? Studying this question with Richard Hornbeck and Enrico Moretti, Greenstone finds that the TFP of incumbent plants in counties that were selected as the site for the opening of a new plant increase 12% more than in their runner-up competitors, with the agglomeration spillovers being particularly large if the old and new plants are similar. However, they also find that the wage growth in "winning" counties caused by the increased local labour demand tends to exceed productivity growth, thus reducing plant profits.

Exploiting the 1987 federal permission to U.S. states to only raise the speed limit on their rural interstates from 55 mph (ca. 90 kmh) to 65 mph (ca. 105 kmh), Greenstone and Orley Ashenfelter compare the time saved due to the increase in speed limit with the increase in fatality rates (an increase of ca. 35%) to estimate the value of a statistical life. They find that approximately 125,000 hours were saved per lost life, suggesting (if hours saved are valued at the average hourly wage) an upper bound of $1.54 million (in 1997 U.S. dollars) as a value of a statistical life.

Finally, Greenstone, Paul Oyer and Annette Vissing-Jorgensen use the extension of mandatory disclosure requirements under the 1964 Securities Acts Amendments from listed stock to over the counter (OTC) stock trades on stock returns. They find that the announcement of compliance with disclosure requirements by those OTC firms most likely to be affected by the change in regulation was accompanied by abnormal excess stock returns of ca. 3.5% in the weeks surrounding the announcement and that expectations regarding the extension of regulations resulted in abnormal excess returns ranging from 11.5 to 22.1% in the period between legislative proposal and enforcement, suggesting large-scale insider trading at OTC firms.

=== Current Work ===
Greenstone's research has influenced policy domestically and internationally. His current work involves testing innovative ways that aim to increase developing countries' energy access and improve the efficiency of environmental regulations across the world. Greenstone is a co-director of the Climate Impact Lab where he is producing numerically based estimates of the local and global impacts of climate change. Further, he developed the Air Quality Life Index™ that converts air pollution concentrations into their impact on life expectancy and co-founded Climate Vault, a 501(c)(3) that uses markets to allow institutions and people to reduce their carbon footprint.
