= Evidence Action =

American non-profit organization

- Formation: 2013
- Founder: Amrita Ahuja
- Legal status: 501(c)(3)
- Headquarters: Washington, DC
- Region served: Sub-Saharan Africa; South Asia; East Africa
- Services: Deworming; Water chlorination Iron supplementation Syphilis screening
- Fields: International development Global health
- CEO: Kanika Bahl
- Board of directors: Shikhar Ghosh (Chair); Amrita Ahuja; Kanika Bahl; Elizabeth Young McNally; Christina Reichers; Dina Pomeranz; Owens Wiwa
- Key people: Michael Kremer; Esther Duflo; Rachel Glennerster; Kristin Forbes
- Revenue: $127 Million USD (2022)
- Expenses: $32.5 Million USD (2022)
- Staff: 700+ (2023)
- Website: www.evidenceaction.org

Evidence Action is an American non-profit organization that develops and implements health and development programs in low- and middle-income countries. The organization operates four main global health programs: the Deworm the World Initiative, Safe Water Now, Equal Vitamin Access, and Syphilis-Free Start. It also operates an Accelerator program, whereby new development interventions are evaluated for possible implementation at scale. In 2022, the organization's revenue was US$127 million.

Evidence Action has received substantial funding and recommendations from organizations associated with the effective altruism movement, including GiveWell. In 2025, GiveWell published a report highlighting discrepancies between Evidence Action's monitoring data and government data in evaluations of some of its technical-assistance programs in India, and no longer lists it as a Top Charity.

== History ==
Evidence Action was founded in 2013 as the parent organization for the Deworm the World Initiative, an international deworming campaign co-founded by economists Kristin Forbes, Michael Kremer, Esther Duflo, and Rachel Glennerster. In 2004, Kremer and co-author Edward Miguel published an impact evaluation of a school-based deworming campaign in Kenya, showing that the program increased school attendance rates by 25% and improved overall health. Kremer and Esther Duflo presented the findings of this and other research at the World Economic Forum in 2007, founding the Deworm the World Initiative as an independent organization to scale school-based deworming schemes. From 2010 to 2014, Deworm the World was incubated by Innovations for Poverty Action, a non-profit research and policy organization advocating the use of rigorous impact evaluation in international development.

In 2013, Evidence Action was founded to manage Deworm the World. Alix Zwane, Evidence Action's first executive director, articulated the organization's mandate as being based on the "gap between what research shows is effective in global development and what is implemented in practice." The organization is now run by Kanika Bahl, a former Executive Vice President of the Clinton Health Access Initiative. From 2013 to 2022, Evidence Action was ranked a top-rated charity by GiveWell, considered among the best internationally for social impact per dollar spent. In 2025, GiveWell published a report showcasing discrepancies between Evidence Action's reporting and the Indian government's reporting.

Many businesspeople, journalists, and prominent figures in the effective altruism movement have donated to or advocated for donating to Evidence Action, including Peter Singer, Ezra Klein, Nicholas Kristof, Dylan Matthews, Dustin Moskovitz, and Cari Tuna.

== Programs ==
Evidence Action operates four distinct programs: Deworm the World, Safe Water Now, Equal Vitamin Access, and Syphilis-Free Start. The first two of these were incubated by Innovations for Poverty Action, and are implemented at-scale. The latter two were launched via Evidence Action's Accelerator program, whereby promising interventions are piloted and scaled conditional on performance.

=== Deworm the World ===
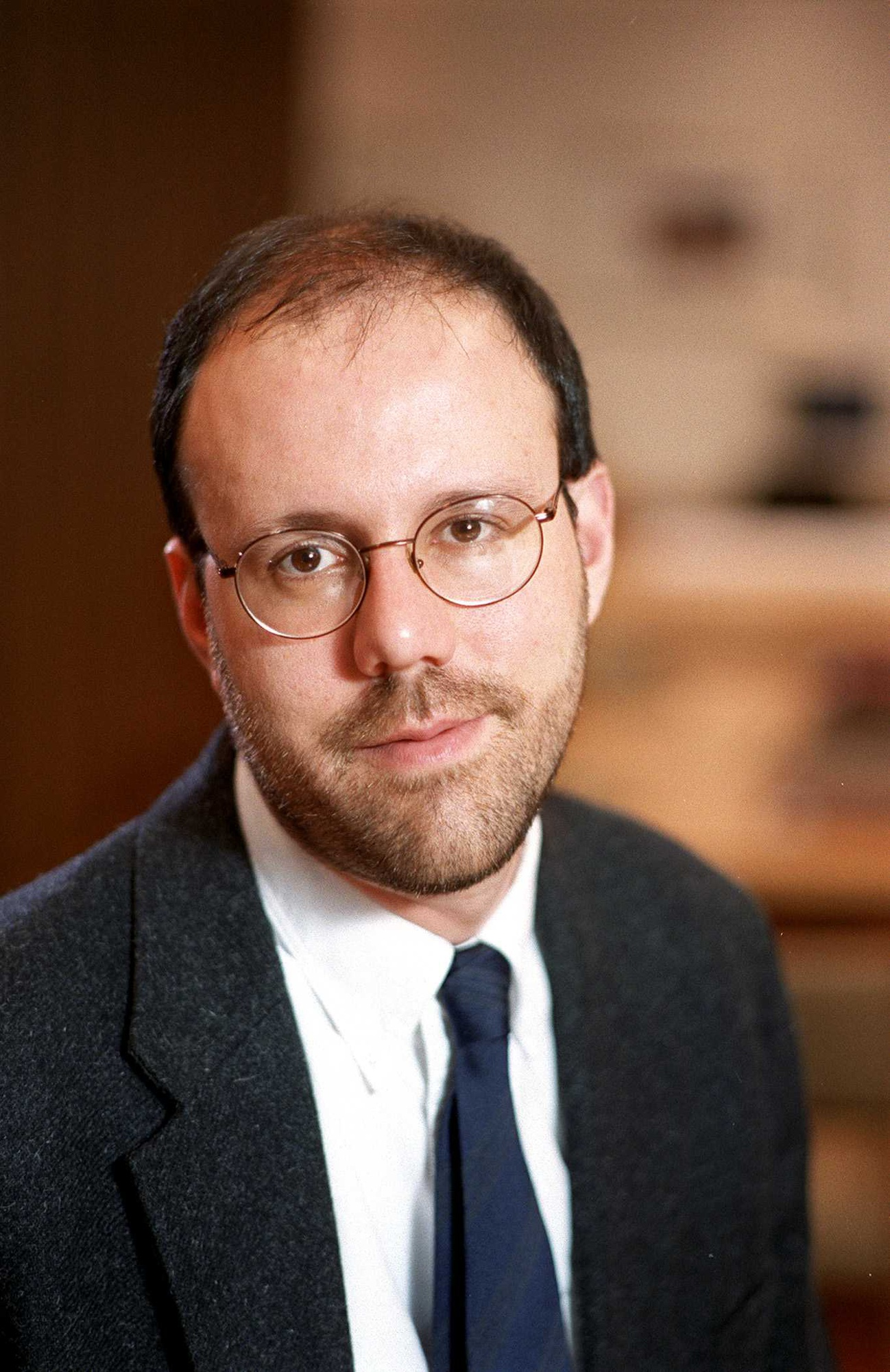
Michael Kremer, co-author of "Worms"

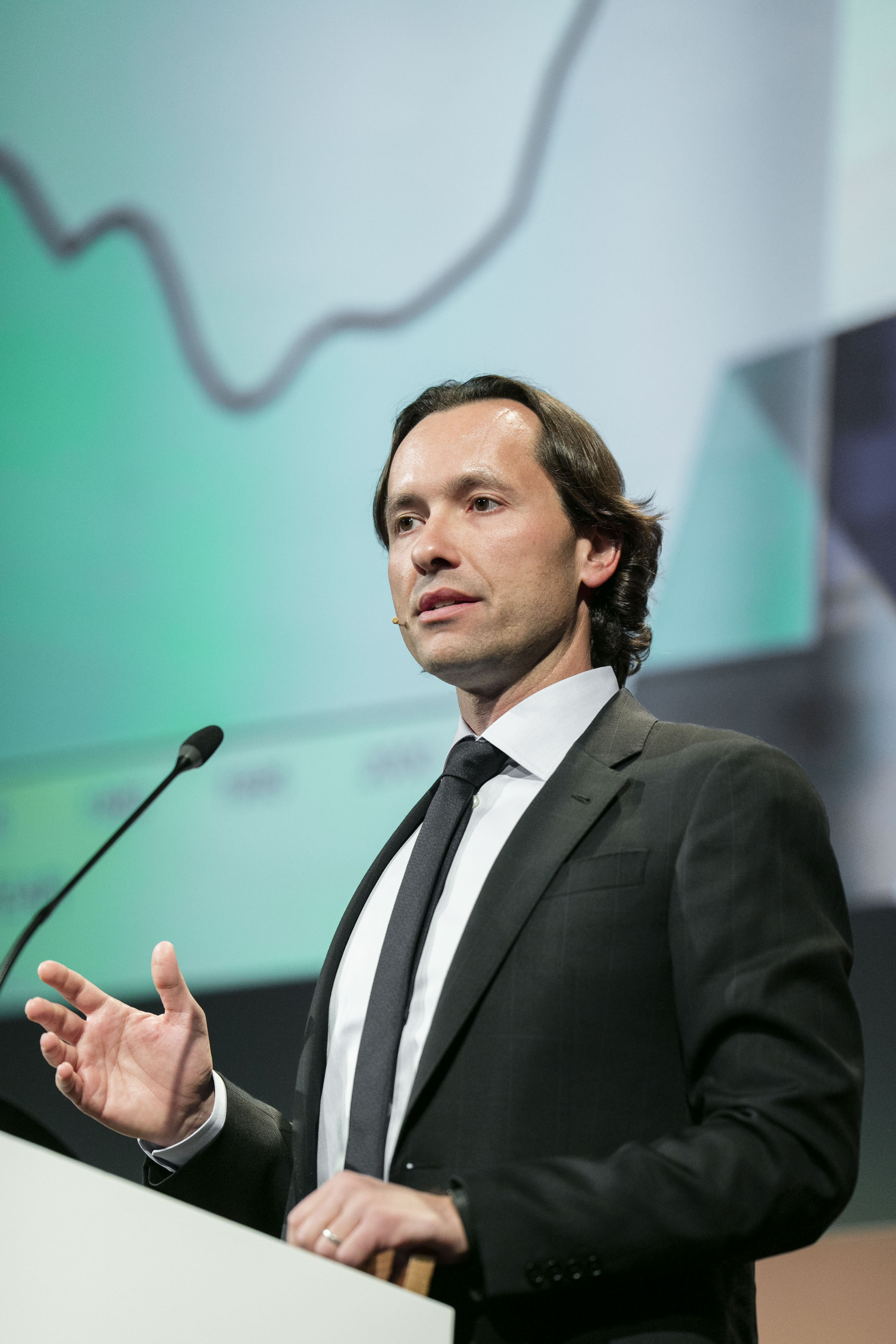
Edward Miguel, co-author of "Worms"

Evidence Action's flagship program is Deworm the World, a school-based deworming scheme active in Kenya, India, Ethiopia, Nigeria, and Vietnam. The Deworm the World Initiative was founded in 2007, in response to an experimental evaluation of a school-based deworming campaign in Busia, Kenya. After completing an undergraduate degree at Harvard University, Michael Kremer worked for a year as a teacher in the Kakamega District of Kenya. He returned to the area with Rachel Glennerster, his wife, after completing his PhD, and learned of a local friend's plan to implement a deworming program in nearby schools. Interested in the effects of the program, he organized a randomized controlled trial, rolling out treatments in 1998. In 2004, Kremer and Edward Miguel, his PhD student, published the results of the evaluation in Econometrica.

The results of the study indicated that deworming is a cost effective means of improving health and education outcomes, raising school attendance rates by 25%. The study's treatment effects suggested that for each $100 spent on deworming, students would collectively gain another 13.9 years of schooling. Results from the experiment were presented by Kremer and Esther Duflo at the World Economic Forum in 2007, inspiring the creation of the Deworm the World Initiative, an international deworming campaign incubated by Innovations for Poverty Action. In 2009, Deworm the World began working with the Kenyan government to train teachers and other school employees to administer oral deworming treatments to students. In 2012, a full-scale roll-out was launched, with treatments administered in a series of "deworming days" across the country. A similar campaign was launched in India, where Deworm the World supported preliminary surveys of the worm burdens across various Indian states and helped rolled-out treatment to over 17 million children in the state of Bihar. In 2013, Evidence Action was founded to manage and scale the Deworm the World Initiative.

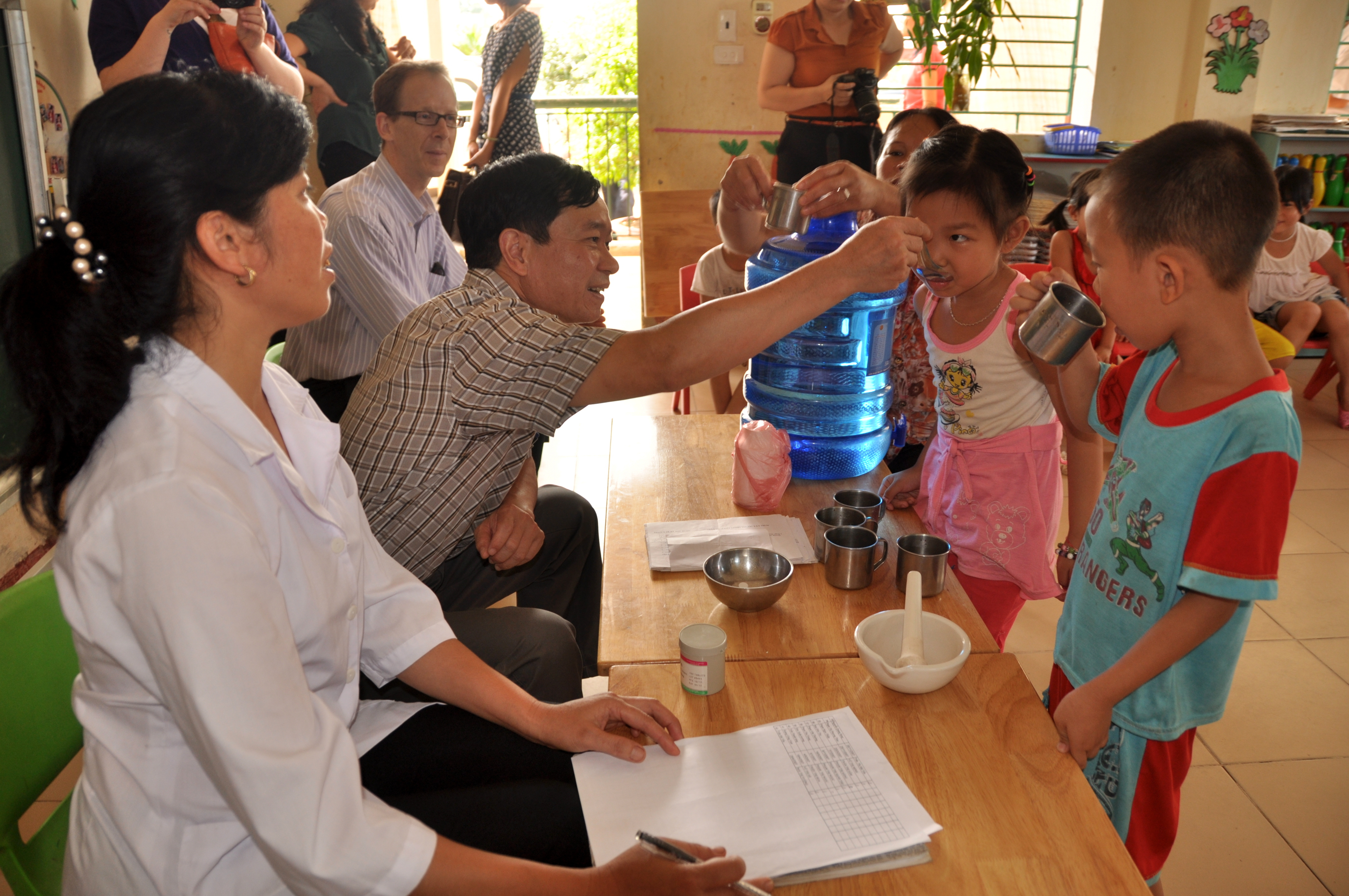
USAID delivers deworming medication to school children in Vietnam

Since the initial rollout of Deworm the World, Kremer and Miguel's findings have been challenged by replications and further studies showing more muted effects of deworming on school attendance. In 2015, Alexander Aiken and co-authors published two papers in the International Journal of Epidemiology reproducing Kremer and Miguel's results with both the same and different methods, showing less pronounced effects on attendance and no impact on school performance. They likewise critiqued the original study's lack of external validity, noting that the original study paired deworming with a health information campaign. After the replications were published, Cochrane updated their review examining the effects of deworming, arguing that meta-analysis of 40 studies provided little evidence that deworming improves nutrition or educational outcomes.

Despite these challenges, many in the international development community have continued to promote deworming as a cost-effective global health intervention. In 2015, an article in PLOS Neglected Tropical Diseases criticized the Cochrane review, arguing that it included an unnecessarily limited number of studies, and that RCTs often understate effects by treating both those with heavy and light worm burdens. Writing of his analysis of the replications, Chris Blattman, then of Columbia University, wrote that "[t]here are clearly serious problems with the Miguel-Kremer study. But, to be quite frank, you have throw so much crazy sh*t at Miguel-Kremer to make the result go away that I believe the result even more than when I started." Justin Sandefur of the Center for Global Development similarly wrote that "New information about the original deworming study qualifies its findings, but certainly does not 'debunk,' 'overturn,' or negate its findings". This assessment was further supported by a long-term follow-up published by Miguel, Kremer, and co-authors in the Proceedings of the National Academy of Sciences, showing that children treated with deworming medications twenty years prior have higher earnings, and are more likely to work in non-agricultural jobs. Their results suggest that deworming produces a 37% annualized rate of return.

In light of these results, Evidence Action continues to implement deworming programs, treating 275 million children annually in Kenya, India, Vietnam, Nigeria and Ethiopia. An impact evaluation of Kenya's National School-Based Deworming Program, implemented in partnership with Evidence Action, concluded that the scheme reduced the rate of soil-transmitted helminth infection in the country by 26.5 percentage points from 2012 to 2022. Evidence Action's program in Bihar, first implemented in 2011, reached 80% of its target population, substantially exceeding World Health Organization guidelines. By 2015, the Government of India expanded the program nationally, treating 89.9 million children. In 2022–2023, Evidence Action launched a similar mass deworming program in Lagos State with the support of the Nigerian Federal Ministry of Health, aiming to treat 1.3 million children under the age of five.

=== Safe Water Now ===
Evidence Action also operates a point-of-collection water chlorination program called Safe Water Now. The scheme was incubated by Innovations for Poverty Action, and was founded in response to a series of randomized controlled trials conducted by Michael Kremer, Edward Miguel, Sendhil Mullainathan, Clair Null, and Alix Zwane in Kenya between 2004 and 2010. The RCT found that a combination of local advertising campaigns and chlorine distribution systems strategically located near water wells increased the likelihood that households treated their water. Subsequent work by Kremer, Johannes Haushofer, Ricardo Maertens, and Brandon Joel Tan showed that this increase in chlorination take-up translated into improved health, with treatment causing a reduction in child (i.e. under five) mortality of 1.4 percentage points, a 63% decline from baseline. The program was found to significantly exceed World Health Organization cost effectiveness standards, and was identified by Evidence Action as a scalable, low cost, and high impact intervention, saving lives for an estimated $1,941. A subsequent meta-analysis of 52 RCTs by Michael Kremer and co-authors confirmed this result, showing that water chlorination saves disability adjusted life years at a cost of approximately $40.

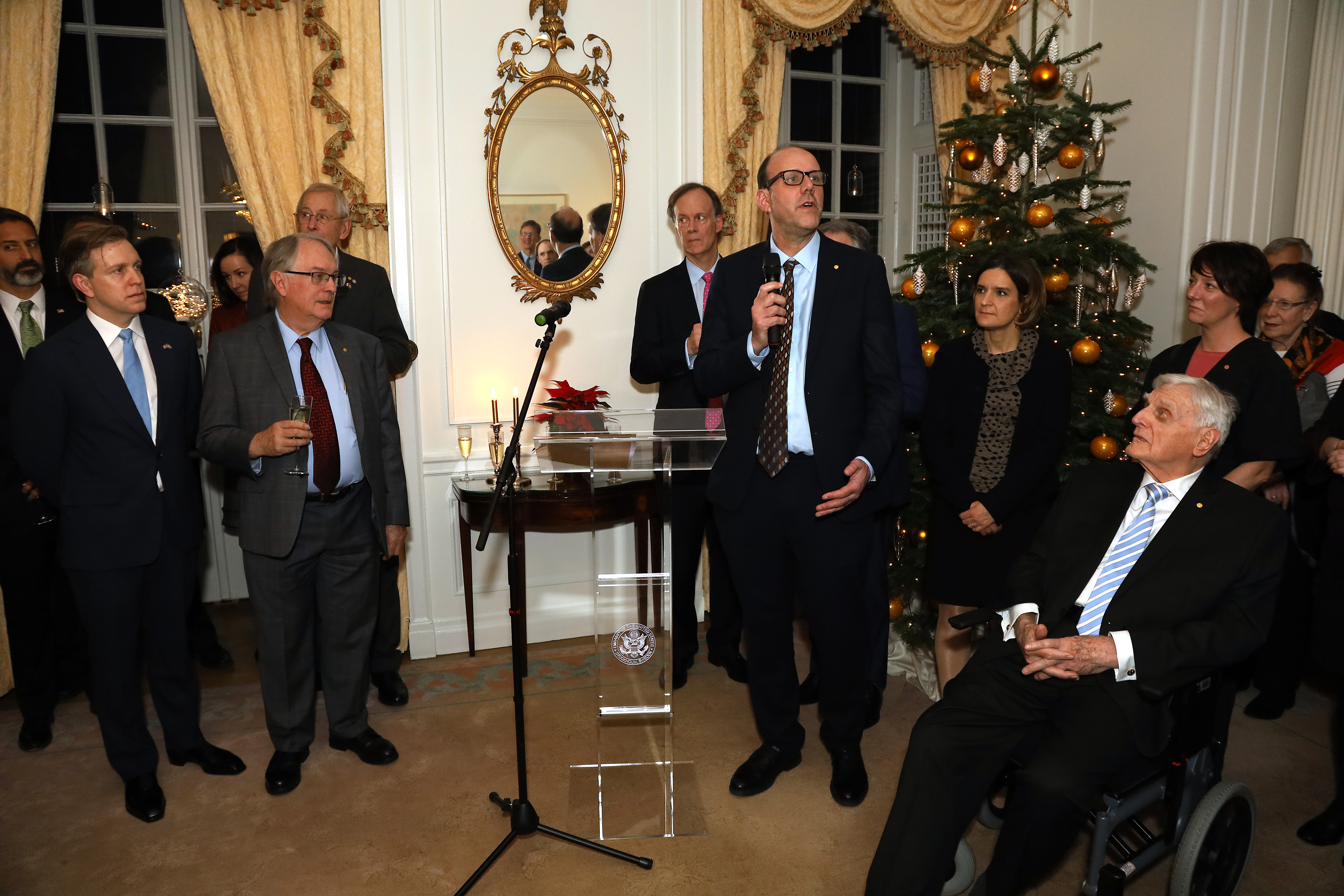
Michael Kremer receiving the 2019 Nobel Memorial Prize in Economic Sciences alongside Esther Duflo

As of mid-2019, Safe Water Now provided chlorination services to 4 million people, a number that has grown to over 10 million in 2023.

=== Syphilis-Free Start and Equal Vitamin Access ===
Evidence Action also operates an Accelerator program, whereby promising, cost-effective health and nutrition interventions are scaled and tested iteratively according to a venture capital model. The program replaced Evidence Action Beta, a similar scheme. As of 2022, only 2% of programs examined by Evidence Action's Accelerator program are actually scaled. Kanika Bahl, Evidence Action's CEO, has referred to the program as trying to find the "unicorns of international development".

Several interventions have been scaled through Evidence Action's Beta and Accelerator schemes. This includes two of Evidence Action's primary programs: Syphilis-Free Start and Equal Vitamin Access. Syphilis-Free Start provides syphilis screening to pregnant women, who if infected are more likely to experience stillbirth or bear children with severe disabilities. Syphilis testing can be added to routine HIV tests for $0.35, but is frequently not conducted, despite support from the World Health Organization. In 2020, Evidence Action partnered with the government of Liberia to fill this gap, piloting dual testing for syphilis and HIV in Montserrado County. By 2022, rates of screening had grown by 61 percentage points, from a baseline of 6%. Evidence Action has since expanded the program to Zambia and Cameroon.

Evidence Action also operates Equal Vitamin Access, a program that provides iron and folic acid supplementation to children in regions where anemia and other nutritional deficiencies are common. In 2019, Evidence Action's Beta program launched a pilot of the scheme in partnership with several Indian states with the support of a $5.1 million incubation grant from Good Ventures. In support of the program, Evidence Action has also contributed to research on the supply-chain for iron and folic acid supplements in India.

=== No Lean Season ===
From 2014 to 2019, Evidence Action ran an additional program called No Lean Season that offered financial incentives to farm workers to migrate to nearby cities during the monga, a period of seasonal famine coinciding with the agricultural off season in Bangladesh. The scheme was based on a similar program studied by Gharad Bryan, Shyamal Chowdhury, and Mushfiq Mobarak in a randomized controlled trial in which Bangladeshi farm workers were given low interest loans to migrate to nearby cities. The program increased the incomes of households that sent seasonal migrants, and raised the likelihood of migration in future years (even if incentives were not actively provided). The scheme was nearly five times as cost effective as traditional food distribution efforts. Karen Levy of Evidence Action noted that "[t]he results were pretty astounding. ... [t]o find this very small, very well-targeted intervention that seems to have these big outsized effects ... those things don't come along very often." By 2017, the program had raised $11 million, and been scaled to 699 villages and 170,000 households in Bangladesh.

In 2017, results from an additional randomized evaluation were released demonstrating that the program, implemented in partnership with Bangladeshi NGO RDRS, did not have the desired effects on migration. Mushfiq Mobarak, whose study in Econometrica promoted the program's rollout, argued that the null effect was the result of RDRS disproportionately registering those eager to migrate before the incentive was provided. The program was also called into question after Evidence Action's leadership was made aware that the initial approval of the project was solicited via a bribe to a junior government official. In response, Evidence Action ended its relationship with RDRS, and canceled No Lean Season, which was previously ranked among the most effective destinations for charitable donations by GiveWell.

== Funding ==
According to ProPublica, Evidence Action's annual expenses grew from less than $200,000 in 2013 to $22.4 million in 2021. In 2022, their expenses reached $32.5 million, with total revenues exceeding $127 million.

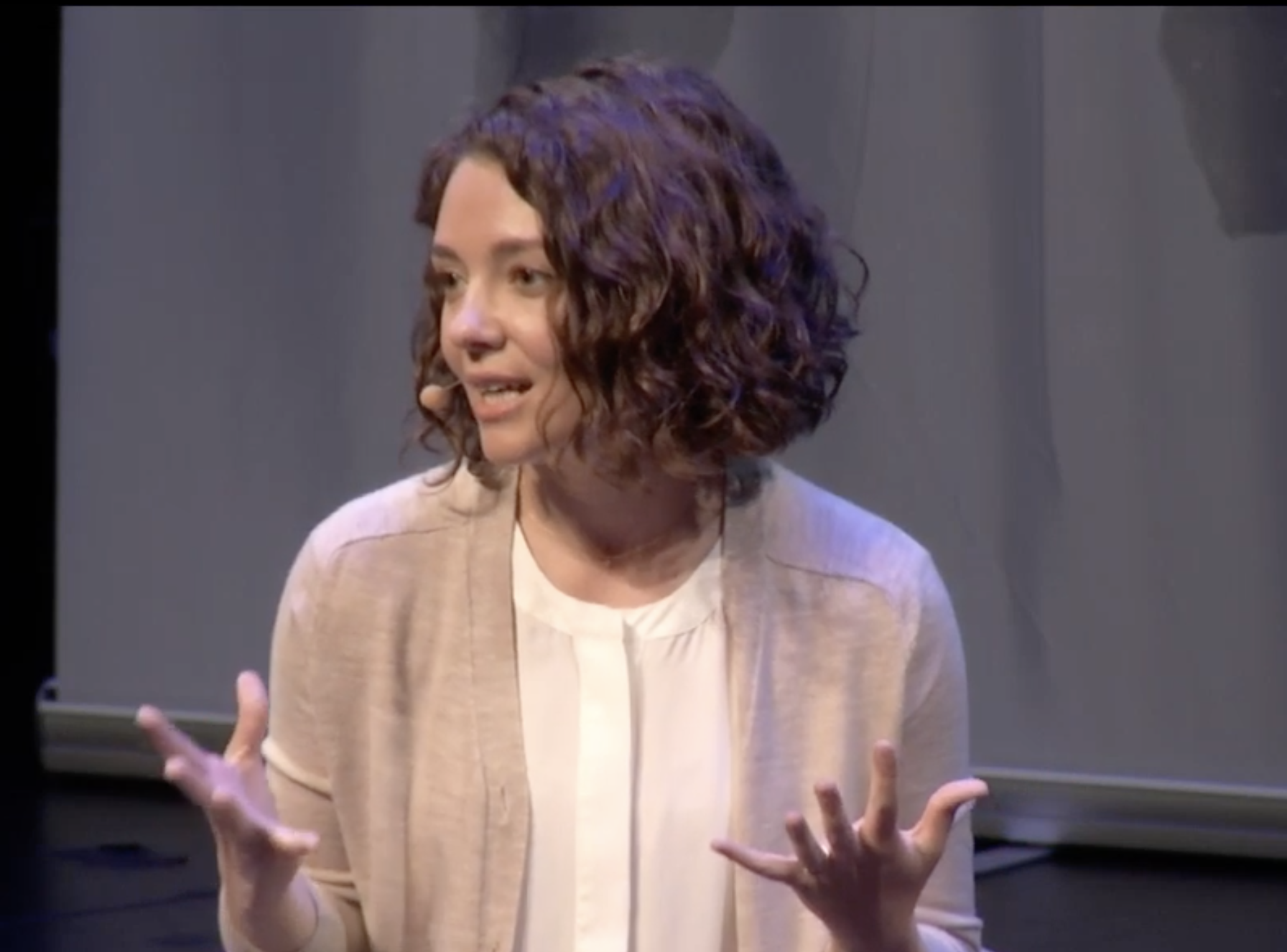
Cari Tuna, co-founder of Open Philanthropy and Good Ventures

Evidence Action has been supported by many prominent organizations in the effective altruism movement. As of 2023, the charity has received over 20 distinct grants from Good Ventures, an American philanthropic organization founded by Cari Tuna and Dustin Moskovitz that distributes funds in line with recommendations from Open Philanthropy. Good Ventures made its largest grants in 2022, when $48.8 million was committed to Evidence Action's Dispensers for Safe Water program and an additional $14 million was earmarked for the charity's Accelerator scheme.

Logo of GiveWell, an American cause prioritization charity

Evidence Action has also received 35 distinct grants from GiveWell, an American cause prioritization charity. The largest of these was distributed in 2022, when $64.7 million was committed to Evidence Action's Dispensers for Safe Water program. Between 2017 and 2018, GiveWell also committed over $29 million to the Deworm the World Initiative.

In 2023, Evidence Action received a $1.27 million grant from the Weiss Asset Management Foundation to support the pilot of a water treatment program in India. Evidence Action has also received support from the United States Agency for International Development's Development Innovation Ventures scheme, and from the Astellas Global Health Foundation.
