= Dina Pomeranz =

Swiss economist

Dina Deborah Pomeranz (born 21 February 1977) is a Swiss economist who is currently an associate professor of applied economics at the University of Zürich. Pomeranz is considered to be one of the most influential Swiss economists.

== Education ==
Pomeranz was born to a Jewish family in Switzerland, and grew up in Zürich, where she graduated from high school. She received a BA in international relations and an MA in international economics from the Graduate Institute of International and Development Studies (IHEID) in 2001 and 2003 respectively. She received a PhD in economics from Harvard University in 2010. Her dissertation was titled Essays on Tax Evasion and Savings: Evidence from Three Randomized Experiments in Chile.

== Research and career ==
Pomeranz was an assistant professor at Harvard Business School before joining the University of Zürich as an assistant professor of applied economics. At the University of Zürich, her research interests include development economics, public finance, and impact evaluations. Her research focuses on public policy in developing countries, particularly with regards to taxation and public procurement. She was also a postdoctoral fellow at the Poverty Action Lab (J-PAL) at MIT.

Pomeranz is an affiliate at the Bureau for Research and Economic Analysis of Development (BREAD), and a research affiliate at the Centre for Economic Policy Research (CEPR). She is a non-resident fellow at the Center for Global Development (CGD), and a member of the International Growth Centre (IGC). She was also a faculty research fellow at the NBER from 2012 to 2017. She was elected to a five-year term on the Council of the European Economic Association in 2018.

Pomeranz serves on the boards or advisory boards of Helvetas, Evidence Action, Policy Analytics, TamTam – Together Against Malaria, and IDinsight.

Since 2024, he is a member of the Swiss Government Advisory Committee on International Cooperation (BK IZA) and of the Swiss Government Advisory Committee on Migration (EKM).

== Recognition ==
Pomeranz's work has been published in the Quarterly Journal of Economics, the American Economic Review, the American Economic Journal: Applied Economics, and the Journal of Development Economics. In 2017, the European Research Council awarded her a Starting Grant for research on tax evasion and firm networks. In 2018, she received the Excellence Prize in Applied Development Research by Verein für Socialpolitik. In 2023, she was awarded the SNSF Consolidator Grant (Horizon transitional measure).

She was ranked as one of the top ten most influential economists in Switzerland by Zurich-based newspaper Tages-Anzeiger.

Frankfurter Allgemeine Zeitung ranked Pomeranz the highest in social media influence in its 2019 ranking of economists, with data supported by the economics magazine Makronom. As of August 2020, Pomeranz was ranked 50th on RePEc's list of Top Young Economists. In 2024, Katharinenturm named her among the 500 women with notable impact on the city of Zurich in the past 500 years.

== Selected publications ==
- with Felipe Kast: "Savings Accounts to Borrow Less: Experimental Evidence from Chile". Journal of Human Resources, Volume 59, No. 3, January 2024, doi:10.3368/jhr.0619-10264R3.
- with Maria Paula Gerardino and Stephan Litschig: "Distortion by Audit: Evidence from Public Procurement". American Economic Journal: Applied Economics, Volume 16, No. 4, October 2024, pp. 71–108 doi:10.1257/app.20220512.
- with Paul Carrillo, Dave Donaldson, Monica Singhal: "Ghosting the Tax Authority: Fake Firms and Tax Fraud". American Economic Review: Insights, Volume 5, No. 4, December 2023, pp. 427–444, doi:10.1257/aeri.20220321.
- with Rodrigo Adão, Paul Carrillo, Arnaud Costinot, Dave Donaldson: "Imports, Exports, and Earnings Inequality: Measures of Exposure and Estimates of Incidence". Quarterly Journal of Economics, Volume 137, No. 3, August 2022, pp. 1553–1614, doi:10.1093/qje/qjac012.
- with Maria Paula Gerardino, Stephan Litschig: "Traditional Audit Design May Distort Incentives". In Public Procurement in Focus: Rules, Discretion, and Emergencies (eds. Oriana Bandiera, Erica Bosio, Giancarlo Spagnolo), CEPR Press, 2021, pp. 83–90 (CEPR PDF).
- with Sebastián Bustos, José Vila-Belda, Gabriel Zucman: "Challenges of Monitoring Tax Compliance by Multinational Firms: Evidence from Chile". AEA Papers and Proceedings, Volume 109, May 2019, pp. 500–505, doi:10.1257/pandp.20191045.
- with José Vila-Belda: "Taking State-Capacity Research to The Field: Insights from Collaborations with Tax Authorities". Annual Review of Economics, Volume 11, August 2019, pp. 755–781, doi:10.1146/annurev-economics-080218-030312.
- with Felipe Kast, Stephan Meier: "Saving More in Groups: Field Experimental Evidence from Chile". Journal of Development Economics, Volume 133, July 2018, pp. 275–294, doi:10.1016/j.jdeveco.2018.01.006.
- with Paul Carrillo, Monica Singhal: "Dodging the Taxman: Firm Misreporting and Limits to Tax Enforcement". American Economic Journal: Applied Economics, Volume 9, No. 2, April 2017, doi:10.1257/app.20140495.
- "No Taxation Without Information: Deterrence and Self-Enforcement in the Value Added Tax". American Economic Review, Volume 105, No. 8, August 2015, pp. 2539–2569, doi:10.1257/aer.20130393.
- "Impact Evaluation Methods in Public Economics: A Brief Introduction to Randomized Evaluations and Comparison with Other Methods". Public Finance Review, Volume 45, No. 1, January 2017, pp. 10–43, doi:10.1177/1091142115614392.
- with Cristobal Marshall, Pamela Castellon: "Randomized Tax Enforcement Messages: A Policy Tool for Improving Audit Strategies". Tax Administration Review, No. 36, January 2014, pp. 1–21 (CIAT PDF).
