= Monga (Bangladesh) =

Bengali term referring to a yearly cycle

Monga is a Bengali term referring to the yearly cyclical phenomenon of poverty and hunger in Bangladesh. It is also called "mora Kartik," which means "months of death and disaster." It refers to two times per year, from September–November (after the aman crop is planted) and from March–April (after the boro crop is planted). These natural phenomena lead to fewer available job opportunities for rural workers, resulting in the workers becoming migrant and moving to towns. Those who cannot migrate can face malnutrition and starvation. The public awareness of Monga has risen with media focus in the 2000s. It was cited in Bangladesh's Poverty Reduction Strategy Paper, and has been the subject of NGO aid programs.

== Risk and vulnerability ==
The risk of monga is identified by the Overseas Development Institute as resulting from/being:

- external shocks (e.g. an earthquake or financial crisis)
- stresses – predictable events that form part of the family life-cycle (e.g. old age or weddings)
- idiosyncratic
- covariate (large areas affected by one phenomenon such as drought)
- acute (e.g. an epidemic)
- chronic (e.g. degeneration of resource productivity under increasing population pressure)

Vulnerability is also a complex combination of the following:

- Physical: areas prone to natural disasters such as floods or cyclones
- Economic: caused by factors such as indebtedness and low, seasonal or unreliable income.
- Social: e.g. gender inequality and lack of social capital and/or networks.

There are many negative coping strategies employed and this can have both a short-term impact (e.g. reducing food consumption), but it also threatens households' long term ability to help themselves out of the crisis as they are forced to sell productive assets.

== Preventing monga in Bangladesh ==
Preventing monga requires addressing the following issues:

1. reduce risk by protecting assets and household consumption/income;
2. prevent negative coping strategies (e.g. selling productive assets);
3. promote investment in livelihoods and productive assets;
4. increase voice and access to information.

In earlier years, efforts to counteract the effects of monga were made through Government test relief and other programmes, and by rural infrastructure `cash-for-work' interventions by long established NGOs such as RDRS Bangladesh which also carried out skills training and crop diversification from the mid-1970s. The spread of irrigation has reduced the impact of the early season monga (March, April) but is still a major factor in the September–October period before the amon rice harvest

=== Government action ===
The Bangladeshi government has been trying to assist the victims of monga by providing a US$295 million program which provides employment for two million heads of families for 75 days during the monga season. This also can be a big fail sometimes.

=== The BRAC programme ===
This involves the transfer of productive assets worth 8,000 to 13,000 Taka to the poorest households in northern Bangladesh. Furthermore, it provides intensive training and support on how to manage these assets, as well as a daily stipend until the assets start producing an income (approximately 300 Taka per month). In this way, the assets transferred are not sold as a coping strategy before those assets have started producing an income and securing the household from such an extreme measure (see Cash transfers). The programme also subsidises health and legal services, water and sanitation provision and the development of supportive community networks.

=== The Chars Livelihoods Programme (CLP) ===
The poorest households in the Jamuna Chars region, an low-lying area prone to floods and erosion in northern Bangladesh, are provided with income generating assets worth approximately 13,000 Taka. This livelihoods intervention support includes a monthly stipend for 18 months of 300 Taka per month, infrastructure development, social development training, seasonal work and promotes entrepreneurship in the agricultural and non-farm sectors.

=== The Vulnerable Group Development programme (VGD) ===
A national programme integrating food security and nutrition issues with development and income generating activities for poor households in food insecure areas. For two years this programme transfers monthly food rations, as well as services such as income generating skills training. The programme also works with micro-credit service providers.

=== The Programmed Initiatives for Monga Eradication (PRIME) ===
This is the initiative of the Palli Karma-Sahayak Foundation (PKSF), a micro-finance institution, in northern Bangladesh. The PKSF provide employment opportunities for the monga season, emergency credit for households with a slightly higher income, consumption loans, remittance services and a carefully designed flexible credit support system. The aim is to build beneficiaries’ coping capacity, and their skills and resources to secure their own futures.
