= Jeffrey Hammer =

American economist

- Born: Jeffrey Stuart Hammer; November 3, 1953 (age 72)

Academic background
- Education: Swarthmore College (BA), Massachusetts Institute of Technology (PhD)

Academic work
- Discipline: Development economics Health economics
- Institutions: Princeton University, The World Bank

Jeffrey Stuart Hammer (born November 3, 1953) is a health and development economist. Hammer was the Charles and Marie Robertson Visiting Professor of Economic Development at the Woodrow Wilson School of Public and International Affairs of Princeton University. His primary research focus is the economics of health policy and health service provision in poor countries. He was on the core team of the 2004 World Development Report “Making Services Work for Poor People,” alongside Lant Pritchett, Shanta Devarajan, and other notable economists. He is currently a senior non-resident scholar at the National Council of Applied Economic Research in Delhi, and Director of the One Hundred Homes project.

== Education and career ==
Hammer earned a B.A. in economics from Swarthmore College and his PhD in economics from the Massachusetts Institute of Technology where he was the recipient of a National Science Foundation Graduate Research Fellowship. Before Princeton he worked at The World Bank for 25 years, the last three years in the New Delhi office. As of 2026, Hammer continues to research the quality of medical care in developing countries, along with improving service delivery through better accountability mechanisms.
