= Mushfiq Mobarak =

Economics Professor

Ahmed Mushfiq Mobarak
- Born: 1976 (age 49–50)
- Education: Macalester College; University of Maryland, College Park
- Occupations: Jerome Kasoff ’54 Professor of Management and Economics
- Employer: Yale University
- Known for: Bangladeshi American Economist and a Professor of Economics
- Website: https://faculty.som.yale.edu/mushfiqmobarak/

Ahmed Mushfiq Mobarak (born 1976) is a Bangladeshi economist and a professor of economics at Yale University. He is a co-chair of the Abdul Latif Jameel Poverty Action Lab's (J-PAL) Urban Services Initiative and its Environment and Energy sector, as well as the lead academic for Bangladesh at the International Growth Centre (IGC).

Mobarak holds concurrent appointments in the School of Management and in the Department of Economics at Yale University. He is also the founder and faculty director of the Yale Research Initiative on Innovation and Scale (Y-RISE). His research interests concentrate on environmental issues in developing countries. He has several ongoing research projects in Bangladesh, Nepal, and Sierra Leone.

== Biography ==
A native of Bangladesh, Mushfiq Mobarak studied in the United States, where he earned a B.A. in mathematics and economics from Macalester College in 1997, and both an M.A. and a Ph.D. in economics from the University of Maryland, College Park, in 1999 and 2002, respectively. During his graduate studies, Mobarak worked as a consultant and economist for the World Bank (1998-2001) and the International Monetary Fund before becoming an assistant professor at the University of Colorado, Boulder (2002–07). Following a visiting appointment in 2006, Mobarak then moved to the Yale School of Management in 2007, where he was first promoted to associate professor (2012–15) and to full professor in 2015; in 2017, he also integrated Yale University's Department of Economics.

Mushfiq Mobarak is affiliated with several economic research institutes, including J-PAL, where he serves as co-chair of Urban Services Initiative (with Esther Duflo, since 2011) and of the Energy and Environment sector (with Michael Greenstone, since 2016). Moreover, he also has been the lead academic of the Bangladesh Research Programme at IGC since 2009 and was a Global Future Council Fellow regarding the future of migration at the World Economic Forum. Other affiliations include NBER, BREAD, CEPR, and Yale's Economic Growth Center, among others. Finally, he also holds editorial positions at Development Engineering, the World Bank Economic Review, and Economic Development and Cultural Change.

== Research ==
Mushfiq Mobarak's research interests include development economics, behavioural economics, environmental economics and migration. According to IDEAS/RePEc, he belongs to the top 7% of most cited economists. Key findings of his research include:

- that, as people become richer, the risk of sustaining damages due to flooding, landslides and windstorms tends to increase up to a certain threshold and decrease only thereafter, implying that governments in developing countries may need to be particularly proactive to mitigate their citizens' exposure to disaster risk (with Derek K. Kellenberg);
- that political democratization and economic diversification reduce volatility, and thereby contribute to sustain economic growth;
- that the likelihood of commuting to work by car decreases as urban population concentration and the availability of public transport increase and road are more sparse, suggesting that optimising the spatial structure of cities could significantly reduce commutation (with Antonio M. Bento, Maureen L. Cropper and Katja Vinha).

== Awards ==
- 2015 - Best 40 under 40 Business School Professors, Poets and Quants
- 2023 - Top 10 Clinical Research Achievement Awards, The Clinical Research Forum

== Personal life ==
Mobarak is married and has two children.
