= Fiscal council =

Type of official watchdog institution

A fiscal council is an independent body set up by a government to evaluate its expenditure and tax policy. Typically, councils are staffed by economists and statisticians who do not have the ability to set policy, but provide advice to governments and the public on the economic effects of government budgets and policy proposals. Some fiscal councils also provide economic forecasting. Fiscal councils evaluate government's fiscal policies, plans and performance publicly and independently, against macroeconomic objectives related to the long-term sustainability of public finances, short-to-medium-term macroeconomic stability, and other official objectives.

== History ==
Several fiscal councils arose following the 2008 financial crisis with the intention of avoiding debt crises and alleviating the problem of deficit bias, which is a tendency of governments to allow increasing long-term deficits. Analysis from the International Monetary Fund proposes that deficit bias results from both voters and policy-makers – the former through imperfect information on budgets and neglect for future generations, and the latter through imperfect information, information asymmetries, electoral pressures, a common-pool problem among government agencies, and a combination over optimistic spending and growth projections.

Fiscal councils alleviate deficit bias by providing independent non-partisan estimates of government income. The public will then, in theory, react to this information by supporting governments that deliver sustainable fiscal policies and electorally punishing governments that are fiscally irresponsible.

Fiscal councils, such as the United Kingdom's Office for Budget Responsibility, have been criticised for mostly advising from the perspective of neoclassical economics and advocating for balanced-budgets and small government, to the detriment of heterodox economic approaches based on the real economy and more interventionist New Keynesian approaches to the business cycle.

== Deficit bias ==
More countries in the world run budget deficits than not. In the long term, a high budget deficit is unsustainable. High budget deficits have aggravated crises like the European debt crisis. Governments that are unsure of being re-elected may ignore the long-term consequences of fiscal deficits and use generous fiscal policy to increase their chances of re-election. Voters may favour fiscal deficits because they benefit from tax cuts and public spending increases, and only bear part of the cost, the rest being borne by future generations. Alternatively, electorates vote for deficits because they are not fully aware of the problem.

== List of fiscal councils ==
- Office for Budget Responsibility (United Kingdom)
  - Scottish Fiscal Commission
- Federal Planning Bureau (Belgium)
- Parliamentary Budget Officer (Canada)
- National Assembly Budget Office (Korea)
- Congressional Budget Office (United States)
- Netherlands Bureau for Economic Policy Analysis
- Parliamentary Budget Office (Australia)
- High Council of Public Finances (France)
- Fiscal Council (Hungary)
- Irish Fiscal Advisory Council (Ireland)
- Council for Budget Responsibility (Slovakia)
- Independent Authority for Fiscal Responsibility (Spain)
- Independent Advisory Board of the Stability Council (Germany)
- Swedish Fiscal Policy Council (Sweden)
- European Fiscal Board (EU)
- Network of fiscal councils: EU Independent Fiscal Institutions Network

== See also ==
- List of countries by government debt
