= Haut Conseil des finances publiques =

Independent fiscal oversight body in France

High Council for Public Finance
- Haut Conseil des Finances Publiques
- Formation: December 2012; 13 years ago
- Purpose: Independent analysis of the public finances ahead of the budget
- Location: 13 rue Cambon, 75100 Paris, France
- Region served: France
- Chairman: Pierre Moscovici
- Website: www.hcfp.fr

The High Council of Public Finances (HCFP) (French: Haut Conseil des Finances Publiques) is a French independent fiscal oversight body. Its aim is to evaluate the assumptions made by the government in relation to the budgets and to ensure the coherence of public finances with the European budgetary agreements and pacts to which France is party. The HCFP operates under the responsibility of the French Court of Audit.

== History ==
body created by the Organic Law 2012-1403 in December 2012 by the French government in the framework European Union budgetary coordination. The HCFP is a member of the EU Independent Fiscal Institutions Network set up by the EU in September 2015 for international coordination.

== Legal basis ==
The HCFP operates under the authority granted to it by;

- Organic Law 2012-1403 on public finances governance
- European Budgetary Pact

== Objective ==
The HCFP reports of the following variables used by the government when setting the budget;

- GDP growth rate
- Revenues & Spending by central & local government and public bodies
- Revenues & Spending of the Social Security system
- Deviations between previous year forecasts and assumptions and outcomes

== Members ==
The membership comprises 11 members who are not remunerated. Four members are magistrates of the Court of Auditors, four members are designated by;

- the president of the national Assembly
- the president of the Senate
- the president of the Finance Commission of the National Assembly
- the president of the Finance Commission of the Senate

One member is designated by the President of the Economics, Social & Environment Council. Members serve a single 5-year term with the exception of Court of Auditor magistrates who may serve a second term.

== See also ==
- Fiscal council
- EU Independent Fiscal Institutions Network
- Court of Audit (Belgium)
- Parliamentary Budget Officer (Canada)
- National Assembly Budget Office (Korea)
- Congressional Budget Office (United States)
- CPB Netherlands Bureau for Economic Policy Analysis (Netherlands)
- Independent Authority for Fiscal Responsibility (Spain)
- Office of Budget Responsibility
