= Premiership of Pedro Sánchez =

Overview of the Spanish prime minister

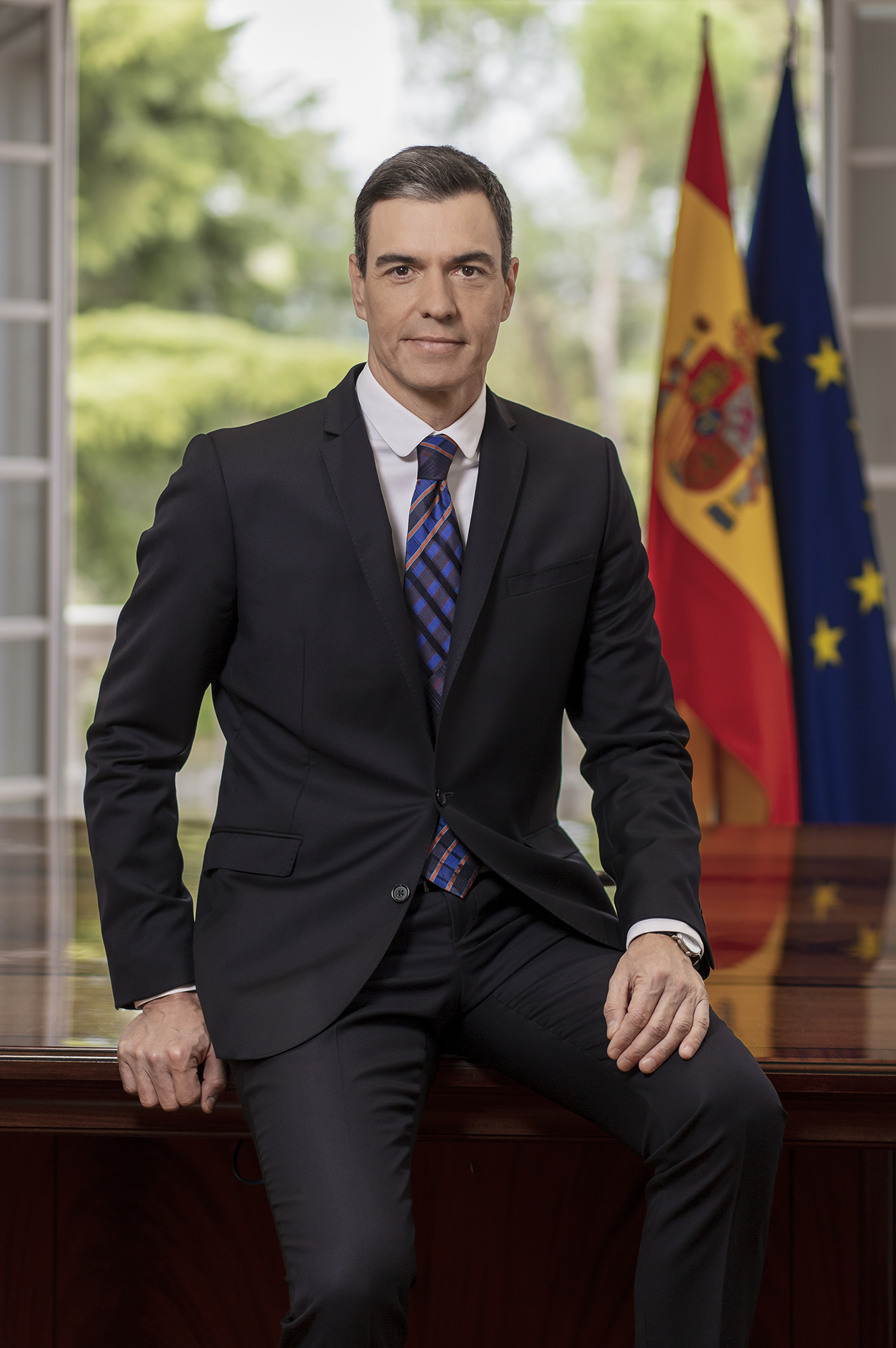
- Premiership of Pedro Sánchez; 2 June 2018 – present
- Monarch: Felipe VI
- Prime Minister: Pedro Sánchez
- Cabinet: Sánchez I Sánchez II; Sánchez III
- Party: PSOE
- Election: 2018; 2019; 2023
- Seat: Palace of Moncloa
- Coat of arms of Spain

The premiership of Pedro Sánchez began when he was sworn in as Prime Minister of Spain by King Felipe VI on 2 June 2018. Pedro Sánchez is the first prime minister in the recent Spanish history to reach the premiership after succeeding in a vote of no confidence against a ruling prime minister. He was also the first prime minister elected by Parliament without being a member of parliament.

During his speech as alternative candidate in the vote of no confidence, Sánchez said he planned to form a government that would eventually dissolve the Cortes Generales and call for a general election, but he did not specify when he would do it, while also saying that before calling for an election he intended take a series of measures like increasing unemployment benefits and proposing a law of equal pay between the sexes. However, he also said he would uphold the 2018 budget made by the Rajoy government, a condition the Basque Nationalist Party imposed to vote for the motion of no-confidence. Eventually, Sánchez was forced to resign when Parliament rejected the 2019 budget bill and he called for snap election.

After two general elections, Sánchez reached an agreement with the far-left Unidas Podemos electoral alliance in January 2020, forming Spain's first coalition government since the Second Republic (1931–1939). On 7 October 2020, Sanchez presented a financial plan for the remainder of his term in office that went beyond drafting a new budget and predicted the creation of 800,000 jobs over the next three years. He did not manage to finish his term, as he resigned again after the bad electoral results of the May 2023 local and regional elections, and asked the King to dissolve Parliament. Following the general election on 23 July 2023, Sánchez once again formed a coalition government, this time with Sumar (successors of Unidas Podemos).

Sánchez's premiership has been marked by several international events that have harmed Spanish interests, such as the COVID-19 pandemic, the fall of Kabul, the Russian invasion of Ukraine, the political instability in Latin America and the Gaza war, among others. At the same time, domestic events such as the Storm Filomena and the Cumbre Vieja volcanic eruption has also caused trouble during his premiership. In any case, Sánchez's policies have had a markedly pro-European character, and the prime minister's economic policy has been characterized by an increase in public spending and taxes, as well as direct opposition to the austerity policy carried out during the 2008–2014 Spanish financial crisis. Equality has been one of the most important elements, having increased minimum wage and promoted new laws against sexual assaults, an expansion of the abortion law and the approval of the trans law. In this sense, Sánchez has always maintained a balanced cabinet of men and women.

The opposition has criticized him for his pacts with regional parties, mainly of pro-independence ideology. These criticisms increased with the formation of his third government, since measures such as an amnesty law for Catalan independentists condemned by the 2017 illegal independence referendum caused numerous protests in the streets.

== Inauguration ==
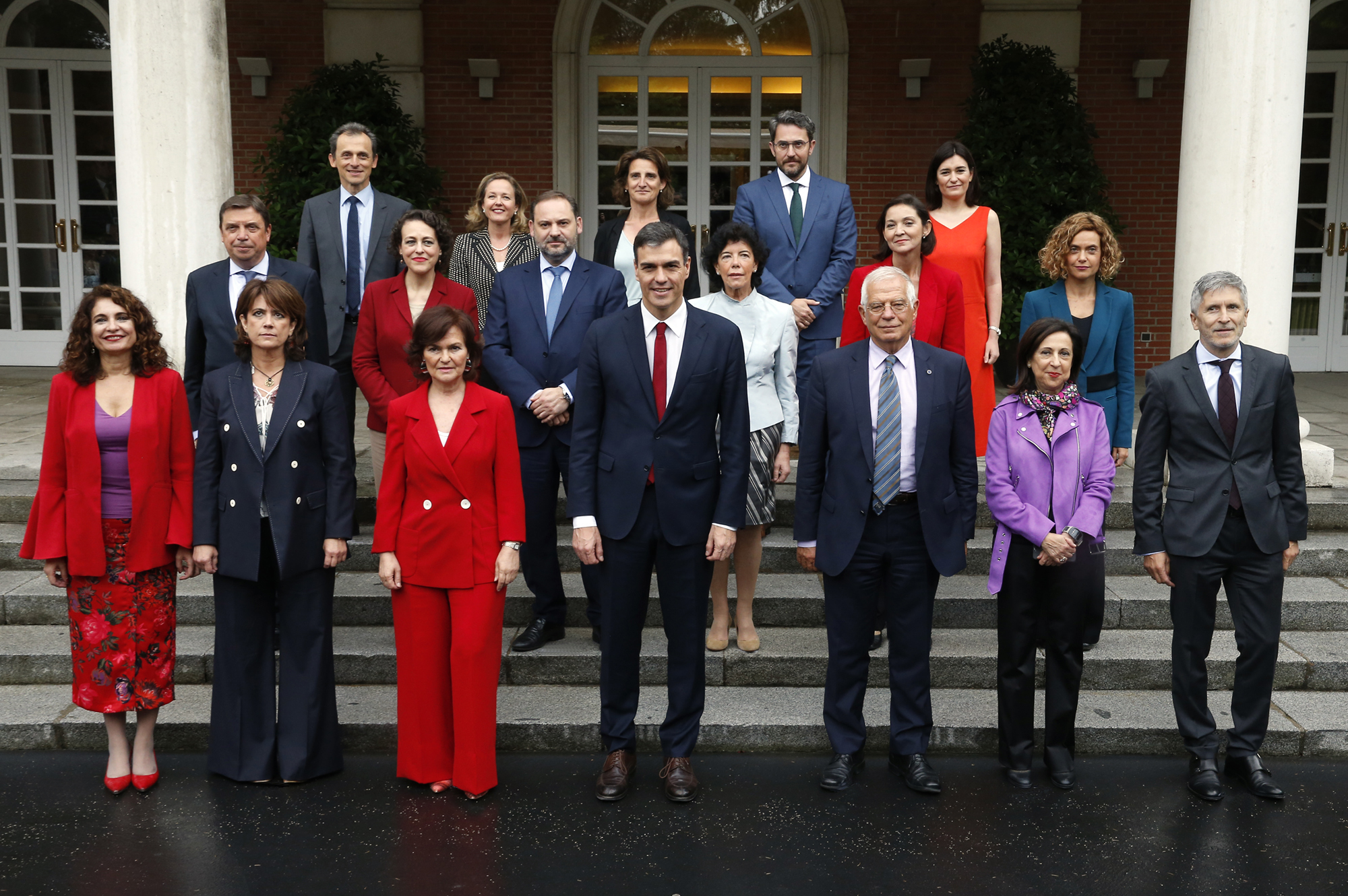
Sánchez and his new cabinet at La Moncloa in June 2018

Sánchez was appointed by the King on 1 June 2018 and took office the following day in his presence. Present at the ceremony, as is tradition, were former prime minister Mariano Rajoy, the First Notary of the Kingdom, Rafael Catalá, and the rest of the country's main authorities. Spanish media noted that while Sánchez was swearing his oath of office on the Spanish Constitution, no Bible nor crucifix were on display, for the first time in modern Spanish history due to Sánchez's atheism. After being sworn in, Sánchez announced that he would only propose measures that had considerable parliamentary support, and reaffirmed the government's compliance with the EU deficit requirements. The 17 ministers of his new cabinet took office on 7 June 2018. Sánchez formed a cabinet with 11 of the 18 ministerial positions of the Council being held by women.

== Domestic policy ==
=== Exhumation of Franco ===
On 18 June 2018, Sánchez' government announced its intention to remove the remains of former dictator Francisco Franco from the Valle de los Caídos. On 29 June 2018, the Archdiocese of Madrid warned the Spanish government against any plans to exhume the remains of Franco without first obtaining agreement from interested parties and formally stated it is against any move of Franco's remains without the consent of his family and before consultation with the Catholic Church. In addition, in its statement the Archdiocese of Madrid re-affirmed its position that although the Valle de los Caídos is officially a national monument, the Catholic Church must be consulted on burial-related matters under agreements between the Spanish state and the Vatican. The announcement of the Archdiocese of Madrid was made after Pedro Sánchez confirmed that it was his intention to remove the remains of Franco from the Valle de los Caídos by the end of July.

On 24 August 2018, Sánchez's cabinet approved a decree that modified two aspects of the 2007 Historical Memory Law to allow the exhumation of Franco's remains from the Valle de los Caídos. The decree, to become law, had to be passed by a vote of the Congress of Deputies. The conservative People's Party (PP) and the centre-right party Ciudadanos (Cs) announced they would not support the decree. The PP further stated it would appeal the measure to the Constitutional Court arguing that using a decree to change the Historical Memory Law was not valid because the proposed modifications to the Historical Memory Law did not respond to a situation of urgent need. Deputy Prime Minister Carmen Calvo stated the decree law required the exhumation of the remains of Franco to take place between 30 days and 12 months of passage by the Congress of Deputies. The Congress of Deputies voted in favor of the exhumation on 13 September 2018. After a year of legal battles with Franco's descendants, the exhumation took place on 24 October 2019, and Franco was reburied at Mingorrubio Cemetery in El Pardo with his wife Carmen Polo.

In November 2018, the Mossos d'Esquadra reported the arrest of a Terrassa resident who was angry with the exhumation plans. He had an arsenal of 16 firearms at home, (Note: Including a CETME assault rifle, a Skorpion vz. 61 and four long-range rifles able to hit a target located 1,500 m away from the sniper.) and carried two guns in his car, one of them modified. The man allegedly planned to kill Sánchez in order to finish, in his own words, with that "shitty red".

=== Snap election and deadlock ===
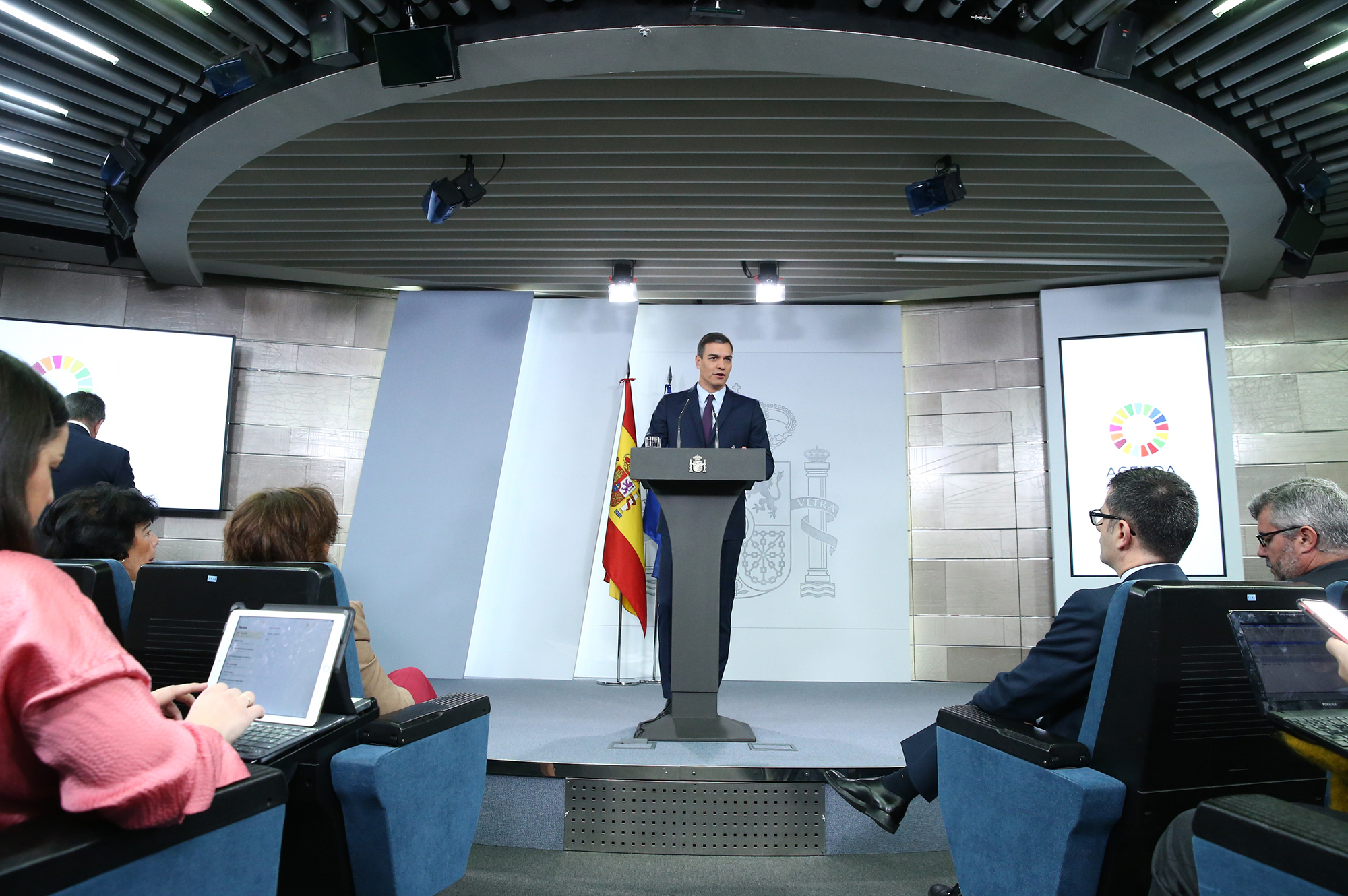
Prime Minister Sánchez announcing a snap election for 28 April 2019.

After the rejection of his budget, Sánchez called an early general election for 28 April 2019, making a television announcement in which he declared that "between doing nothing and continuing with the [former] budget and calling on Spaniards to have their say, I chose the second. Spain needs to keep advancing, progressing with tolerance, respect, moderation and common sense".

The PSOE won the election, obtaining 29% of the vote which translated into 123 seats in the Congress of Deputies, well over the 85 seats and 23% share of the vote the party obtained in the 2016 election. PSOE also won a majority in the Senate. Whilst the PSOE were 53 seats short of the 176 seats needed for an outright majority in the Congress of Deputies, a three-way split in the centre-right vote assured that it was the only party that could realistically form a government.

On 6 June 2019, King Felipe VI, having previously held prospective meetings with the spokespeople of the political groups with representation in the new Congress of Deputies, formally proposed Sánchez as prospective prime minister. Sánchez accepted the task of trying to form a government "with honor and responsibility". Several weeks of negotiations with Podemos ended in an agreement that Sánchez would appoint several Podemos members to the Cabinet, although not the party's leader Pablo Iglesias. But in the final voting session, Podemos rejected the agreement and led Sánchez to try a second chance to be inaugurated in September.

=== Catalan separatism ===
Sánchez said he would "reinstate dialogue" with the Catalan independence movement. In order to do so, the central government and the regional government reactivated intergovernmental commissions, a series of bodies composed by representatives of both governments. Although there was some progress in the economic field, these commissions were paralyzed by the Catalonia regional government's demand to speak about a self-determination referendum, something that the central government rejected and in February 2019 the central government considered the relations between the two governments broken. In December 2018, the FT reported that Sánchez "has warned Catalonia's government that he could deploy national police to the region, as tension flares up again between Madrid and Catalan separatists a year after a failed secession attempt". The distance between the two governments became clear when the parliamentary opposition—among which was Catalan separatism—rejected the government's budget. After this, the prime minister called a snap election.

After the sentence in 2019 trial of Catalonia independence leaders Sánchez confirmed its support for the sentence, and denied possibility of any indulgence, proclaiming that the sentence should be served by convicts in its entirety, in spite of that two years later Sánchez granted indulgence to all convicts. Shortly after granting the indulgence, Sánchez stressed that, despite that, there never will be a referendum for the independence of Catalonia, in response he was mocked by Gabriel Rufian and other Catalan politicians, who reminded that two years before he claimed the same with regards to the indulgence, and insinuated that it is just a matter of time before Sánchez will break his latest claims.

=== COVID-19 pandemic ===
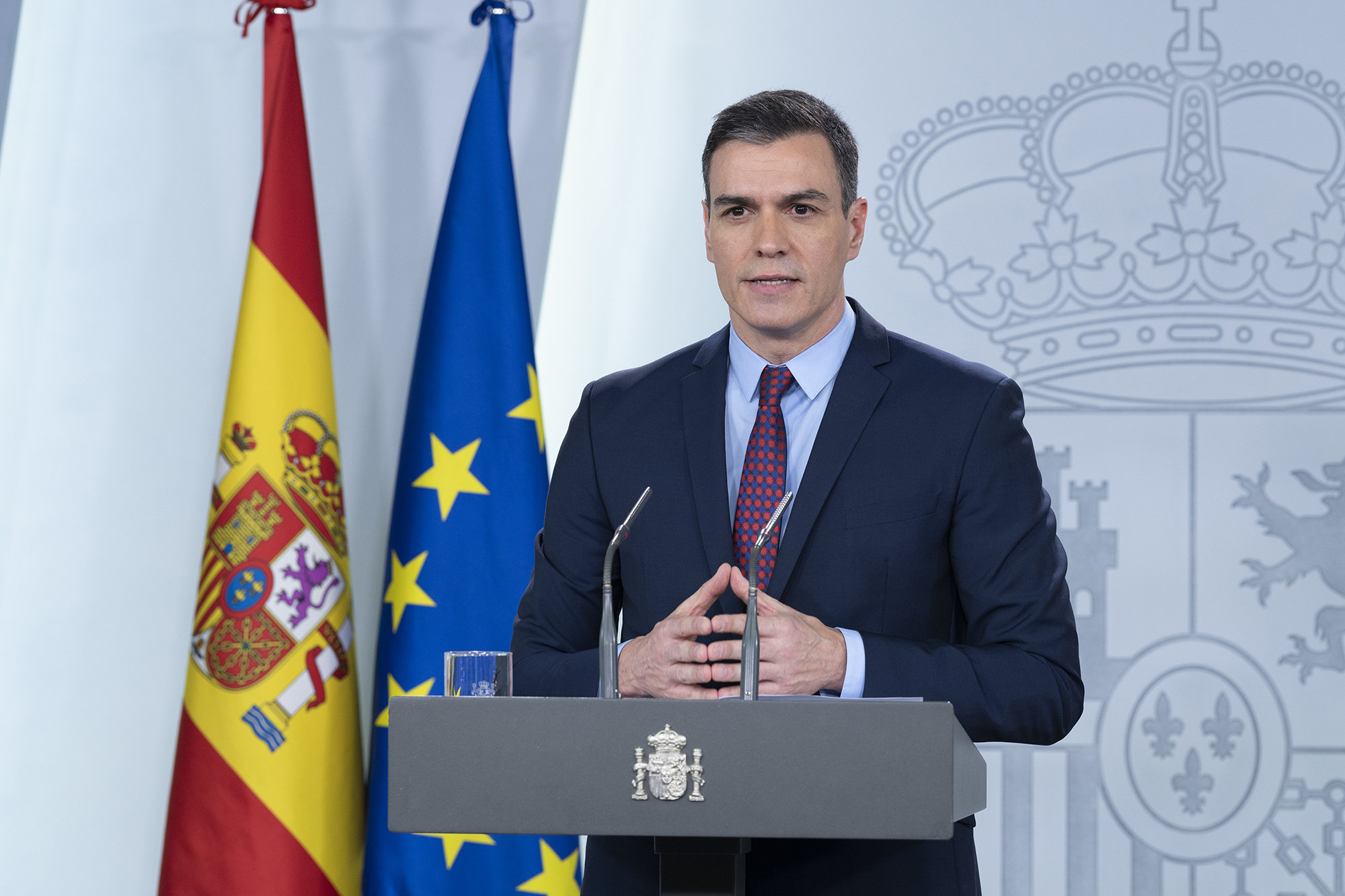
Sánchez announcing the state of alarm on 13 March 2020.

On 13 March 2020, Sánchez announced a declaration of the state of alarm in the nation for a period of 15 days, to become effective the following day after the approval of the Council of Ministers, becoming the second time in democratic history and the first time with this magnitude. The following day imposed a nationwide lockdown, banning all trips that were not force majeure and announced it may intervene in companies to guarantee supplies. On 14 July 2021, the Constitutional Court, acting upon the 2020'th appeal by Vox, sentenced by a narrow majority (6 votes in support vs. 5 votes against) that the state of alarm was inconstitutional in the part of suppressing the freedom of movement established by the Article 19 of the Constitution.

=== Social media ===
On 3 February 2026, Sánchez announced plans to restrict access to social media platforms for users under the age of 16 during the World Governments Summit in Dubai. Following the announcement, X owner Elon Musk responded by labeling Sánchez a "tyrant" and a "fascist totalitarian."

=== Economic policy ===
==== Bank consolidation ====
In early September 2020, state-controlled bank Bankia and Caixabank announced that they were very close to a deal to merge both banks. That merge would create the biggest domestic bank in Spain, surpassing Santander and BBVA. Unidas Podemos, the coalition partner of the second Sánchez government and its leader, Second Deputy Prime Minister Pablo Iglesias rejected the merger describing it as a "privatization" and criticized that Third Deputy Prime Minister Calviño never revealed to them the existence of this talks.

Calviño, whose signature was more than enough to authorize the merger, received the support of the prime minister, who described the merger as something "positive" for the Spanish economy and the "territorial cohesion" since the bank would extend its influence from two to four Spanish regions. Days later, Calviño described the banking consolidation as "probably inevitable" to keep the solvency and competitiveness of the banking sector in the future, but at the same time she warned that this type of operations should be carried out respecting competition and the interests of consumers and that the CNMC would be watching. On 17 September 2020, the boards of both banks approved the merger. The new bank, which will maintain the Caixabank brand, will have the Spanish government as the second largest shareholder, with 16.1% of the shares.

== Foreign policy ==
=== Europe ===
==== European Union ====
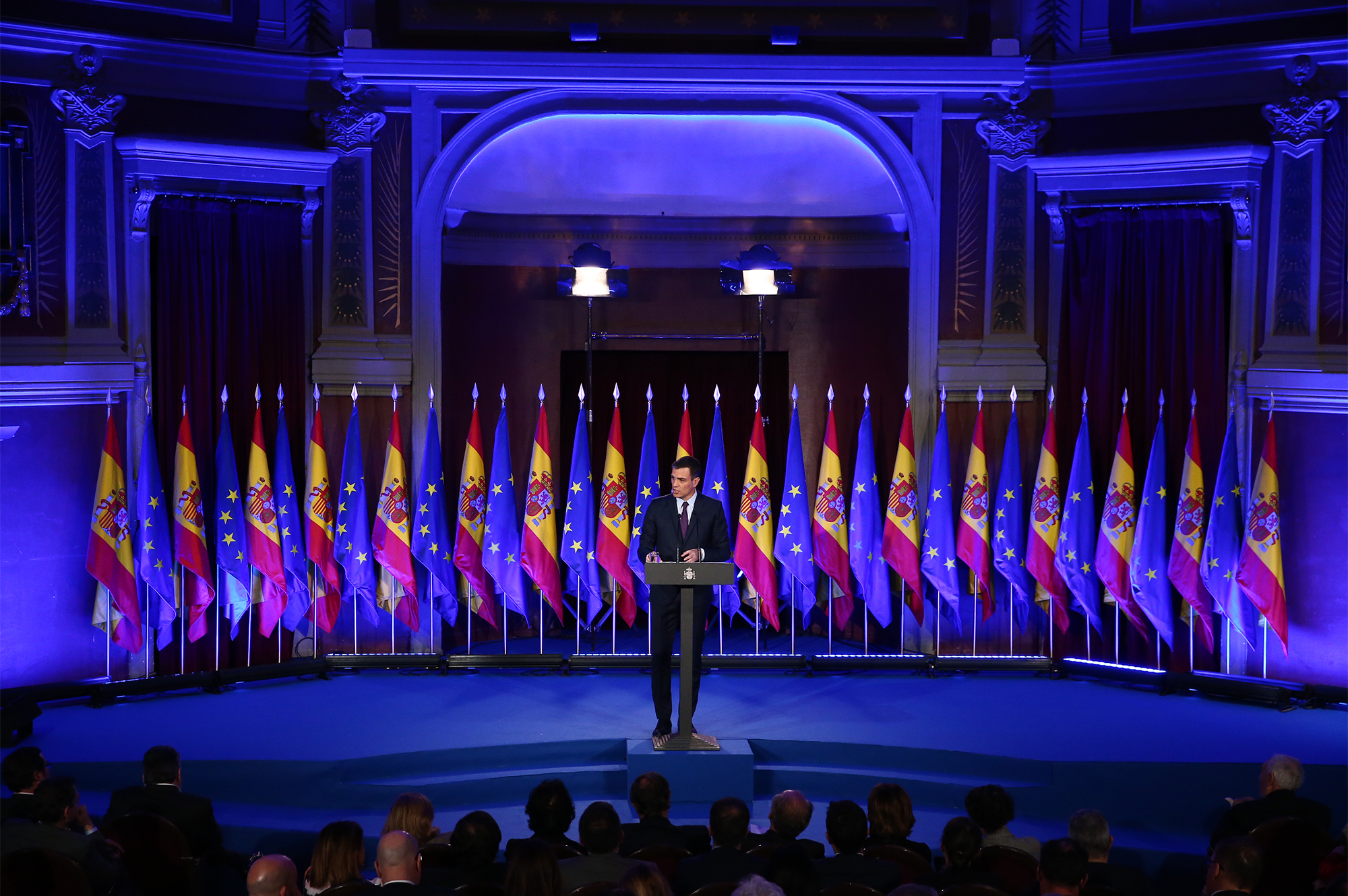
Sánchez during his speech at the event organized by the Spanish Federal Council of the European Movement on 19 March 2019.

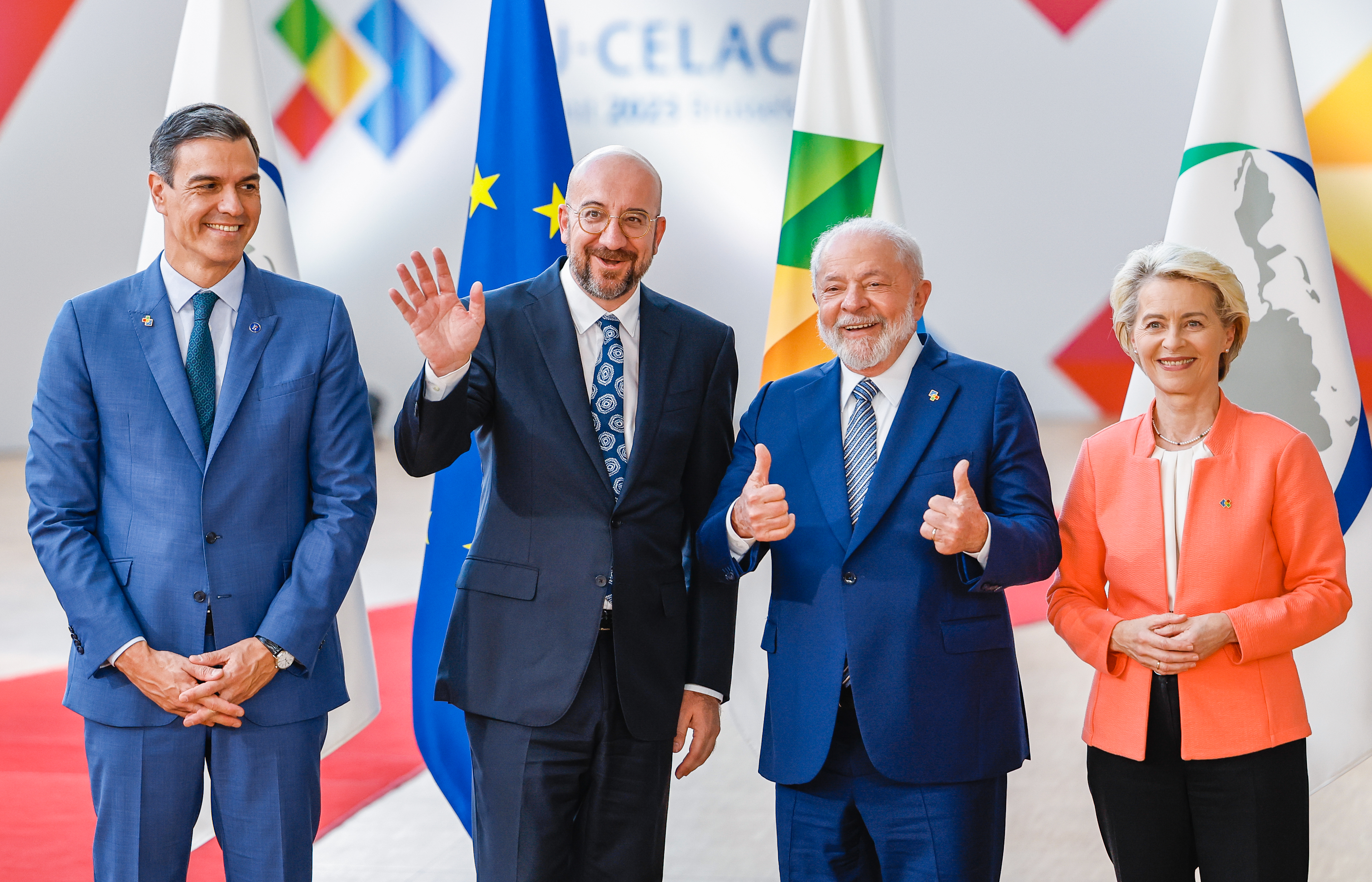
Sánchez with the President of the European Council Charles Michel, Brazilian President Luiz Inácio Lula da Silva and European Commission President Ursula von der Leyen, 17 July 2023

Since his arrival to power he has been strongly pro-European. This is evidenced by changes including the renaming of the Foreign Ministry to the Ministry of Foreign Affairs, European Union and Cooperation, and reverting the secretary of state for European affairs back to its original name, the secretary of State for the European Union. He appointed Josep Borrell, former president of the European Parliament, as foreign minister, and Nadia Calviño as minister of economy, who served as director-general for the EU budget, and Secretary-General of the European Economic and Social Committee Luis Planas as Minister of Agriculture, Fisheries and Food.

He also took a more active role in the international sphere, especially in the European Union, saying that "Spain has to claim its role" and declaring himself "a militant pro-European".

On 16 January 2019, in a speech before the European Parliament, he said that the EU should be protected and turned into a global actor, and that a more social Europe is needed, with a strong monetary union. He stated in a speech in March 2019 adding that the enemies of Europe are inside of the European Union.

Sánchez, wanting to recover the weight of Spain in the European institutions, actively participated in the negotiations to form a new European Commission, led by Von Der Leyen. In this sense, Sánchez guaranteed for Spain the post of High Representative of the Union for Foreign Affairs and Security Policy, with Josep Borrell, the then Spanish foreign minister, as the high representative.

In his second government, he continued strengthening the pro-European profile of its ministers, appointing José Luis Escrivá, the then chair of the Independent Authority for Fiscal Responsibility and former chair of the EU Independent Fiscal Institutions Network, as minister for social security.

In June 2020, the Sánchez government proposed deputy prime minister and economy minister, Nadia Calviño, to be the next chair of the Eurogroup.

==== Gibraltar ====
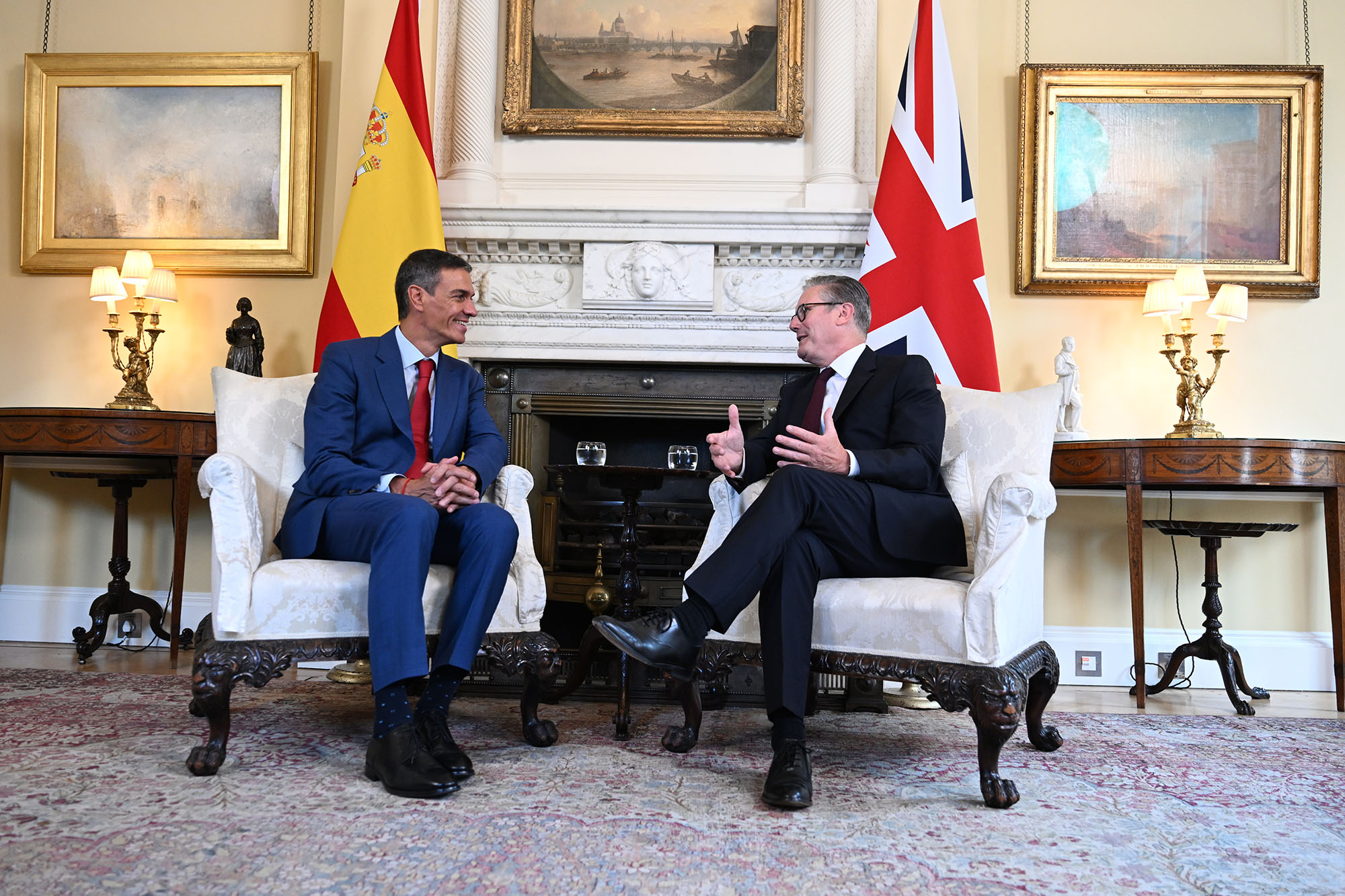
Sánchez with British Prime Minister Keir Starmer at 10 Downing Street in London, 3 September 2025

Sánchez has called for joint U.K.-Spanish sovereignty over British-controlled Gibraltar, a British Overseas Territory in the south of the Iberian peninsula. He publicly warned that Spain will "veto" Brexit deal over the issue of Gibraltar. In November 2018, Sánchez said that "With Brexit we all lose, especially the United Kingdom, but when it comes to Gibraltar, Spain wins."

On 31 December 2020, hours before the deadline for the final departure from the United Kingdom, the Spanish and British governments reached a pre-agreement on the Rock. The agreement consisted of keeping Gibraltar within the Schengen Area under the responsibility of Spain as the member state of the Schengen Agreement. For border control and for a period of four years, it would be the European Border and Coast Guard Agency (Frontex), under Spanish authority, who would carry out this task. It also involved the demolition of the border fence.

=== Middle East ===
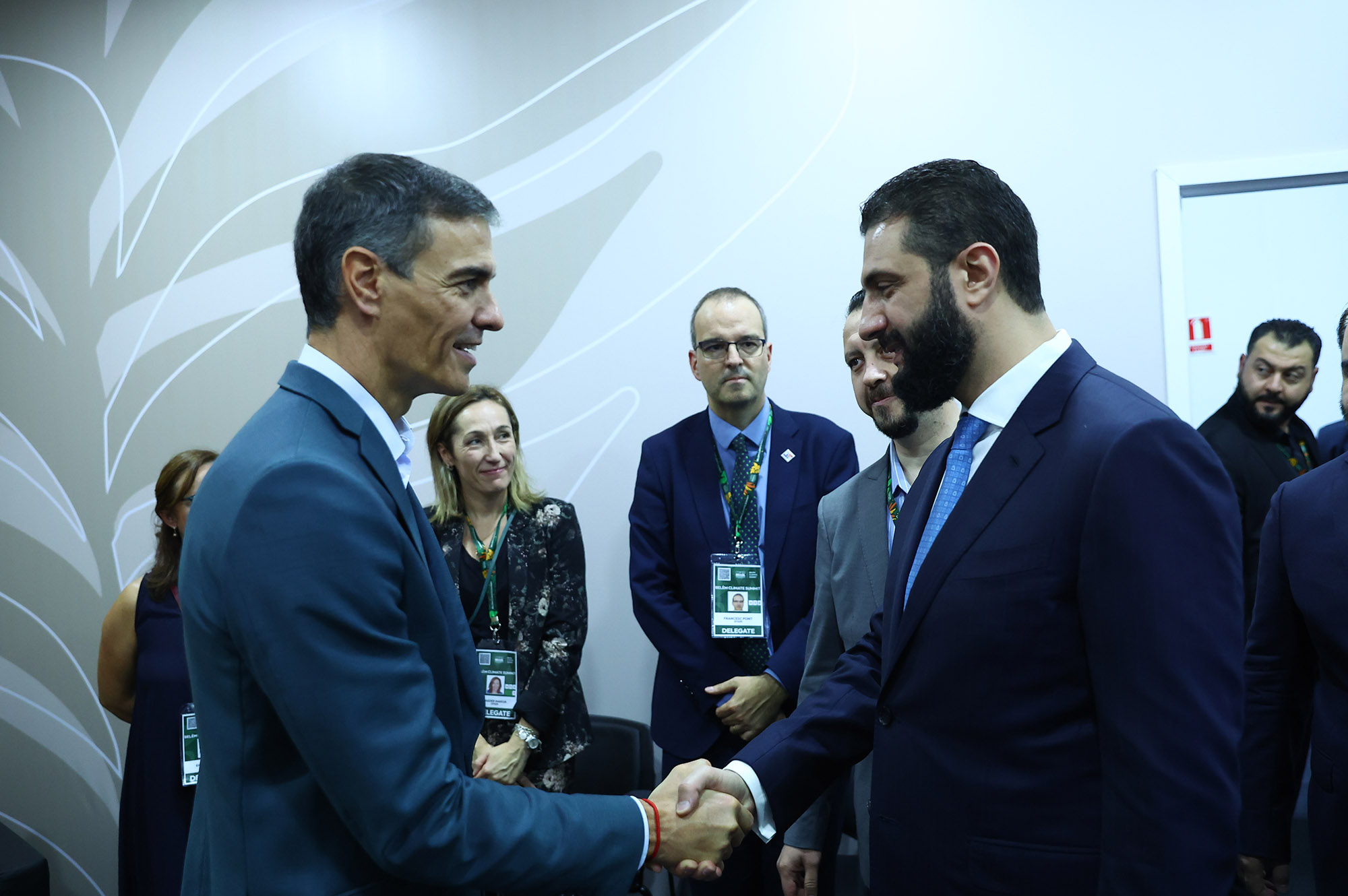
Sánchez with Syrian President Ahmed al-Sharaa during the COP30 summit in Brazil, 7 November 2025

==== Saudi Arabia ====
In September 2018, Defense Minister Margarita Robles cancelled sales of laser-guided bombs to Saudi Arabia over concerns relating to the Saudi Arabian-led intervention in Yemen. Overruling Robles, Sánchez ordered the sale to proceed because he had guaranteed President of Andalusia Susana Díaz help to protect jobs in the shipyards of the Bay of Cádiz, highly dependent on the €1.813 billion contract with Saudi Arabia to deliver five corvettes. In response to the killing of Saudi dissident journalist Jamal Khashoggi in October 2018, Sánchez defended the decision to continue arms sales to Saudi Arabia and insisted on his government's "responsibility" to protect jobs in the arms industry.

==== 2021 Afghanistan crisis ====
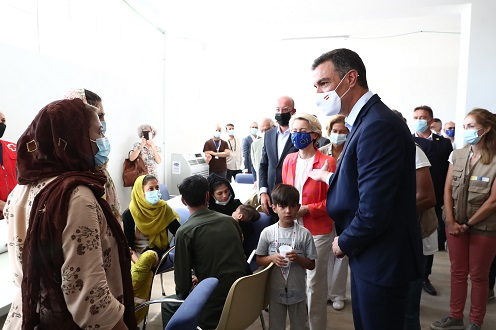
Sánchez and European Union officials greeting Afghan refugees at Torrejón de Ardoz, 21 August 2021

Following the fall of Kabul and the subsequent de facto creation of the Islamic Emirate of Afghanistan, the prime minister offered Spain as a hub for Afghans who collaborated with the European Union, which would later be settled in various countries. The Spanish government created a temporary refugee camp in the air base of Torrejón de Ardoz, which was later visited by officials from the European Union, including president of the European Commission Ursula von der Leyen and president of the European Council Charles Michel. Von der Leyen praised Sánchez government's initiative, stating that the actions of Spain represents "a good example of the european soul at its best". US President Joe Biden spoke with Sánchez to allow the use of the military bases of Rota and Morón to temporarily accommodate Afghan refugees, while praising "Spain's leadership in seeking international support for Afghan women and girls". During this operation, the Spanish Armed Forces used four Airbus A400M Atlas as well as civil resources from the Air Europa airline to evacuate Spanish diplomats, nationals and Afghan citizens. The security team of the embassy, composed by 17 police officers from the GEO (special operations) and UIP (experts in mass control and VIP security), were responsible for locating and taking the collaborators to a safe place. Days later, the Spanish Army Special Operations Command (green berets) were also deployed in the Afghan capital. On 27 August, the operation was finished with 2,206 persons evacuated.

==== Israel and Palestine ====
In October 2023, the conflict between Israel and Palestine was revived following a terrorist attack by Hamas which, in addition to missile attacks, carried out a massive incursion into territory controlled by Israel to murder and kidnap hundreds of people. To this situation, Israel responded with maximum harshness, constantly bombing the Gaza Strip, territory controlled by Hamas.

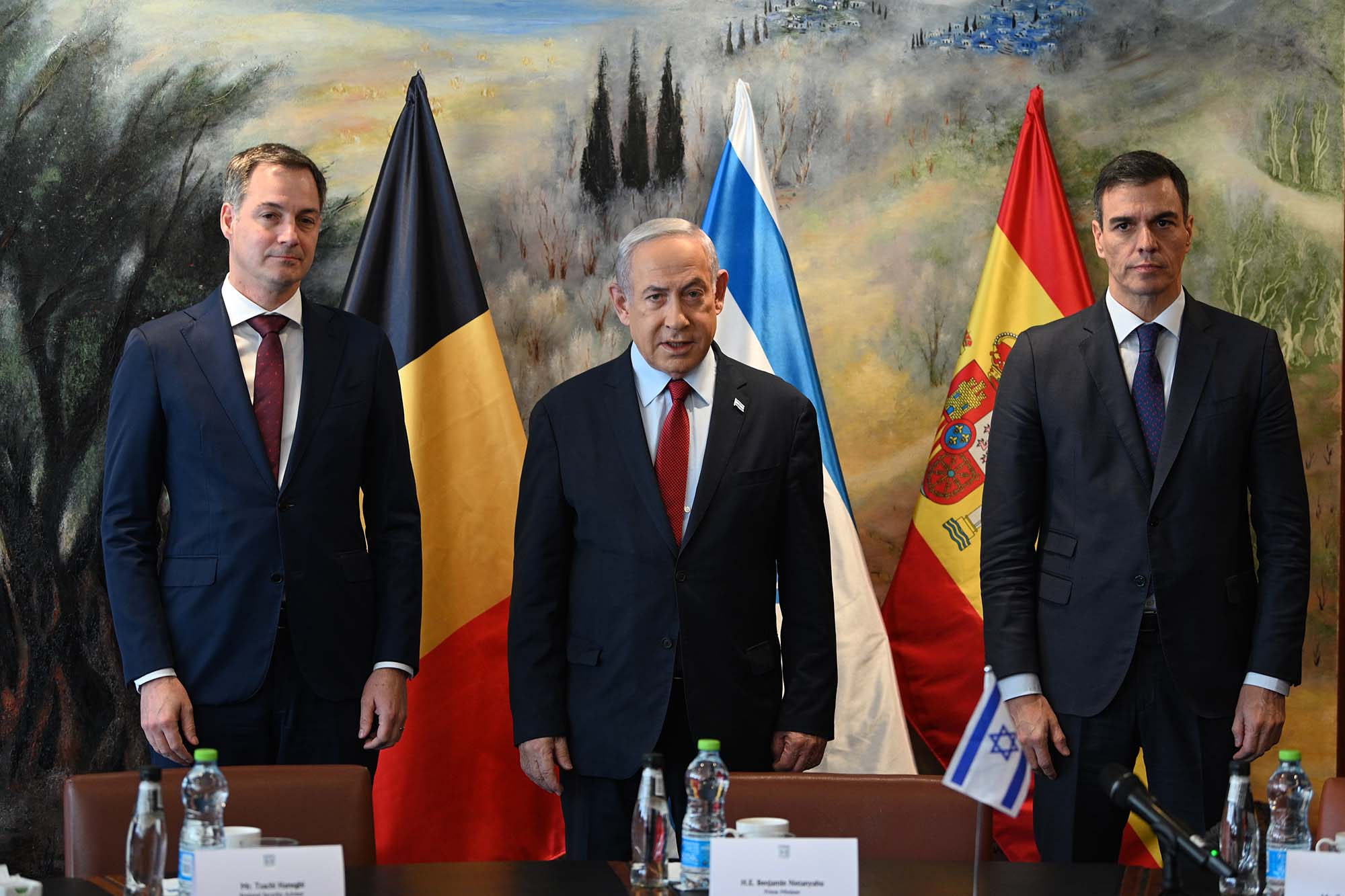
The prime minister and the Belgian prime minister, Alexander De Croo, together with Israeli prime minister Benjamin Netanyahu.

On 27 October 2023, Israel began a ground invasion of the strip, with the objective, in the words of Israeli prime minister Benjamin Netanyahu, of providing security to the strip and, therefore, to Israel. The extreme harshness of the Israeli response was unanimously rejected by the Spanish left, with the events being described by the acting minister of Social Rights and Agenda 2030, Ione Belarra, as "genocidal". This caused unrest in Israeli diplomacy, although the intervention of the Spanish foreign minister, José Manuel Albares, reduced the tension.

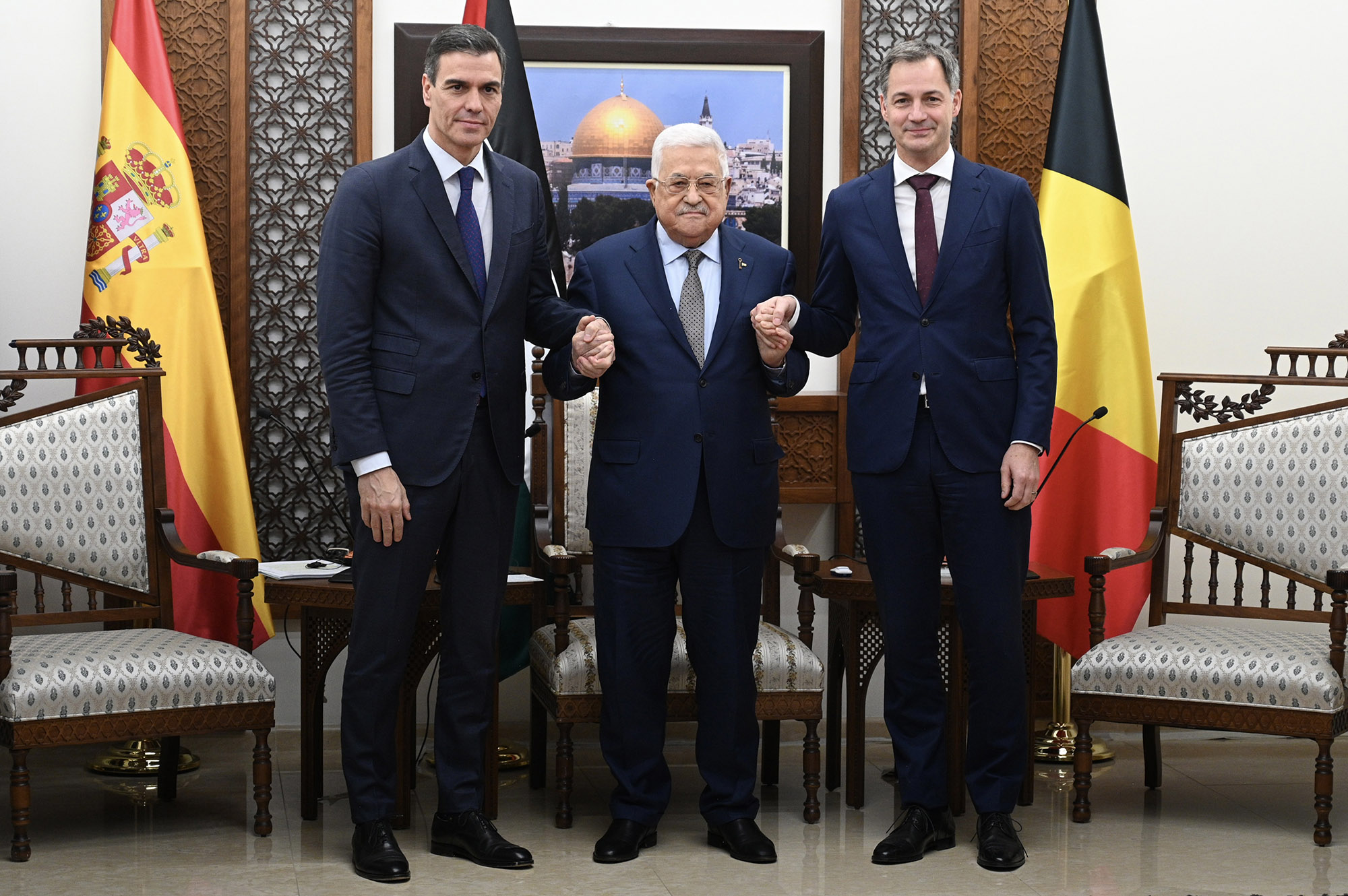
The prime minister and the Belgian prime minister, together with the president of the Palestinian National Authority, Mahmoud Abbas.

On 15 November 2023, acting prime minister and premiership candidate, Pedro Sánchez, referred to the conflict in his investiture speech, calling for an "immediate ceasefire", as well as announcing the intention of his government to work so that Spain and the European Union recognize the State of Palestine. Sánchez traveled to Israel and Palestine on 23 November 2023, meeting with Benjamin Netanyahu and Mahmoud Abbas, president of the Palestinian National Authority, before whom he defended that the only possible solution to the conflict is the recognition of the two States.

Precisely, on 24 November, after a visit to the Rafah border in Egypt, the statements of the prime minister and the Belgian prime minister —who insisted on what was already mentioned above: two-state solution, international and humanitarian law, protection of civilian lives, etc.— provoked a new diplomatic conflict, with the ambassadors of both European countries being summoned by the Israeli foreign minister, Eli Cohen, for a "harsh conversation of reprimand" after describing the statements of both leaders as "supporting The terrorism". In response, the Spanish Foreign Minister did the same in response to the "unacceptable and false" accusations.

On 30 November 2023, after an interview by the prime minister on RTVE in which he declared that he had "serious doubts that they [the Israelis] are complying with international humanitarian law", the Israeli Government called for consultations to his ambassador.

In May 2025, Sánchez called Israel a "genocidal state" and said that Spain "does not do business" with such a country. In September 2025, he drew controversy by remarking: "Spain does not have nuclear bombs. We cannot stop the Israeli offensive alone, but we will not stop trying."

==== Iran ====
In January 2026, the government of Pedro Sánchez condemned the violence against protesters in Iran.

=== Immigration ===
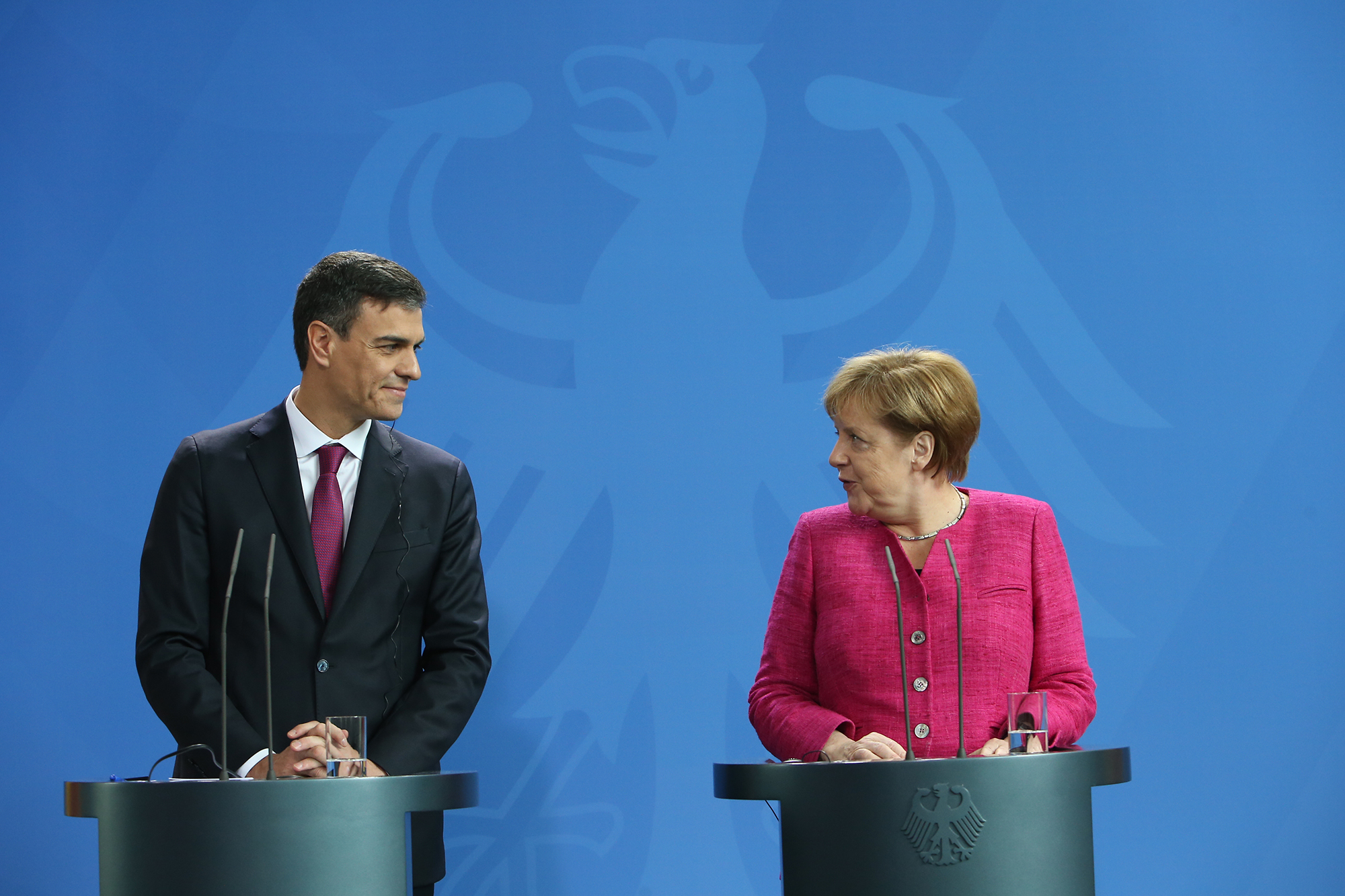
Sánchez with German chancellor Angela Merkel, 26 June 2018

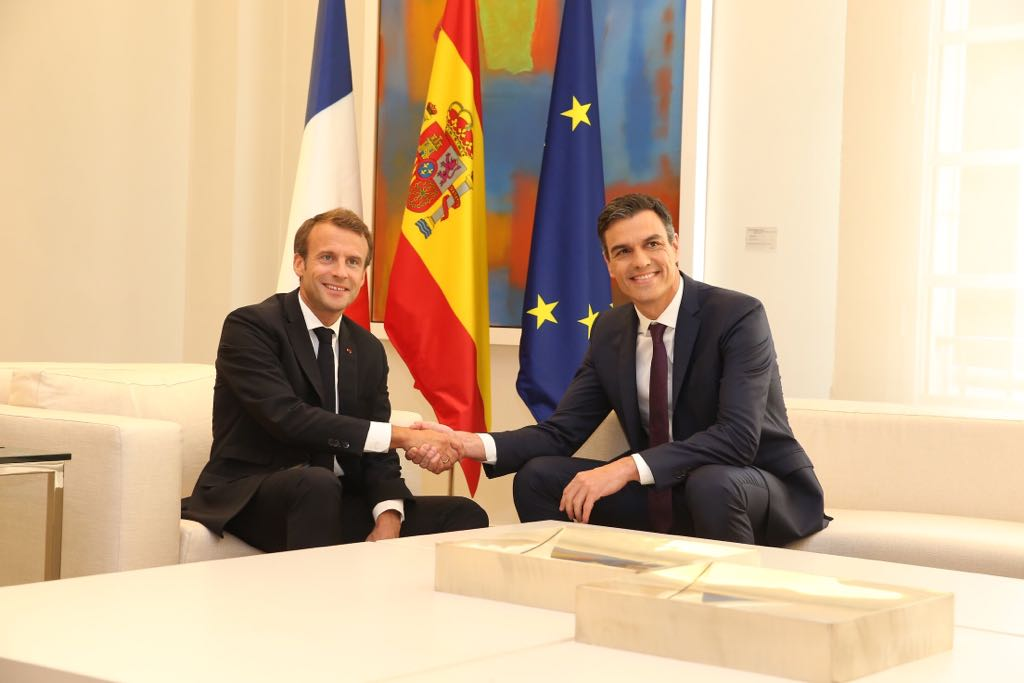
Sánchez with French president Emmanuel Macron, 26 July 2018

In June 2018, the ship Aquarius carrying 629 migrants that were rescued near Libya was denied entry to the Sicilian port by Italy's new Interior Minister Matteo Salvini. The Spanish government offered the Aquarius the chance to dock in the secure port of Valencia, Spain and the Italian navy offered full assistance and a marine escort for the trip. On 4 July 2018, the Spanish government accepted another NGO vessel, in this case a Spanish NGO called Open Arms carrying 60 migrants after Italy rejected again open a port for the ship. The same happened two weeks later.The prime minister considered the immigration matter as a European matter and showed Spain's solidarity with the German Government by accepting an agreement between Germany, Greece and Spain to swap migrants to share their economic costs, prevent secondary movements, and reunite families. "Unilateralism not the answer to migrant crisis", he said in an interview in a clear reference to the initiative of the Italian Government to close the ports while also stating: "As effective as the inflammatory rhetoric from some Italian leaders may be in electoral terms, from the point of view of responding effectively to a humanitarian crisis like the one we're seeing in the Mediterranean and on the Italian coast, it's not the answer".

On 9 October 2024, Sánchez urged the European Parliament to speed up the implementation of the New Pact on Migration and Asylum to alleviate the migration crisis in the Canary Islands, which had seen the illegal arrival of a record number of 46,843 migrants, mostly from Senegal, Mali and Morocco (up from 39,910 in 2023). Sánchez tried to push through a law that would introduce mandatory distribution of migrants among Spanish regions in order to alleviate pressure in the Canary Islands.

Sánchez has supported policies aimed at encouraging immigration as a strategy to counteract Spain's demographic decline and aging population. In January 2026, Sánchez authorized a decree aimed at regularizing approximately 500,000 undocumented immigrants residing in Spain. On July 2026, almost 1.2 million of Spain's undocumented migrants appled for legal status. More than twice the expected number of 500,000.

During the 2020s, Spain under Premiership of Sánchez has seen a wave of large-scale migrant breaches into Spanish territory occur, in 2021 (approximately 8,000 illegal immigrants) and in 2026 (approximately 60,000 illegal immigrants).

=== Latin America ===
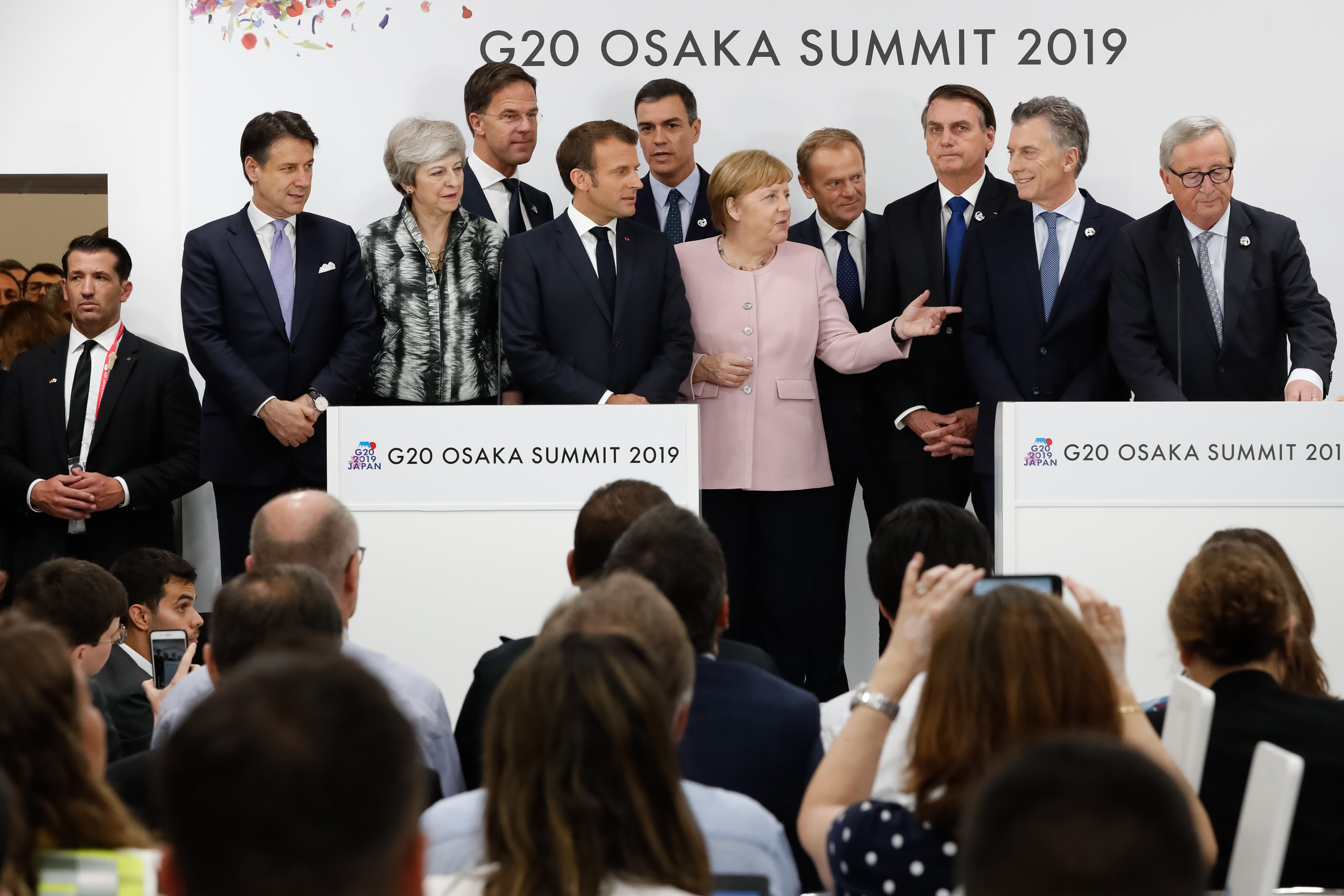
EU and Mercosur leaders meeting at the G20 summit in June 2019

Sánchez has been a strong advocate for finalizing the long-negotiated European Union–Mercosur Free Trade Agreement, which aims to establish one of the world's largest free trade areas.

==== Argentina ====
In February 2020, the Spanish government published a press release indicating they would support Argentina during their current debt restructuring efforts, after a meeting between the two nations in the Palace of Moncloa. During the meeting, both countries mentioned their "unbreakable bond" and the "bridge Spain represents between the EU and Latin America".

==== Bolivia ====
In December 2019, Jeanine Áñez accused the governments of Spain and Mexico of attempting to evacuate members of the Evo Morales government during the 2019 Bolivian political crisis. The Bolivian president expelled Mexico's ambassador and two Spanish diplomats, to which the Sanchez government responded by declaring three Bolivian diplomats as persona non grata. Spain also denied any claims of involvement in "Bolivia's internal affairs".

==== Venezuela ====
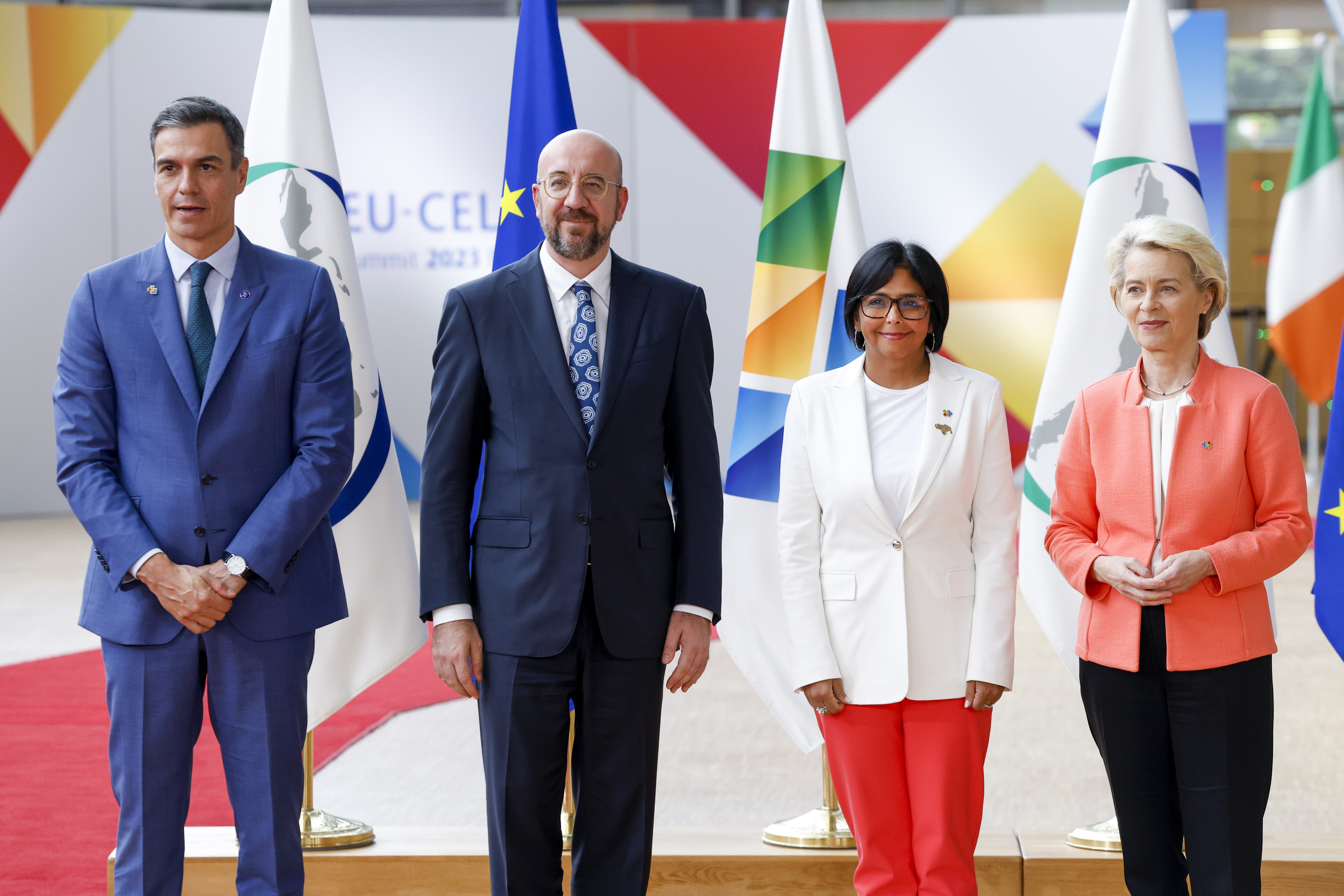
Sánchez, Charles Michel and Ursula von der Leyen with Venezuelan Vice President Delcy Rodríguez in Brussels in 2023

On 26 January 2019, in the context of the Venezuelan presidential crisis, the Spanish premier Pedro Sánchez asked Nicolás Maduro for the calling of an election within an 8-day deadline. After Maduro did not do so, Spain was so the first leading EU country to recognize Venezuelan opposition leader Juan Guaido as interim president.

In October 2020, opposition leader Leopoldo López fled to Spain after taking refuge in the Spanish embassy during the 2019 uprising. He arrived to Spain on the 25th, then met with Sanchez on the 27th. The Spanish Socialist Workers' Party's Twitter account uploaded a video of the meeting.

On 9 September 2021, Spain arrested General Hugo Carvajal, "Chávez's eyes and ears in the Venezuelan military", on US drug charges.

In January 2026, Sánchez criticized the U.S. military intervention in Venezuela, during which President Nicolás Maduro was captured. He stated on social media that "International law and the principles of the United Nations Charter must be respected" and called for immediate "de-escalation and responsibility."

=== United States ===
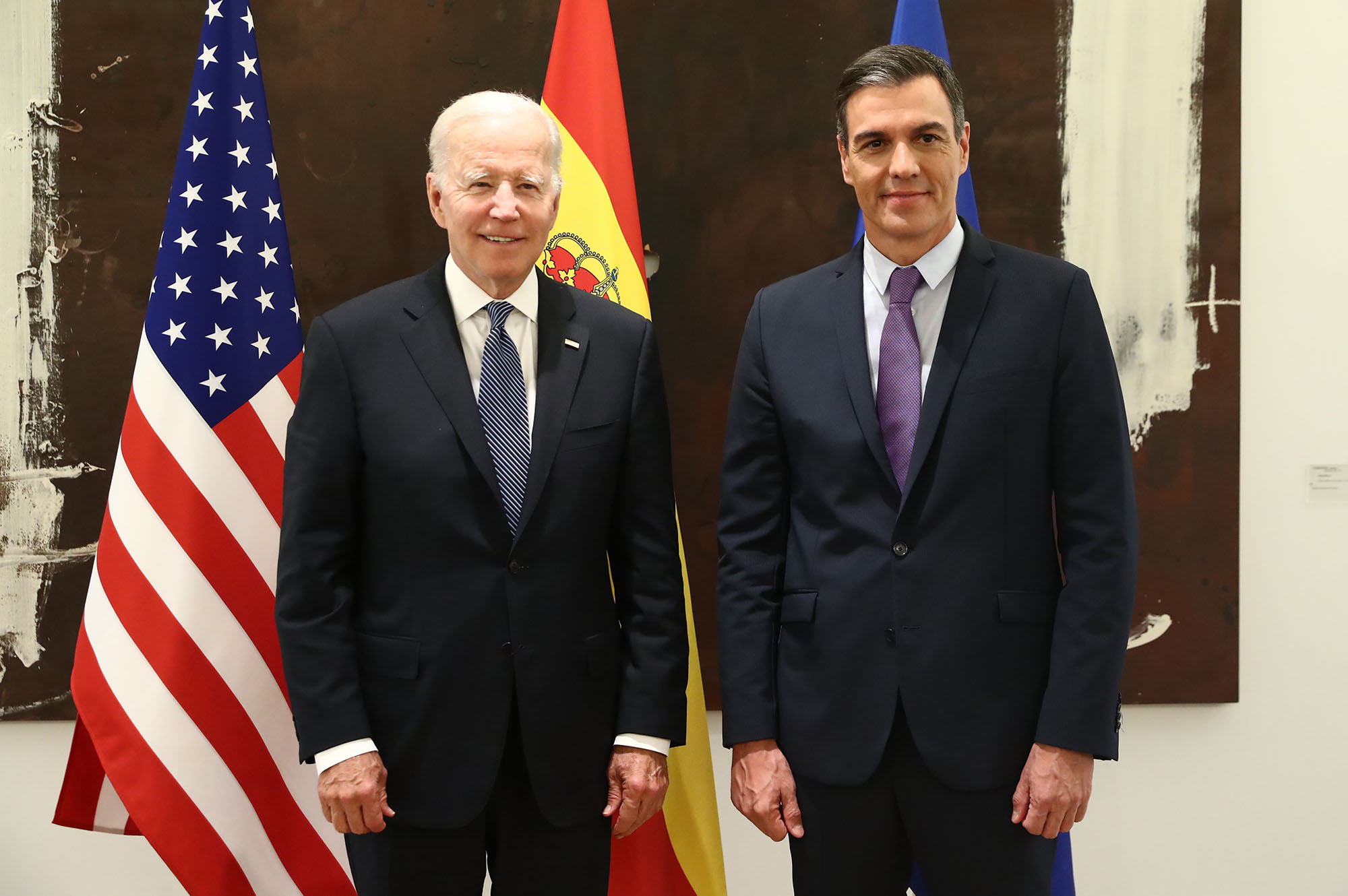
Sánchez with U.S. president Joe Biden, 28 June 2022

==== Economic relations ====
In July 2020, Airbus announced it would stop receiving financial support from Spain and France after the WTO declared it illegal and unfair to competitor Boeing. The Trump administration had used the case as justification to enact tariffs on US$7.5 billion of European exports to the country.

==== Capitol Riots ====
In relation to the assault on the Capitol, the Prime Minister assured that he was not surprised by what had happened after four years of "reactionary populism" exercised by Donald Trump. "There is no democracy without democratic institutions, respect for the rule of law and the law," he assured, asking Spanish citizens to take this as a "lesson" and to "reinforce something very important in our country, our adherence to the Constitution, that encourages us to fulfill it in word and deed from beginning to end, not in parts or at times, but at all hours".

== Scandals ==
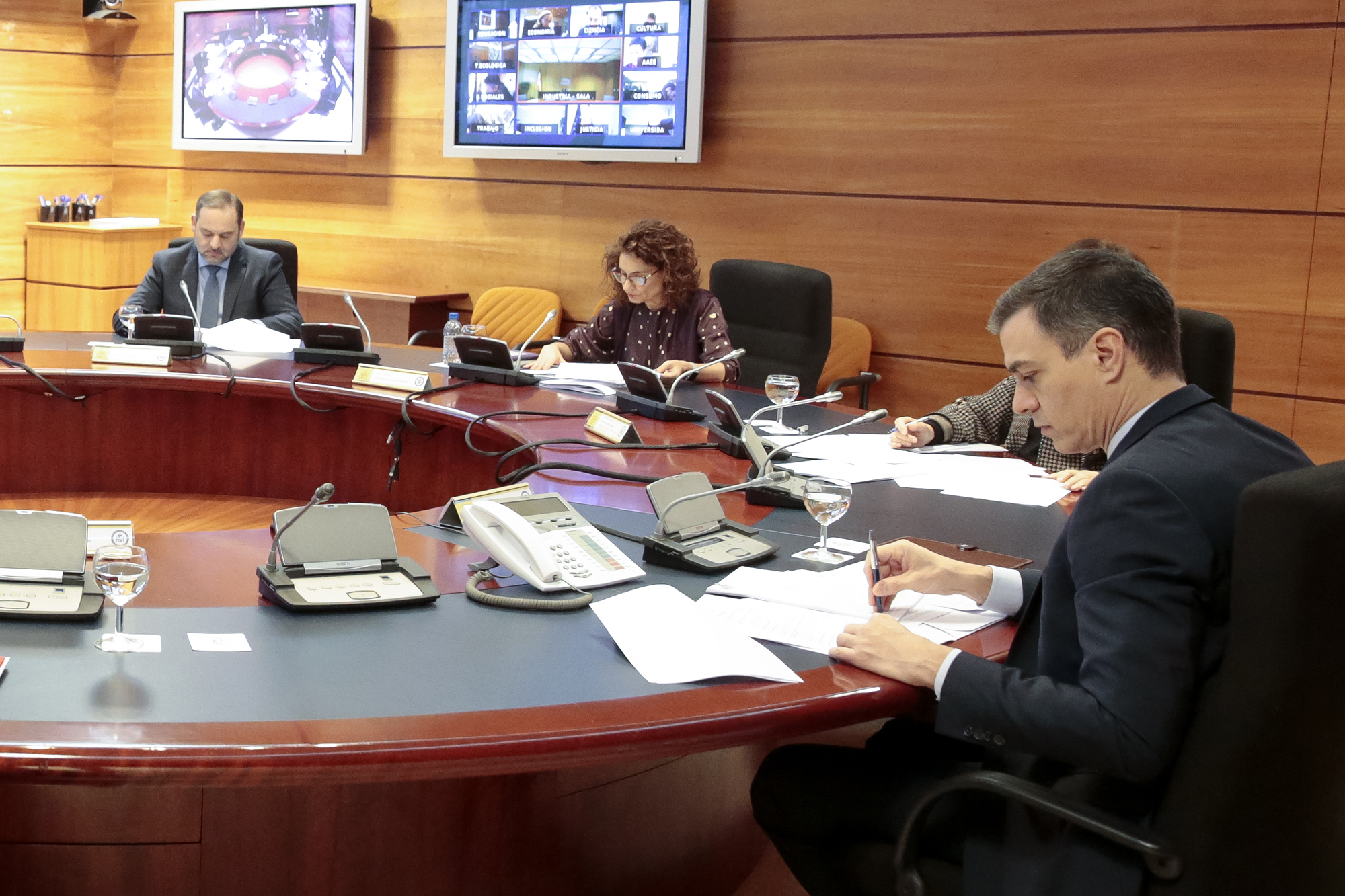
José Luis Ábalos (left), María Jesús Montero and Pedro Sánchez in March 2020

The Koldo Case, also known as the Ábalos Case, is a significant corruption scandal in Spain that emerged in early 2024. The investigation, initially centered on illegal commissions from COVID-19 mask procurement contracts, later expanded to include alleged rigging of public works projects. In late 2025, the Spanish Supreme Court ordered the pretrial detention of former Transport Minister José Luis Ábalos and his advisor Koldo García on charges of bribery, money laundering, and membership in a criminal organization.

The scandal has significantly impacted the government of Pedro Sánchez, leading to the resignation of senior officials, including PSOE Organization Secretary Santos Cerdán in June 2025. The case has also been linked to other controversies, such as the "Delcygate" scandal and investigations into Sánchez's wife, Begoña Gómez, and his brother. In response to the scandals, opposition leaders have called for Sánchez's resignation and organized protests. Sánchez has apologized for the trust placed in those involved but has affirmed his intention to complete his term.

In November 2025, opposition leader Alberto Núñez Feijóo led tens of thousands of protesters in Madrid demanding Sánchez's resignation amid ongoing corruption investigations involving former ministers.

In 2025, Sánchez's Spanish Socialist Workers' Party (PSOE) was rocked by a series of sexual misconduct allegations that damaged its feminist branding. The scandal intensified in July 2025 when Salazar, a close advisor to Sánchez and a senior party official at the Moncloa Palace, resigned following allegations of sexual harassment by female employees. By December 2025, additional allegations surfaced against several other party figures, including the party leader in Torremolinos, the mayor of Belalcázar, the party's deputy secretary in the province of Valencia, and the president of the province of Lugo.

At his year-end press conference on 15 December 2025, Sánchez was accused of downplaying the impact of corruption and sexual misconduct allegations within the PSOE and his government, while insisting he would complete his term through 2027.

== Elections and government reshuffles during Sánchez's premiership ==
=== Second election and coalition ===
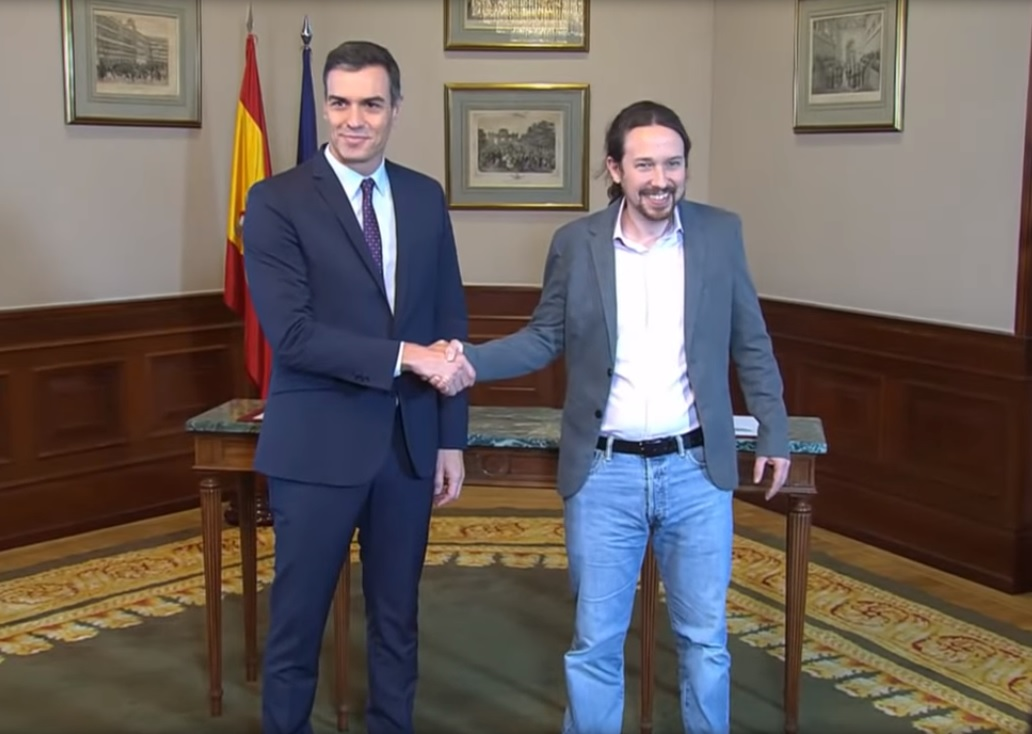
Sánchez and Iglesias announcing a tentative agreement for a "progressive" government (Palacio de las Cortes, 12 November 2019).

Despite electoral promises of Sánchez to not pact a government with Unidas Podemos, just following the results of the November 2019 Spanish general election, on 12 November 2019 Pedro Sánchez and Iglesias announced a preliminary agreement between PSOE and Unidas Podemos to rule together creating the first coalition government of the Spanish democracy, for all purposes a minority coalition as it did not enjoy a qualified majority at the Lower House, thus needing further support or abstention from other parliamentary forces in order to get through. On 7 January 2020, Pedro Sánchez earned a second mandate as prime minister after receiving a plurality of votes in the second round vote of his investiture at the Congress of Deputies. He was then once again sworn in as prime minister by King Felipe on 8 January. Soon after, Sánchez proceeded to form a new cabinet with 22 ministers and 4 vice-presidencies, the largest in Europe, and in the modern history of Spain, who assumed office on 13 January.

=== 2021 government reshuffle ===
On 10 July 2021, Sánchez announced a government reshuffle, effective on 12 July. A number of figures, considered political heavy-weights prior to the change, were outed, among them Carmen Calvo, José Luis Ábalos, Iván Redondo, and Juan Carlos Campo. The economic sector of government was not changed, and the minister of Economy Nadia Calviño was elevated to first deputy prime minister. A number of government seats were filled by regional PSOE cadres unknown to a wide audience prior to the reshuffle. The changes did not affect the UP sector of government.
