= Eckhard Janeba =

German economist and professor

Eckhard Janeba (born 1965) is a German economist and professor at the University of Mannheim. He is also a member of the Board of Academic Advisors to the Federal Ministry for Economic Affairs and Energy and member of the European Fiscal Board.

== Education ==
Janeba studied economics at the University of Kiel and Bonn. He obtained a Diploma degree in 1990 and received his Ph.D. in 1994, both from the University of Bonn.

== Career ==
From 1990 until 1994, Janeba was a member of the Collaborative Research Center (CRC) 303 at the University of Bonn. After obtaining his Ph.D., he took up a position as Assistant Professor of Economics at Indiana University at Bloomington in the US, which he held from 1994 to 1999. Afterwards, he worked as Assistant Professor of Economics and International Affairs at the University of Colorado at Boulder, where he received tenure and became an associate professor in 2003.

In 2004 he joined the University of Mannheim, where he currently holds the Chair in Public Finance and Economic Policy.

Since 2007 he is a member of the Board of Academic Advisors to the Federal Ministry for Economic Affairs and Energy. From 2023 until 2025 he held the role of the deputy chairman.

Additionally, he served as the chairman of the Independent Advisory Board to the German Stability Council from 2013 until 2018, which assesses compliance with the Fiscal Compact in Germany and the national implementation of the European Fiscal Compact.

In parallel to his academic position, Janeba is affiliated with the CESifo Research Network, and the Oxford University Centre for Business Taxation. Since 2008 he is also a research associate at the ZEW Mannheim.

== Research ==
Janeba's main fields of interest in research include:

- Tax Competition and Fiscal Federalism
- Foreign Direct Investment
- Trade and Income Inequality

His research has appeared in a range of academic journals such as the American Economic Review, European Economic Review, Journal of Public Economics, Journal of International Economics and Economic Journal.
