= Stabilitätsrat =

Joint body of the German Federation and the federal states

Stability Council (Stabilitätsrat)
- Formation: 2009
- Purpose: 'Independent' analysis of the public finances ahead of the budget
- Location: Detlev-Rohwedder-Haus Wilhelmstraße 97, 10117 Berlin
- Region served: Germany
- Chairman: Wolfgang Schäuble / Norbert Walter-Borjans
- Website: www.stabilitaetsrat.de/EN/Home/home_node.html

The Stabilitätsrat (Stability Council) is a joint body of the German Federation (Bund) and the federal states (Länder). It was established in 2010 as part of the second stage of Germany's federal reforms and is enshrined in Article 109a of the Basic Law (Grundgesetz), Germany's constitution. The Stability Council strengthens the institutional framework for safeguarding the long-term sustainability of public budgets on the federal and Länder levels.

== History ==
In 2010, the Stability Council replaced the Finanzplanungsrat (Financial Planning Council), founded in 1969.

== Legal Basis ==
The legal basis of the Stability Council is set out in Article 109a of the Basic Law. Its work is also governed by provisions in a number of other laws, including the Stability Council Act, the Consolidation Assistance Act, the Financial Equalisation Act and the Budgetary Principles Act.

== Organisation ==
The Stability Council is composed of the Federal Minister of Finance, the Länder finance ministers and the Federal Minister for Economic Affairs and Energy. The Federal Minister of Finance and the chair of the Länder Finance Minister Conference co-chair the Stability Council.

== Tasks ==
The Stability Council's main task is to monitor the budgets of the Federation and Länder. The council's purpose is the early identification of coming budgetary emergencies so that appropriate counter-measures can be initiated in a timely manner. The Stability Council plays an important role with regard to compliance with the EU requirements for budgetary discipline. The Council monitors the budgets of the Federation, Länder, local authorities and social insurance funds, to make sure that they, comply with the upper limit for the general government structural deficit of 0.5% of GDP, as stipulated in the Budgetary Principles Act.

== Advisory board ==
The Stability Council advisory board is an independent body of experts. It assists the Stability Council in carrying out its task of monitoring compliance with the upper limit on the general government structural deficit. It represents Germany in the EU Independent Fiscal Institutions Network set up by the EU in September 2015.

== See also ==
- Unabhängiger Beirat des Stabilitätsrats, the advisory board of the Stability Council
