= European Fiscal Board =

Independent advisory body of the European Commission

The European Fiscal Board (EFB) is an independent advisory body of the European Commission concerned with the implementation and future development of the European Union's fiscal framework. It evaluates how the framework has been applied, advises on the overall fiscal stance of the eurozone, and may advise the Commission and the Council of the European Union on the implementation of the Stability and Growth Pact.

The Board was first established in 2015 and began operating in 2016, following a recommendation in the 2015 Five Presidents' Report on completing the Economic and Monetary Union of the European Union. A new legal basis adopted in 2024 expanded its advisory role under the reformed EU economic-governance framework.

== History ==
The Five Presidents' Report was prepared by then-President of the European Commission Jean-Claude Juncker, in cooperation with the presidents of the European Council, the Eurogroup, the European Central Bank and the European Parliament. It proposed the creation of a European fiscal board to provide a public and independent assessment of the implementation of the EU fiscal framework and of the fiscal stance at both national and euro-area level.

The Commission established the Board through Decision (EU) 2015/1937 of 21 October 2015. It became operational in October 2016, with Danish economist Niels Thygesen as its first chair. The Commission amended the original decision in 2016 and again in 2022, when the maximum duration of members' mandates was changed.

The EU fiscal framework was revised in April 2024. Commission Decision (EU) 2024/2115 subsequently repealed the Board's original founding decision and established a new mandate. The decision gave the EFB a more prominent role in multilateral fiscal surveillance, provided for consultation of the European Parliament and the Council over appointments, and formalised its access to information through working arrangements with the Commission and the Council. A new five-member Board began work in April 2025.

== Mandate and activities ==
Under its 2024 mandate, the Board advises the Commission and the Council on their functions in multilateral fiscal surveillance. Its principal tasks are to:

- provide a timely retrospective evaluation of the implementation of the EU fiscal-governance framework;
- assess the prospective fiscal stance appropriate for the eurozone as a whole and the national fiscal stances consistent with it;
- advise, when requested by the Commission or the Council, on the application of the Stability and Growth Pact, including the possible extension of its general escape clause;
- cooperate with national independent fiscal institutions and promote exchanges of good practice; and
- make proposals concerning the future development of the fiscal framework.

The EFB publishes annual reports evaluating the implementation of the fiscal framework and separate assessments of the prospective euro-area fiscal stance. Its reports may also address the design of fiscal rules and the operation of national independent fiscal institutions. Since 2019, its secretariat has maintained a compliance tracker that records whether national budget balances, debt ratios and expenditure developed in line with the numerical requirements of the Stability and Growth Pact. The tracker distinguishes this quantitative assessment from the legal assessment of compliance, which may involve interpretation and discretionary margins.

During the economic disruption caused by the COVID-19 pandemic, the Board supported activating the Pact's general escape clause, which allowed temporary departures from the normal budgetary requirements. The Board has also proposed reforms intended to simplify the EU fiscal framework, including greater reliance on expenditure rules and a medium-term debt anchor.

== Organisation ==
The Board consists of a chair and four members selected from internationally recognised experts in public finance and macroeconomics. They are appointed by the Commission for three-year terms, renewable once, after the proposed appointments have been submitted to the European Parliament and the Council for consultation. Members are required to act independently and may not seek or accept instructions from EU institutions, national governments or other public or private bodies.

The Board seeks to adopt advice by consensus; if consensus cannot be reached, it decides by a simple majority, with the chair holding a casting vote. Its meetings are not public, but its reports and advice must be published, and it reports annually on its activities to the European Parliament, the Council and the Commission.

The EFB is supported by a dedicated secretariat that provides analytical, statistical and administrative assistance. Although it works under the Board's instructions, the secretariat is administratively attached to the Secretariat-General of the European Commission. Its head is appointed by the Commission after consultation with the chair.

=== Membership ===
The Board serving since April 2025 comprises:

- Pieter Hasekamp (Netherlands), chair;
- Eckhard Janeba (Germany);
- George Kopits (Hungary);
- Benedicta Marzinotto (Italy); and
- Lucía Rodríguez Muñoz (Spain).

The inaugural Board was chaired by Niels Thygesen from 2016 to 2025.

== Institutional position and assessment ==
The Board provides economic assessments and advice but does not replace the Commission or the Council in determining whether member states legally comply with EU fiscal rules. The European Court of Auditors described its role as forming an economic rather than a legal judgement on the appropriate fiscal stance at national and euro-area level.

The institutional relationship between the EFB and the Commission has been debated since the Board's creation. In 2019, the European Court of Auditors noted that members were appointed by the Commission, that the Board did not have its own budget or control over its personnel, and that its secretariat formed part of the Commission's Secretariat-General. Academic analysis has contrasted the Commission-based model with proposals for a stand-alone institution and has discussed whether the Board should primarily provide independent scrutiny or coordinate the work of national fiscal councils. The 2024 decision retained the secretariat within the Commission while introducing consultation of the Parliament and Council on appointments and requiring working arrangements governing access to information.

== See also ==
- EU Independent Fiscal Institutions Network
- European Semester
