= José Luis Escrivá =

Spanish economist

The Most Excellent José Luis Escrivá
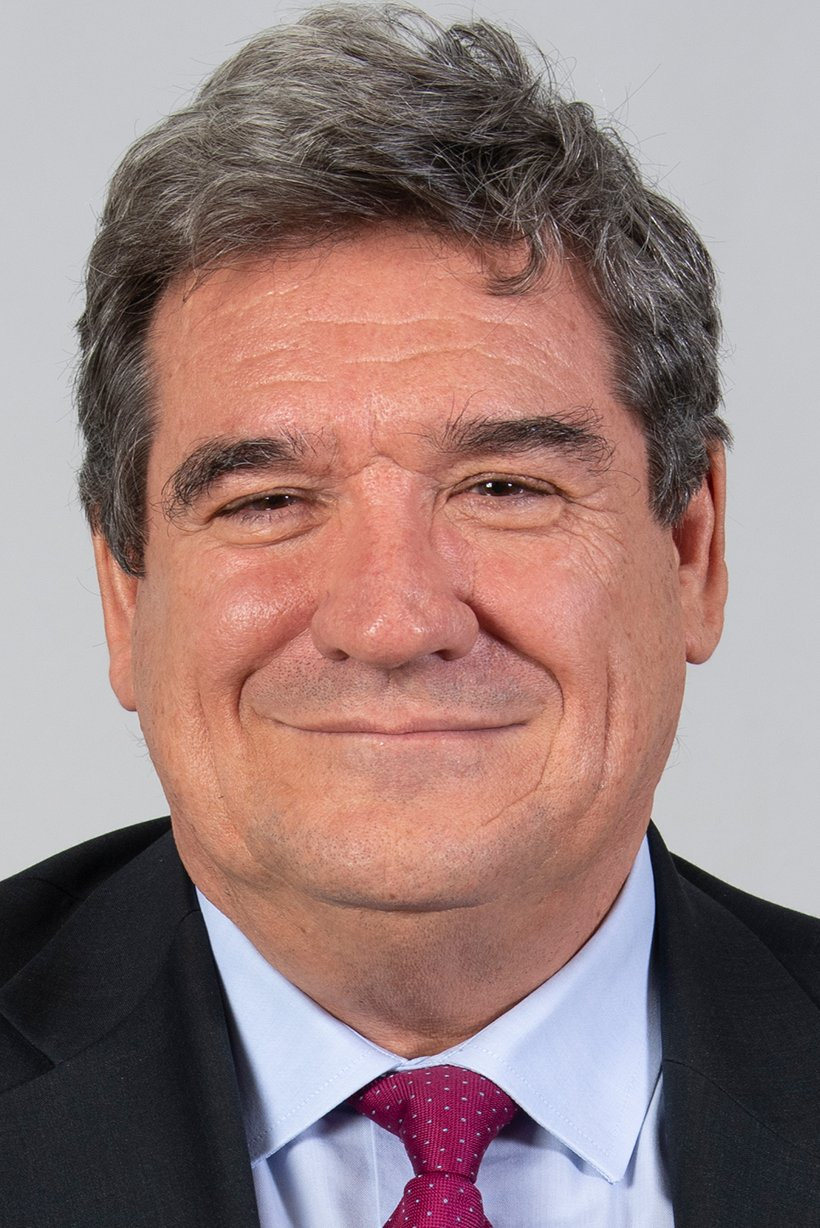
- Official portrait, 2023

71st Governor of the Bank of Spain
- Incumbent
- Assumed office 6 September 2024
- Preceded by: Pablo Hernández de Cos

Minister for Digital Transformation and Civil Service (Note: Minister of Digital Transformation until December 2023)
- In office 21 November 2023 – 6 September 2024
- Prime Minister: Pedro Sánchez
- Preceded by: Nadia Calviño (Digital Transformation); María Jesús Montero (Civil Service)
- Succeeded by: Óscar López Águeda

Minister of Inclusion, Social Security and Migration
- In office 13 January 2020 – 21 November 2023
- Prime Minister: Pedro Sánchez
- Preceded by: Magdalena Valerio (Labour, Migration and Social Security)
- Succeeded by: Elma Saiz

Chairman of the Independent Authority for Fiscal Responsibility
- In office 22 February 2014 – 13 January 2020
- Monarch: Felipe VI
- Prime Minister: Mariano Rajoy (2014–2018); Pedro Sánchez (2018–2020)
- Preceded by: Office established
- Succeeded by: Cristina Herrero

Chairman of the EU Independent Fiscal Institutions Network
- In office 24 September 2015 – 7 November 2019
- Preceded by: Office established
- Succeeded by: Seamus Coffey

Personal details
- Born: José Luis Escrivá Belmonte; 12 May 1960 (age 66) Albacete, Spain
- Party: Independent
- Spouse: María del Carmen García de la Osa
- Children: 2
- Education: Complutense University of Madrid
- Occupation: Economist • Politician
- Awards: Bachelor's Degree Extraordinary Award

José Luis Escrivá Belmonte (pronounced [xoseˈlwis eskɾiˈβa]; born 5 December 1960) is a Spanish economist currently serving as governor of the Bank of Spain since 2024. Previously, he served as minister of Digital Transformation and Civil Service and as minister of Inclusion, Social Security and Migration, both under Pedro Sánchez.

Before entering in politics, Escrivá had important roles in the Spanish and European fiscal oversight bodies, such as Spain's Independent Authority for Fiscal Responsibility (2014–2020) and the European Union Independent Fiscal Institutions Network (2015–2019). Likewise, he has served as Head of the Monetary Policy Division of the European Central Bank (1999–2004) and as Chief Representative for the Americas at the Basel-based Bank for International Settlements (2012–2014).

In the private sector, Escrivá worked from 2004 to 2012 at the BBVA banking group, first as its global Chief-Economist and Director of the Research Department, and from 2010 as the Managing Director responsible for Global Public Finance.

== Early years and education ==
Escrivá was born in Albacete, Spain on December 5, 1960. At the age of 18 he moved to the city of Madrid to continue his university education. He graduated in Economic Sciences by the Complutense University of Madrid and it was awarded with the Extraordinary Prize of Degree. He's married and has two children.

=== Career as an economist ===
He started his career in the Bank of Spain, where he served in many positions within the Bank's Studies Services. He activately participated in the European Union, where he participated in the monetary union since 1993 as advisor of the European Monetary Institute. With the creation of the Monetary Union, he was appointed as Head of the Monetary Policy Division of the European Central Bank, in Frankfurt. Between 2012 and 2014 he was Chief Representative for the Americas in the Bank for International Settlements

Between 2004 and 2012, Escrivá worked in the BBVA Group, first as chief economist and Director of the Research Department and as Managing Director of the Public Finance Area later.

=== Chairman of AIReF and EU IFIs ===
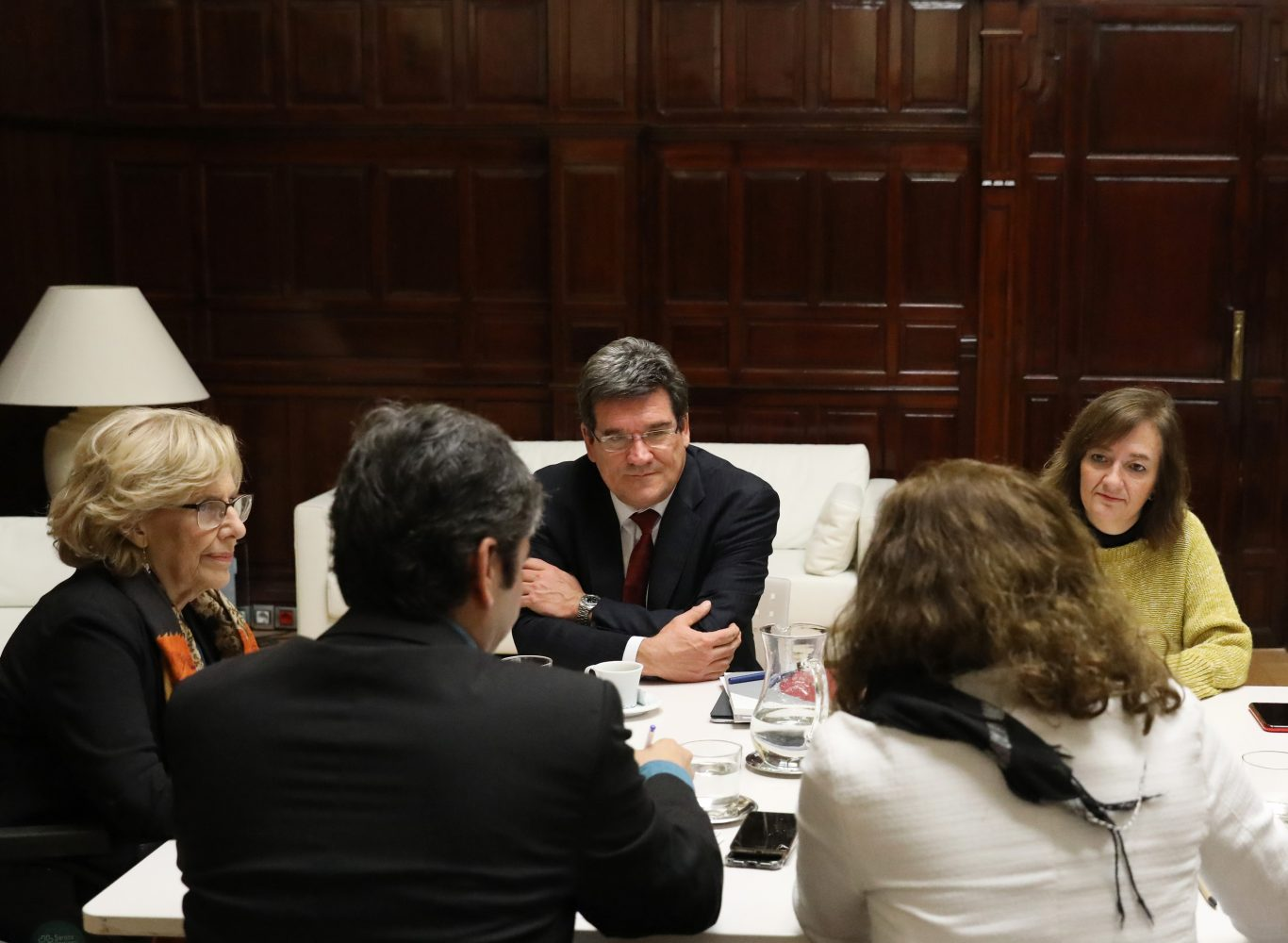
José Luis Escrivá at a work meeting with the mayor of Madrid, Manuela Carmena, in his time as chair of AIReF

In early 2014, the conservative government of Mariano Rajoy nominated him as the first chairman of the Independent Authority for Fiscal Responsibility (AIReF) of Spain. The Finance Committee of the Congress of Deputies confirmed his appointment in February 2014. The AIReF was created that year by the Spanish government at the behest of the European Union for the audit of public accounts. He remained in post until January 2020, when he was appointed as minister.

In November 2015 he was appointed as the first chair of the EU Independent Fiscal Institutions Network, a newly created institution to exchange views, expertise and pool resources in areas of common concern between all the independent fiscal oversight bodies operating in the European Union. He was re-elected in November 2017 and ended its second term in November 2019, when the Network elected Seamus Coffey to replace him.

Spain’s government proposed Digital Transformation Minister Jose Luis Escriva as the next central bank governor, but the opposition People’s Party (PP) rejected the nomination. Economy Minister Carlos Cuerpo postponed the announcement and emphasized ongoing negotiations to reach an agreement. The acting governor, Margarita Delgado, can attend but not vote in European Central Bank meetings.

== Minister of Social Security ==
On January 10, 2020, it was announced that he would be appointed as the first head of the Ministry of Inclusion, Social Security and Migration, a newly created department that assumed the functions of the former Ministry of Labour, Migrations and Social Security in everything related to the Social Security Administration and government policies on migration and social inclusion.

He was officially appointed by King Felipe VI on January 13. That day, he was sworn in by the Sovereign. At the same time, he ceased as chairman of AIReF.

The minister addressed the Committee on Labour, Inclusion, Social Security and Migration of the Congress of Deputies for the first time on February 27, 2020, where he explained the general lines of his department's policy. In his speech, he explained that the management of his department would rotate around three main areas: pensions —guaranteeing a sufficient and sustainable pension system—, inclusion policies —establishing new inclusive policies that reduce inequality, uncertainty and social exclusion— and migration —a new legal framework to order and guarantee the migrant— all of them, said the minister, seeking a broad consensus.

One of the measures that the minister proposed in said committee regarding inclusion was the design of a minimum vital income. This is, said the minister in his appearance, the most relevant policy that will be carried out by the new General Secretariat for Social Inclusion and Social Security Objectives and Policies, a department of new creation.

=== Minimum Vital Income ===
Due to the COVID-19 pandemic that strongly affected Spain, the works around this new vital minimum income were sped up, a measure also supported by the partner of the government coalition, Unidas Podemos. Minister Escrivá stated, in April 2020, that the last fringes were being finalized, and that the minimum income —which will be permanent— would be approved in May and would benefit approximately 3 million people. After a year since its approval, it has reached 210,000 houses, where 565,000 people live and where the average Minimum Living Income benefit is 458.51 euros.

The minimum income, designed by the Ministry of Inclusion, Social Security and Migration through the National Institute for Social Security and the General Secretariat for Objectives and Policies of Social Inclusion and Forecast, and with the collaboration of the Spanish Tax Agency and the Ministry of Social Rights and 2030 Agenda, was finally approved by the Council of Ministers on May 29.

=== Taxation of Self-Employment ===
Escrivá is responsible for preparations of social security tax changes for self-employed workers. In July 2022, after 14 months of negotiations, the minister reached a deal with self-employed associations to modify the fees for this kind of workers. The new scheme establishes for 2025 a minimum fee of 200 EUR / month for self-workers earning at least 670 EUR / month and a maximum fee of 590 EUR / month for those earning more than 6,000 EUR / month. With these reform, those self-workers that not reach the official minimum wage, the fees will reduce, while those with more earnings will increase. Due to this, it is expected that self-employed workers earning above 1,700 EUR / month will see their social security contributions increased up to twice in the next three years. Some economists evaluate these changes as government attempts to temporarily patch disequilibriums in the unsustainable Spanish public pensions system, at the cost of self-employed workers.

Another relevant point is the probable breach of the commitments with the European Union, since with this reform it was hoped to reduce the Spanish social security deficit, but this reform does not guarantee it.

== Governor of the Bank of Spain ==
In September 2024, he was appointed governor of the Bank of Spain.
