= EU Independent Fiscal Institutions Network =

European Union institution

- Formation: September 2015
- Location: Place du Congrès 1, Brussels (Belgium)
- Region served: European Union
- Chair: Richard van Zwol
- Website: https://www.euifis.eu

The EU Independent Fiscal Institutions Network (EU IFIs) is a voluntary and inclusive institution open to all independent fiscal oversight bodies operating in the EU. It provides a platform to exchange views, expertise and pool resources in areas of common concern. It was formally created in September 2015 following the meeting of EU fiscal oversight bodies.

The Network supports the efforts to review and reinforce the EU fiscal framework, seeking to better exploit the synergies between rules and institutions, as well as between different levels of administration whilst respecting the principle of subsidiarity and enhancing local ownership and accountability.

The network is currently headed by Sander van Veldhuizen, Chair of the CPB Netherlands Bureau for Economic Policy Analysis. The Secretariat is managed by the Centre for European Policy Studies (CEPS).

== Chairs ==
- José Luis Escrivá (2015–2019)
- Seamus Coffey (2019–2020)
- Sander van Veldhuizen (2020–2021)
- Richard van Zwol (2021–2024)
- Lilia Cavallari (2024- today)

== Participating bodies ==
Country	Institution	Executive	Website
Austria	Fiskalrat	Martin Kocher	https://www.fiskalrat.at/en/
Bulgaria	Fiscal Council of Bulgaria	Simeon Dyankov	http://fiscal-council.bg
Croatia	Fiscal Policy Commission	Grozdana Perić	https://www.sabor.hr/en/committees/commission-fiscal-policy-10-term
Cyprus	Cyprus Fiscal Council	Demetris Georgiades	http://www.fiscalcouncil.gov.cy/fiscalcouncil/fiscalcouncil.nsf/index_en/index_en?OpenDocument
Czech Republic	Czech Fiscal Council (Národní rozpočtová rada)	Eva Zamrazilová	https://unrr.cz/
Denmark	Danish Economic Council	John Smidt	http://www.dors.dk/english
Estonia	Estonian Fiscal Council	Raul Eamets	http://eelarvenoukogu.ee/en
Finland	Economic Policy Council	Roope Uusitalo	https://www.talouspolitiikanarviointineuvosto.fi/en/home/
Finland	National Audit Office of Finland (NAOF)	Matti Okko	https://www.vtv.fi/en
France	High Council of Public Finances	Nicolas Carnot	http://www.hcfp.fr/
Germany	Independent Advisory Board of the Stability Council (Germany)	Thiess Büttner	https://www.stabilitaetsrat.de/EN/Home/home_node.html
Greece	Fiscal Council	Anastasia Miaouli	https://www.hfisc.gr/en
Greece	Parliamentary Budget Office	Franciscos Koutentakis	http://www.pbo.gr/Default.aspx?alias=www.pbo.gr/pbo/en&
Hungary	Fiscal Council of Hungary	Árpád Kovács	http://www.parlament.hu/web/koltsegvetesi-tanacs/in-english
Ireland	Irish Fiscal Advisory Council	Sebastian Barnes	http://www.fiscalcouncil.ie/
Italy	Parliamentary Budget Office (UPB)	Giuseppe Pisauro	http://www.upbilancio.it/
Latvia	Fiscal Discipline Council	Inna Steinbuka	http://fiscalcouncil.lv/council
Lithuania	National Audit Office	Arūnas Dulkys	http://www.vkontrole.lt/bp/defaultEN.aspx
Luxembourg	Conseil National des Finances Publiques	Romain Bausch	https://cnfp.public.lu/en.html
Malta	Malta Fiscal Advisory Council	John Cassar White	https://mfac.org.mt/
Netherlands	CPB Netherlands Bureau for Economic Policy Analysis	Jeroen Hinloopen	http://www.cpb.nl/en
Netherlands	Dutch Council of State - Raad van State	Thom de Graaf	https://www.raadvanstate.nl/talen/artikel/
Poland	No fiscal council established		
Portugal	Conselho das Finanças Públicas, Portuguese Public Finance Council	Nazaré da Costa Cabral	https://www.cfp.pt/
Romania	Romanian Fiscal Council	Daniel Dăianu	http://www.fiscalcouncil.ro/
Slovakia	Council for Budget Responsibility	Ivan Šramko	http://www.rozpoctovarada.sk/eng/home
Spain	Independent Authority for Fiscal Responsibility (AIReF)	Cristina Herrero	http://www.airef.es/?locale=en
Sweden	Swedish Fiscal Policy Council	Lars Heikensten	http://www.finanspolitiskaradet.se/english/swedishfiscalpolicycouncil/abouttheswedishfpc.4.6f04e222115f0dd09ea8000950.html

== See also ==
- Parliamentary Budget Office (Australia)
- Court of Audit (Belgium)
- Parliamentary Budget Officer (Canada)
- National Assembly Budget Office (Korea)
- Congressional Budget Office (United States)
- CPB Netherlands Bureau for Economic Policy Analysis (Netherlands)
- Independent Authority for Fiscal Responsibility (Spain)
- Office for Budget Responsibility (United Kingdom)
