= Fiscal Council of Hungary =

Official watchdog

Agency overview
- Formed: 2008
- Jurisdiction: National Assembly (Hungary)
- Agency executive: Árpád Kovács
- Website: Official website

The Fiscal Council of Hungary (Költségvetési Tanács) is an independent fiscal oversight body tasked by Hungary's Parliament to oversee the state budget process in Hungary. It was established in 2008 by Act LXXV of 2008 and its tasks have been expanded by Act CXCIV of 2011.

The council is to promote the "creation and maintenance of the discipline, transparency and long-term sustainability of fiscal policy and to foster the long-term competitiveness of Hungary through fiscal means, in consideration of the requirement of justice between present and future generations and the expected growth of public expenditures owing to the aging of society in the forthcoming decades".

In 2010, the Fiscal Council's budget was cut from 835 million forints to 10 million (US$49,000), thereby practically killing it off. The government of the day cut the budget in response to the head of the Fiscal Council highlighting an anomaly in government plans for crisis taxes. Prime Minister Viktor Orbán had stated crisis taxes would remain in effect until January 1, 2013. The head of the Fiscal Council, György Kopits, drew attention to a clause in the 2011 budget according to which the taxes would be in place until the end of 2014, although with reduced revenue targets.
