= Unabhängiger Beirat des Stabilitätsrats =

Independent body of experts

Advisory Board to the Stability Council (Unabhängiger Beirat des Stabilitätsrats)
- Formation: 2013
- Purpose: 'Independent' analysis of the public finances ahead of the budget
- Location: Detlev-Rohwedder-Haus Wilhelmstraße 97, 10117 Berlin
- Region served: Germany
- Chairman: Eckhard Janeba
- Website: www.stabilitaetsrat.de/EN/Beirat/Beirat_node.html

The Unabhängiger Beirat des Stabilitätsrats (Advisory Board to the Stability Council) is an independent body of experts that assists the Stabilitätsrat (Stability Council) in monitoring compliance with the upper limit on the general government structural deficit set out in the Budgetary Principles Act. The board produces statements and recommendations in this context that lay the foundation for the work of the Stability Council. The chair of the advisory board participates in Stability Council discussions on monitoring the general government structural deficit limit and communicates the board's opinion.

The advisory board was set up as part of Germany's national implementation of the European Fiscal Compact. The board convened for the first time on 5 December 2013.

== Chair and members ==
The advisory board's members include: one representative each from the Deutsche Bundesbank and the Sachverständigenrat zur Begutachtung der gesamtwirtschaftlichen Entwicklung (German Council of Economic Experts); one representative from the research institutes involved in preparing the Joint Economic Forecast; four experts appointed for a period of five years by representatives of the Federation and Länder on the Stability Council; and two experts appointed for a period of five years by the national associations of local authorities and the national organisations of the social security funds.

== Task ==
In line with section 7 subsection (3) of the Stability Council Act, the advisory board expresses its opinion on matters involving compliance with the upper limit on the general government structural deficit as defined in the Budgetary Principles Act. If necessary, the board makes recommendations for measures to eliminate excessive deficits. The board's statements and recommendations as well as other relevant documents are published here. The board itself determines whether and which documents are published.

== International coordination ==
The independent advisory board to the Stability Council is part of the EU Network of Independent Fiscal Institutions (EU IFIs).

== See also ==
- EU Independent Fiscal Institutions Network
