= Parliamentary Budget Office =

Australian parliament financial advisors

Agency overview
- Formed: July 23, 2012; 14 years ago
- Jurisdiction: Parliament of Australia
- Headquarters: Canberra
- Agency executive: Sam Reinhardt, Parliamentary Budget Officer
- Website: pbo.gov.au

The Parliamentary Budget Office (PBO) is an agency of the Australian Parliament whose purpose is to "inform the parliament by providing independent and non-partisan analysis of the budget cycle, fiscal policy and the financial implications of proposals". It was established by the Gillard government following minority government formation negotiations. Following that commitment, a Joint Parliamentary Committee on the Parliamentary Budget Office was convened, chaired by John Faulkner. The PBO's independence is enshrined in legislation.

In 2013, Treasurer Wayne Swan introduced legislation requiring the PBO to conduct a post-election audit to cost political parties' electoral commitments.

In its first independent report, the PBO noted that the Australian federal budget had an underlying structural deficit, caused in part by Howard government personal income tax cuts.

== See also ==
- Parliamentary Budget Advisory Service (South Australia)
- Legislative Analyst's Office (California)
- Congressional Budget Office (United States)
- Bureau for Economic Policy Analysis (Netherlands)
- Parliamentary Budget Officer (Canada)
- National Assembly Budget Office (The Republic of Korea)
- Office for Budget Responsibility (United Kingdom)
