= Parliamentary Budget Advisory Service =

The Parliamentary Budget Advisory Service was established in South Australia in December 2017 to provide expertise to assist candidates in costing their campaign policies. It was an initiative of the Weatherill Government which preceded the 2018 South Australian election by three months.

== Confidentiality concerns ==
SA Greens MLC Mark Parnell said that he suspected his party, the Greens was the only party to make use of the service in the lead up to the 2018 South Australian election. Representatives of the Liberal Party, Nick Xenophon's SA Best party and independent Robert Brokenshire expressed concerns that they believed that the confidentiality of their policies may be at risk of being leaked to Labor if they were to use the office's services. Rob Lucas described the context as "an increasingly politicised public service".

At 30 January 2018, the Parliamentary Budget Advisory Service had received 22 submissions which The Advertiser understood to be "mostly from the Greens".

== Staff ==
The office is led by former Deputy Under Treasurer John Thomas Hill, who is able to second staff from across Government. Hill retired from his position as Deputy Under Secretary in 2002 after 37 years of service to the Department of Treasury and Finance. In 2001 he received a Public Service Medal for "outstanding public service in the field of public sector finance".
