= Independent Authority for Fiscal Responsibility =

The Independent Authority for Fiscal Responsibility (Autoridad Independiente de Responsabilidad Fiscal, AIReF) is an independent agency for fiscal control in Spain. It was created in 2013 by the Spanish government, on the initiative of the European Union and to implement a constitutional mandate.

The purpose of the Authority for Fiscal Responsibility is to oversee the sustainability of public finances as a means for ensuring economic growth and the wellbeing of Spanish society in the medium and long-term. It has its own legal personality and full public and private capacity. It carries out its functions autonomously and independently from the General Government and acts objectively, transparently and impartially.

AIReF was set up in 2013 (13 years ago) in implementation of the constitutional mandate set out in Article 135. On November 14, 2013, Organic Law 6/2013, on the establishment of the Spanish Independent Authority for Fiscal Responsibility, was approved. In June 2014, it began its activity.

Its mission is to ensure that the General Government effectively complies with the budget stability principle set out in Article 135 of the Spanish Constitution through ongoing monitoring of the budget cycle, public borrowing and the analysis of economic forecasts. In 2021, it incorporated the evaluation of public expenditure as one of its permanent functions, with the aim of assisting in the development of more effective and efficient policies in favour of citizens.

It belongs to the Network of European Union Independent Fiscal Institutions, created in 2015, as well as the Network of Parliamentary Budget Officials and Independent Fiscal Institutions of the OECD.

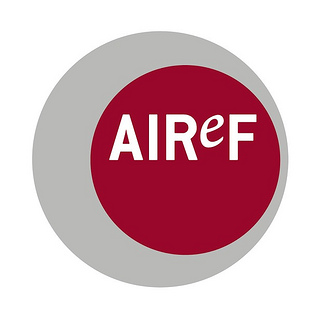
AIReF logo

== History ==
The creation of Independent Fiscal Institutions (IFIs) such as AIReF began in the middle of the 20th century. The Netherlands created the first IFI in 1947. A few years later, other countries such as Denmark and Germany took the step and, somewhat later, the United States, Belgium, Austria, South Korea, Sweden and Canada also established IFIs.

AIReF, the Spanish IFI, was set up in 2013 as a result of Organic Law 6/2013. The reform of the fiscal framework after the euro crisis led to the proliferation of Independent Fiscal Institutions at a European level. They were created with the aim of generating more accurate macroeconomic forecasts at a country level and to prevent, as had happened in previous years, optimistic forecasts generating higher than expected deficits. The supervision of compliance with national and European fiscal rules by the different Euro Area countries is the other major mission entrusted to Independent Fiscal Institutions, with the aim of ensuring the sustainability of public finances.

=== Presidency ===
In February 2014, José Luis Escrivá was appointed as the first President of the institution, after the Finance Committee of the Congress of Deputies accepted the proposal submitted by the Government. In March 2014, AIReF’s Organic Statute was approved and the rest of the Steering Committee was incorporated over the second quarter of the year. The committee met for the first time in June 2014. The work of the institution effectively began at that time.

In March 2020, the Government approved the appointment of Cristina Herrero as the new President of AIReF, after the Finance Committee of the Congress of Deputies unanimously accepted her candidacy.

In March 2026, the third government of Pedro Sánchez nominated Inés Olóndriz de Moraga, Secretary-General for Regional and Local Financing in the Ministry of Finance, as president. Her appointment was controversial, given her senior government position, which she was supposed to oversee, and was criticized by both former President Herrero and the opposition parties. Ultimately, it received the approval of the relevant Congress of Deputies committee, although the People's Party and Vox parties voted against it, and Junts abstained, calling the process a "circus".

== Values ==
=== Independence ===
AIReF operates with full organic and functional independence to carry out its purpose. Such independence is the prerequisite for the success of its mission. Neither the President nor the members of its governing bodies or any other member of AIReF's staff may request or accept instructions from any public or private entity.

=== Transparency ===
AIReF provides the public with all the relevant information on its Reports, Opinions and Studies, as well as the basis for such analyses, in an open manner. The institution discloses the methodology and criteria underpinning its Reports, Opinions and Studies in collaboration with the different General Government sub-sectors and international organisations.

=== Accountability ===
By law, the President of AIReF must appear, at least once a year, in Parliament to report on the institution's activity, although AIReF itself promotes greater frequency on its own initiative. In addition, AIReF is subject to review by the General State Comptroller (Spanish acronym: IGAE) and the Spanish Court of Auditors. The Institution also undergoes regular external evaluations on the performance of its functions, its governance and its organisational structure. Its multi-year activity is framed in a strategic plan that is reflected year by year in an action plan. AIReF issues its annual report on its activities during the previous year.

== Structure ==
=== Presidency ===
AIReF's current President is Cristina Herrero, the second person to hold the office. She was appointed by Royal Decree 439/2020, of March 3rd, after receiving the unanimous vote in favour of the Finance Committee of the Congress of Deputies.

The President has a six-year non-renewable term of office. The President of AIReF is appointed by the Council of Ministers on a proposal from the Minister for Finance and Civil Service. Prior to the appointment, the nominee must appear before the corresponding Parliamentary Committee, which must endorse the proposal by an absolute majority. Should the Committee fail to accept the nominee within 15 days, a majority vote cast by the corresponding Senate Committee would suffice.

=== Divisions ===
In addition to the Presidency, AIReF is made up of four divisions around which all of the Institution's work is organised:

- Budget Analysis Division
- Economic Analysis Division
- Legal Affairs Division
- Public Spending Evaluation Division, created in 2021

The President and directors of each division make up the Steering Committee of AIReF. The Presidency also has a Technical Cabinet to coordinate the work of the different divisions and carry out an open communication policy that provides the public with direct access to AIReF's work.

=== Technical team ===
The staff employed by AIReF are, in general, career civil servants of the General Government, although they can also be personnel from national or international organisations with economic, fiscal, budgetary or financial control or analysis functions. AIReF has no temporary or "freely designated" staff.

=== Advisory Board ===
AIReF's Advisory Board is set within the framework of Organic Law 6/2013, on the establishment of AIReF, which lays down that the President may be advised in the exercise of their duties by professionals in the field of the matters pertaining to the institution. It is exclusively a deliberative and advisory body of AIReF.

In March 2021, this Advisory Board was renewed and is currently composed of nine national and international experts of recognised prestige in budgetary, economic and financial analysis. The new directors, appointed for two-year renewable terms, are as follows:

Javier Andrés, Samuel Bentolila, Antonio Cabrales, Olga Cantó, Álvaro Escribano, Beatriz González López-Valcárcel, Eckhard Janeba, Francisco Pedraja and Eva Senra.

== AIReF’s Activity ==
AIReF's core activity is the preparation of Reports, Opinions and Studies on the matters covered by the Organic Law establishing the institution.

=== Reports ===
AIReF issues the Reports provided for in Chapter II of Organic Law 6/2013. In these reports, it analyses the evolution of the budget cycle and compliance with fiscal rules by the Central Government, the Social Security, Autonomous Regions (ARs) and Local Governments (LGs). Such reports may contain recommendations, which are subject to the "comply or explain" principle, so that the recipient administration must either commit itself to compliance or explain why it departs from those recommendations.

=== Opinions ===
Within the scope of its powers (monitoring of the budget cycle and long-term sustainability of public finances) and pursuant to Article 23 of its Organic Law, AIReF issues Opinions on its own initiative. In addition, AIReF issues legally-mandated opinions, such as the opinion on the Minimum Living Income (Article 31.3 of the MLI Act). On other occasions, the law enables AIReF to issue opinions on matters not included in Article 23 of its Organic Law, as is the case of Article 344.4 of the General Social Security Act, which allows AIReF to issue opinions on the application by the Ministry of Labour, Migration and Social Security of the financial system and the management of Social Security benefits, as well as on the financial sustainability of the system of protection for termination of activity. Any proposals or recommendations contained in the opinions are not subject to the "comply or explain" principle.

=== Studies ===
The studies are requested by Central Government, the Fiscal and Financial Council Policy, the National Commission for Local Administration or the Financial Commission of the Social Security. They may also be requested by the ARs and the LGs, provided that they refer to issues within their authority and do not affect any other public authority.

The predominant framework for drawing up these studies is set by the Spending Reviews (SRs), which originate from the commission made by the Government in the 2017–2020 Stability Programme Update, which in turn came from the European Commission. 11 studies in various areas of public spending such as healthcare, infrastructure, active employment policies and tax benefits result from the Spending Review 2018–2021.

The Spending Review 2022–2026, which is still in the stage of determining the focus and scope of the studies, represents the consolidation of this framework. Through Component 29 of the Recovery, Transformation and Resilience Plan (RTRP), Spain made a commitment to the European Commission to make this framework permanent and to extend its time horizon and make it asynchronous with the political cycle. This impetus also led to the creation of the Public Spending Evaluation Division in 2021.

== IFI network ==
AIReF is part of a network of Independent Fiscal Institutions (IFI's) in other European countries. The Network of EU Independent Fiscal Institutions was created in September 2015, following ratification of the Bratislava Agreement. At present, the Network currently has a total of 32 members and is chaired by Richard van Zwol, State Council at the Netherlands Council of State. Sebastian Barnes, acting chairman of the Irish Fiscal Council, is the vice-chairman.

Participation in the network of EU IFIs is voluntary and open to all EU IFIs. AIReF is a member of this Network, which aims to provide a platform in Europe to help IFIs effectively perform their functions, particularly those arising from the European Union's fiscal framework.

== Presidents ==
1. José Luis Escrivá (February 22, 2014 – January 13, 2020)
2. Cristina Herrero Sánchez (March 4, 2020 – March 4, 2026)
3. Inés Olóndriz de Moraga (April 1, 2026 – present)
