= Parliamentary Budget Officer =

Canadian government accountability agency

- Directeur parlementaire du budget
- Incumbent; Annette Ryan since April 22, 2026
- Abbreviation: PBO
- Reports to: Parliament of Canada
- Nominator: Prime Minister of Canada
- Appointer: Governor in Council
- Term length: 7 years; once renewable
- Constituting instrument: Parliament of Canada Act
- First holder: Kevin Page
- Salary: $174,700 - $205,500 (GCQ-6)
- Website: www.pbo-dpb.ca

Office of the Parliamentary Budget Officer
- Bureau du directeur parlementaire du budget

Agency overview
- Formed: 2006
- Headquarters: Ottawa, Ontario, Canada
- Employees: 40
- Annual budget: C$7.3 million (2012-20)

The Office of the Parliamentary Budget Officer (OPBO; French: Bureau du directeur parlementaire du budget) is an office of the Parliament of Canada which provides independent, authoritative and non-partisan financial and economic analysis. The office is led by the Parliamentary Budget Officer (PBO; French: Directeur parlementaire du budget), an independent officer who supports parliamentarians in carrying out their constitutional roles of scrutinizing the raising and spending of public monies and generally overseeing the government's activities.

== History ==
=== Creation of PBO (2006) ===
The Parliamentary Budget Officer was established in 2006 by the Conservative government of Prime Minister Stephen Harper, as one of the independent oversight offices established by the Federal Accountability Act. The act was the Harper government's first piece of legislation.

The powers of the PBO are enshrined in the Parliament of Canada Act (Sections 79.1-79.5). The PBO's mission is to "support Parliament in exercising its oversight role in the government’s stewardship of public funds by ensuring budget transparency and promoting informed public dialogue with an aim to implement sound economic and fiscal policies in Canada."

=== Conservative government (2006 to 2015) ===
In March 2011, the PBO published a 65-page peer-reviewed report that estimated the cost of buying F-35 fighter jets. The PBO estimated the full cost to be $29.3-billion, including upgrade costs of $3.9-billion, much higher than the $9-billion the Department of National Defence had publicly estimated. The Auditor General later reached a similar conclusion as the PBO. Harper said that he refused “to get into a lengthy debate on numbers.”

In February 2012, the PBO released an analysis of the projected cost over the next 70 years of benefits to the elderly. It concluded that those costs would rise for a number of years relative to GDP, then fall back very close to current levels (slightly less than 15 per cent of total federal program spending). This report contradicted the government's statement that Old Age Security was unsustainable.

In June 2012, Minister of Foreign Affairs John Baird said in Question Period that PBO Kevin Page had overstepped his mandate after Page sought a legal opinion on whether the PBO is entitled to all financial and economic data from federal departments, should it not be protected for privacy or confidentiality reasons.

In 2012, Page required 56 departments to detail savings and cost reduction measures they were undertaking, cuts which were required under that year's federal budget. A number of government departments refused to disclose the number of job cuts and how much service in each department would be affected. Some cabinet ministers, such as Minister of Finance Jim Flaherty and President of the Treasury Board Tony Clement refused to disclose their numbers, stating in October 2012 that the PBO was exceeding his office's mandate by requesting such information. Other members of Parliament defended the PBO, arguing that it is difficult to vote on a budget when details aren't known about how significant cuts will affect government services and programs. The PBO argued that it is his job to inform parliamentarians and the public about what a $5.2-billion cut will do to government. The PBO stated that it was prepared to take the issue to the Federal Court to attempt to force the government to comply.

In March 2013, after departing as PBO, Kevin Page said the Conservative government was sending a "very strong signal" that it's "moving to unwind the office."

During the 2015 federal election, both the Liberal Party and New Democratic Party promised to strengthen the PBO.

=== Liberal government (2015 to present) ===
The Liberal Party's 2015 election platform committed to making the PBO “truly independent of the government” and “accountable only – and directly – to Parliament”. The platform also committed to expand the PBO's mandate to include “the costing of party election platforms”. These changes were included in the Budget Implementation Act, 2017 and came into force in September 2017.

In March 2017, the PBO said that the budget only showed $5.5 billion of the planned $8 billion that was allocated to new infrastructure spending under Justin Trudeau's budget. The Liberals disputed some of the findings, with a Treasury Board spokesperson saying that the problems arose from confusion surrounding the budget process.

The nomination of Annette Ryan in 2026 was opposed by Conservatives and the Bloc Québécois.

== Office of the Parliamentary Budget Officer ==
The Office of the Parliamentary Budget Officer, the agency which supports the PBO in their work is organized into two divisions: Economic and Fiscal Analysis, and Budgetary Analysis and Costing. Each division is led by an Assistant Parliamentary Budget Officer. Both divisions support the PBO's role to inform parliamentarians and improve budget transparency.

=== The Economic and Fiscal Analysis Division ===
The Economic and Fiscal Analysis Division provides economic and fiscal analysis, outlook and risk assessments. This analysis relies heavily on the use of econometric and statistical models and includes broader research on macroeconomic and fiscal policy.

=== The Budgetary Analysis and Costing Division ===
The Budgetary Analysis and Costing Division analyzes program costs and estimates, assesses budgetary systems and provides cost estimates on Parliamentary proposals. This work often involves financial analysis and ‘due-diligence’, assessing business cases and developing cost methodologies.

== Operating model ==
The PBO's basic operating model was developed through extensive stakeholder consultations.

- Independence: The PBO's advice is independent, objective and non-partisan.
- Open and Transparent Publishing Model: The PBO's analysis is openly reported to committees and parliamentarians and is freely accessible to all on its public website.
- Collaboration and Partnering: The PBO works with academics, think tanks, consulting firms and external experts to provide authoritative analysis. Peer review is also used when appropriate to ensure the quality and credibility of the analysis.
- Setting Priorities Based on Materiality and Contribution Potential: The PBO maintains an independent research plan, while simultaneously responding to incoming requests from parliamentarians and committees.

Given resource limitations, research priorities are set using two core principles:
- materiality: the issue can reasonably be expected to have a substantive impact on the government’s finances, estimates or the Canadian economy and;
- contribution potential: the issue has the potential to increase budget transparency and/or promote informed parliamentary and public dialogue towards implementing sound budget policy and financial management

=== Access to information ===
The PBO has developed an information protocol. This process relies on the legislated provisions of the Parliament of Canada Act to provide the PBO with free and timely access to information from departments and agencies, while simultaneously providing them with clarity, predictability and transparency for all PBO information requests.

The Parliament of Canada Act states that "the Parliamentary Budget Officer is entitled, by request made to the deputy head of a department... to free and timely access to any financial or economic data in the possession of the department that are required for the performance of his or her mandate."

=== Relation to the Auditor General ===
The PBO and the Auditor General of Canada provide distinct, but complementary services to support Parliament.

The PBO, on the other hand, provides independent economic, fiscal and financial analysis to Parliament and parliamentarians. The PBO also provides these types of reports to relevant committees upon request.

The Auditor General takes a retrospective view of the public accounts and plays an assurance role. This is distinct from the PBO's work, which is largely prospective in nature and in a decision support role for Parliament.

== Parliamentary Budget Officers ==
The Parliamentary Budget Officer is an officer of both houses of the Parliament of Canada, the Senate and the House of Commons, and reports to the speakers of both chambers.

The Governor in Council appoints the Parliamentary Budget Officer for a term of not more than seven years (formerly five years), renewable once. The Prime Minister nominates the PBO.

No.	Name	Begin date	End date	Notes
1	Kevin Page	March 25, 2008	March 22, 2013	
–	Sonia L'Heureux	March 25, 2013	September 2, 2013	Acting; Parliamentary Librarian
2	Jean-Denis Fréchette	September 3, 2013	September 2, 2018	
3	Yves Giroux	September 3, 2018	September 2, 2025	
–	Jason Jacques	September 3, 2025	March 3, 2026	Interim; six-month term
4	Annette Ryan	April 22, 2026	current	

== See also ==
- Congressional Budget Office (United States)
- Office for Budget Responsibility (United Kingdom)
- National Assembly Budget Office (Korea)
- Parliamentary Budget Office (Australia)
