= Korean National Assembly Budget Office =

National Assembly Budget Office (Korea)
Agency overview
- Formed: 2003
- Agency executive: Chunsoon Kim, Chief of the National Assembly Budget Office
- Website: korea.nabo.go.kr/

The National Assembly Budget Office (NABO) supports the Korean National Assembly by analyzing and evaluating issues related to the national budget, fund and fiscal operations.

== History ==
2003.

Establishment of the National Assembly Budget Office

2007.

Initiation of government performance management evaluation program

2010.

Acquisition of access to national tax statistics

2012.

Publication of "Long-term Fiscal Projection 2012–2060"

2015.

Initiation of Special Taxation Evaluation Program
Initiation of the exclusive mandate to produce cost estimates of bills

2017.

Inauguration of the Seventh (current) Chief, Dr. Chunsoon Kim
Revision of Organization Rule (4 Department, 2 Deputy Directors General, 3 Directors, 17 Divisions and total of 138 staff)

== Mission ==
The mission on the NABO is To support legislative activities through analysis and evaluation of national finances and policies.

== Leadership ==
The Speaker of the National Assembly appoints the Chief with the consent of the Steering Committee after examining recommendations from the NABO Chief Recommendation Commission. There is no specified term of service for the Chief, Chunsoon Kim is the current Chief of the National Assembly Budget Office.

== Divisions ==
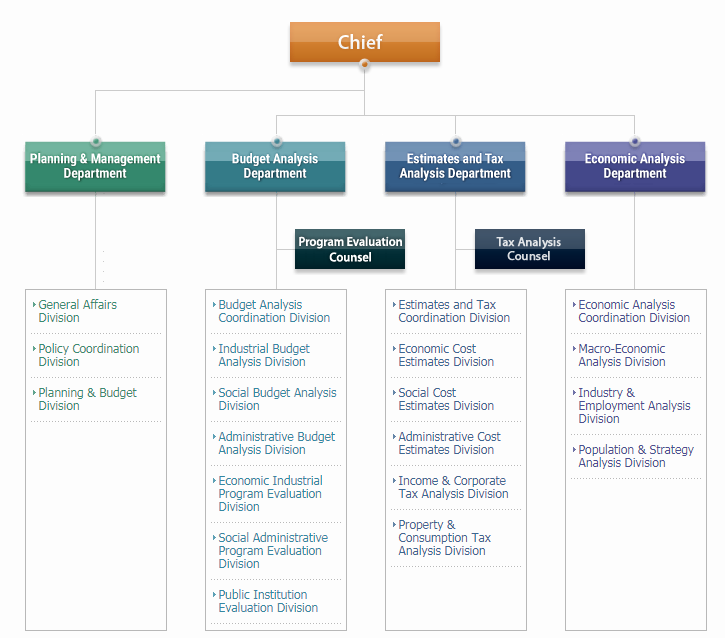
국회예산정책처 영문 조직도

The NABO is divided into the Planning and Management Department, the Budget Analysis Department, the Estimates and Tax Analysis Department, and the Economic Analysis Department.

Planning and Management Department

- General Affairs Division
- Policy Coordination Division
- Planning & Budget Division

Budget Analysis Department

- Program Evaluation Counsel
- Budget Analysis Coordination Division
- Industrial Budget Analysis Division
- Social Budget Analysis Division
- Administrative Budget Analysis Division
- Economic Industrial Program Evaluation Division
- Social Administrative Program Evaluation Division
- Public Institution Evaluation Division

Estimates and Tax Analysis Department

- Tax Analysis Counsel
- Estimates and Tax Coordination Division
- Economic Cost Estimates Division
- Social Cost Estimates Division
- Administrative Cost Estimates Division
- Income & Corporate Tax Analysis Division
- Property & Consumption Tax Analysis Division

Economic Analysis Department

- The Economic Analysis Coordination Division
- Macro-Economic Analysis Division
- Industry & Employment Analysis Division
- Population & Strategy Analysis Division

== See also ==
- Congressional Budget Office (United States)
- Office for Budget Responsibility (United Kingdom)
- Parliamentary Budget Officer (Canada)
- Parliamentary Budget Office (Australia)
