= Chancellorship of Jeremy Hunt =

Jeremy Hunt's tenure at HM Treasury (2022–2024)

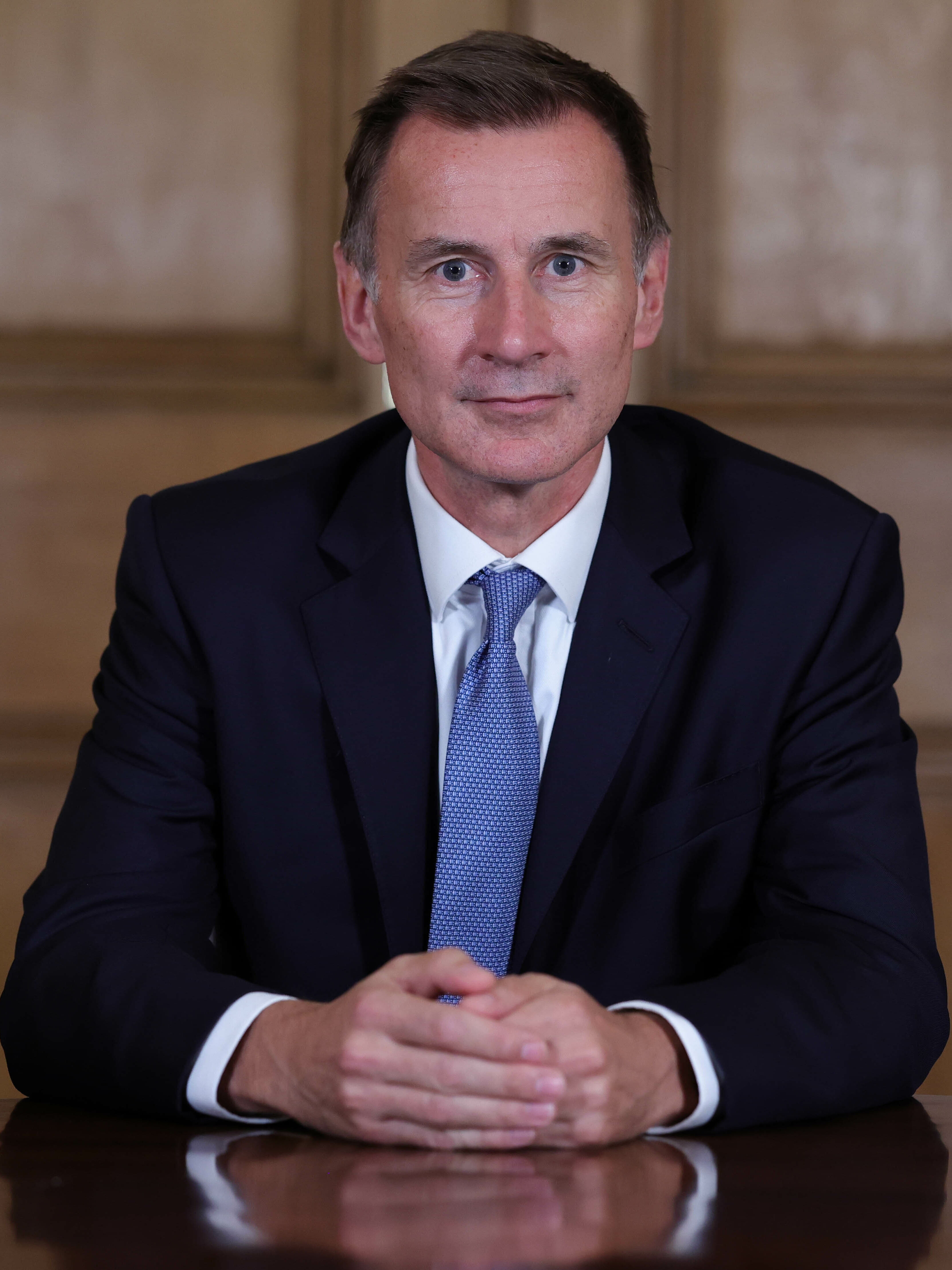
- Official portrait, 2022
- Chancellorship of Jeremy Hunt; 14 October 2022 – 5 July 2024
- Chancellor: Jeremy Hunt
- Party: Conservative
- Nominated by: Liz Truss; Rishi Sunak
- Appointed by: Charles III
- Seat: 11 Downing Street
- Coat of arms of HM Government

Jeremy Hunt served as Chancellor of the Exchequer of the United Kingdom from his appointment on 14 October 2022 to his resignation on 5 July 2024 after the Conservatives lost the 2024 General Election, during the premierships of Liz Truss and Rishi Sunak.

Hunt was appointed Chancellor of the Exchequer by Truss on 14 October 2022, following the dismissal of Kwasi Kwarteng, and retained the post in Rishi Sunak's ministry following Truss's resignation. During his time in the position, Hunt presented two budgets in 2023 and 2024 and two autumn statements in 2022 and 2023.

During his chancellorship, the left-wing New Statesman magazine named Hunt as the third most powerful right-wing figure of 2023, behind only Nigel Farage and Rishi Sunak. After the Conservatives lost the election in a landslide to the opposition Labour Party led by Keir Starmer, Hunt was succeeded as chancellor by Rachel Reeves.

== Appointment ==
Following the dismissal of Kwasi Kwarteng on 14 October 2022 due to the September 2022 mini-budget, Jeremy Hunt was appointed Chancellor of the Exchequer by Prime Minister Liz Truss. He swiftly appointed four economic advisors to a panel to advise him: Karen Ward (a former top advisor to Philip Hammond), Rupert Harrison, Gertjan Vlieghe, and Sushil Wadhwani.

On 18 October, Tory MP Sir Roger Gale stated "Jeremy Hunt is de facto prime minister at the moment". This was echoed by media, including The Guardian, with the Financial Times writing that many MPs believe he is now the country's de facto leader. The Economist called him "chancellor in name but prime minister in practice" and "the most powerful person in Britain". The New Statesman went on to name him as the third most powerful right-wing figure of 2023, behind only Nigel Farage and Rishi Sunak.

Following Truss's resignation, Hunt declined to stand in the party leadership election to replace her. Following Rishi Sunak's appointment as Prime Minister, it was confirmed that Hunt would continue as Chancellor.

== Chancellorship ==
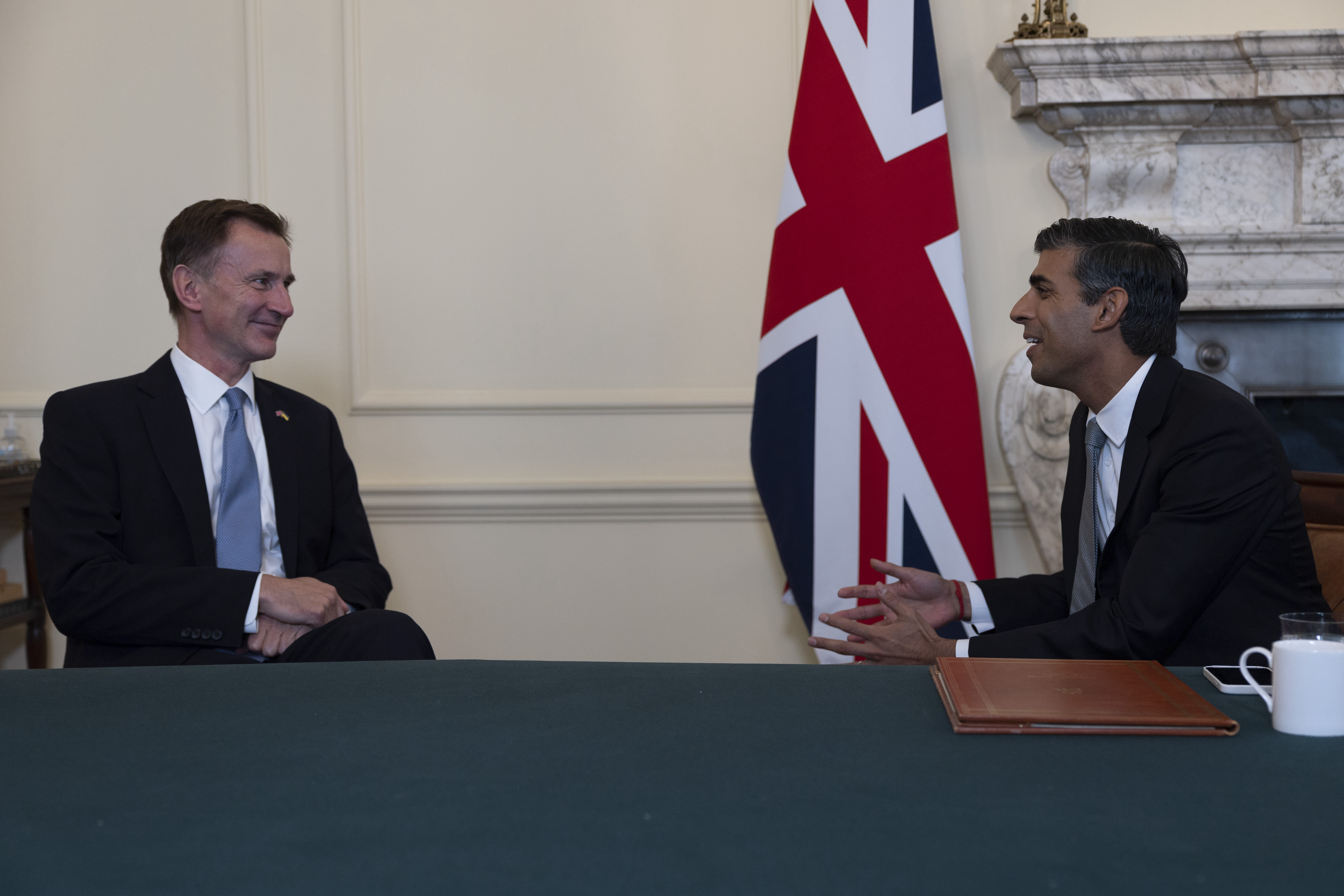
Hunt in a cabinet meeting with Rishi Sunak

Hunt's autumn statement took place on 17 November 2022 and retracted the majority of planned reforms from Kwarteng's mini-budget.

His 2023 spring budget, delivered on 15 March 2023, was the first full budget statement to be presented by Hunt since his appointment as chancellor. Announcements included a fuel duty freeze, an extension of the "Energy Price Guarantee" for three more months, investments in low-carbon energy projects and 30 hours of free child care for working people in England.

In July 2023, Hunt outlined reforms to the pension industry with the aim of boosting pension pots and increasing investment in British businesses. In a speech to business leaders, Hunt claimed the Mansion House reforms could generate £75 billion of investment into high growth businesses and increase the average Briton's pension pot by 12% over the course of their career.

In November 2023, Hunt gave the November 2023 United Kingdom autumn statement. He presented the March 2024 budget on 6 March 2024.

Following the subsequent formation of the Starmer ministry, Hunt was appointed Shadow Chancellor of the Exchequer in Rishi Sunak's caretaker Shadow Cabinet. On 31 October 2024, Hunt confirmed that he had told both of the two leadership candidates, Kemi Badenoch and Robert Jenrick, that he would stand down from the shadow cabinet after the new leader was elected, citing the "big drubbing in the election" and the need to "reflect on that and show new faces to the country" as his reasoning. He also confirmed that he would remain on the backbenches for the "next few years, at least."

== Budgets ==
Hunt delivered two budgets during his chancellorship, in March 2023 and March 2024. He also delivered two autumn statements, in November 2022 and November 2023.

=== 2022 autumn statement ===
The budget addressed the ongoing cost of living crisis, and saw the announcement of a five-year package of tax increases and spending cuts designed to steer the UK through recession. An economic forecast published on the same day by the Office for Budget Responsibility (OBR) stated the UK had entered a recession after experiencing two quarters of a shrinking economy, and predicted the UK's economy would shrink during 2023. A reduction in households' disposable income was also forecast.

In his statement, Hunt committed to maintaining scheduled public spending plans until 2025, but said that spending would slow after then. He also lowered the threshold at which earners become eligible to pay the top rate of income tax, and announced an increase in the National Minimum Wage, as well as increases for pensions and benefits in line with inflation. The Energy Price Guarantee was extended to April 2023, but raised from £2,500 to £3,000. Rachel Reeves described the measures as "an invoice for the economic carnage" caused by the government of Liz Truss.

=== 2023 budget ===
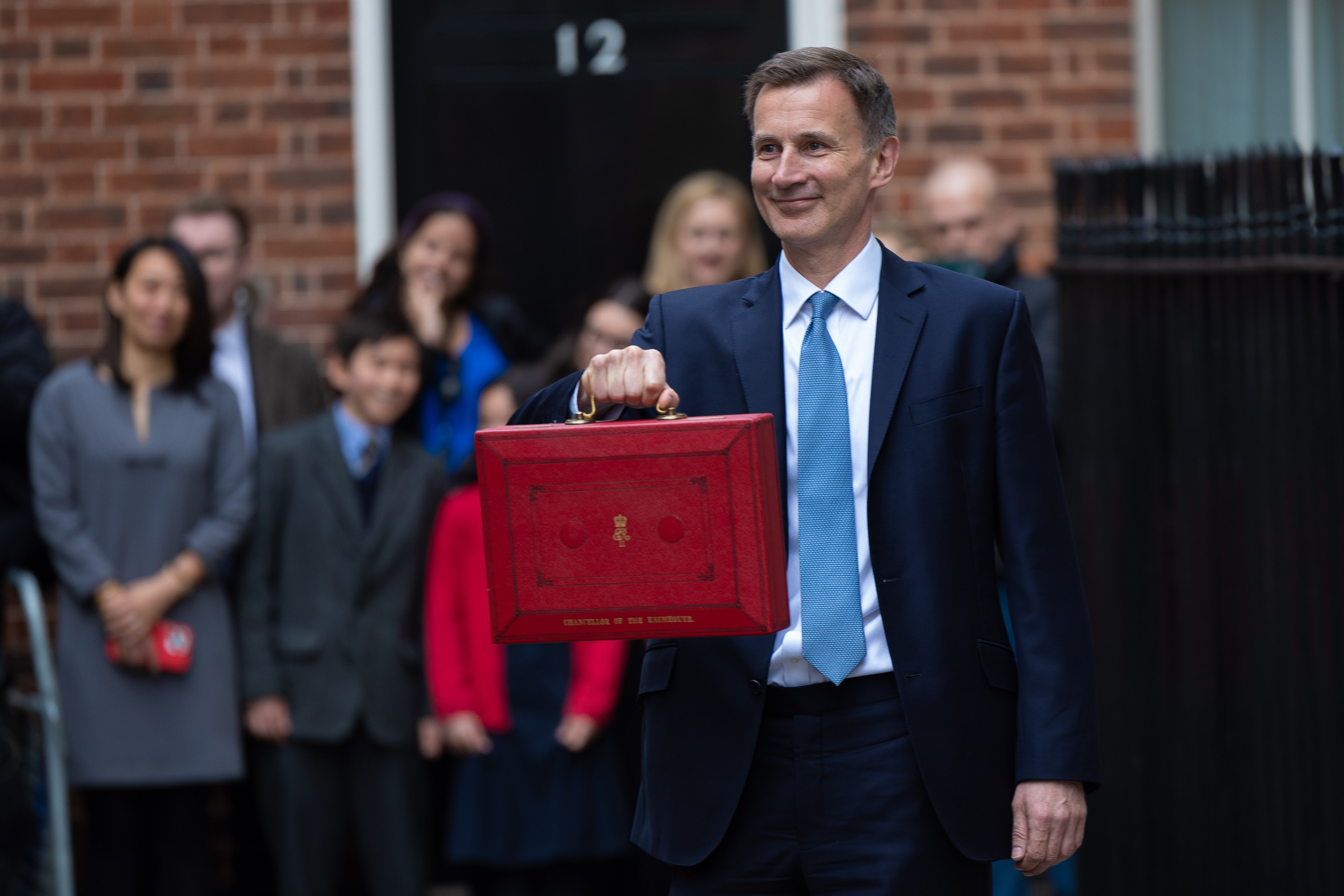
Hunt presenting his 2023 spring budget

The statement was presented as a budget for growth, with the objective of bringing about the conditions for long-term sustainable economic growth within the UK.

The UK had narrowly avoided going into recession at the end of 2022, and although there were some signs of recovery during the weeks preceding the budget, inflation remained high and the country continued to be impacted by an ongoing cost of living crisis. In his statement, Hunt set out plans to remove barriers to employment (with measures such as an increase in the amount of free childcare), encourage business investment (with measures including a programme of tax cuts for business worth £27bn), and address labour shortages in some industries (such as the construction sector). Government help for families facing financial pressure was also extended, with the Energy Price Guarantee extended for a further three months. The cap on the lifetime allowance for tax-free pensions contributions was also abolished in an attempt to encourage workers such as NHS doctors and consultants to remain in employment longer.

The budget was criticised by Keir Starmer, who accused the Conservatives of turning the UK back into the "Sick man of Europe", while Reeves said that Labour would reverse the pension tax changes. Stephen Flynn, the Leader of the Scottish National Party at Westminster, highlighted what he believed was the lack of support for families struggling financially. The pension tax changes were welcomed by the British Medical Association, who described it as "potentially transformative for the NHS". The BBC's Laura Kuenssberg questioned whether some of the measures, such as the plans to increase childcare, could be achieved, and suggested the government would be "punished" if they were not.

=== 2023 autumn statement ===
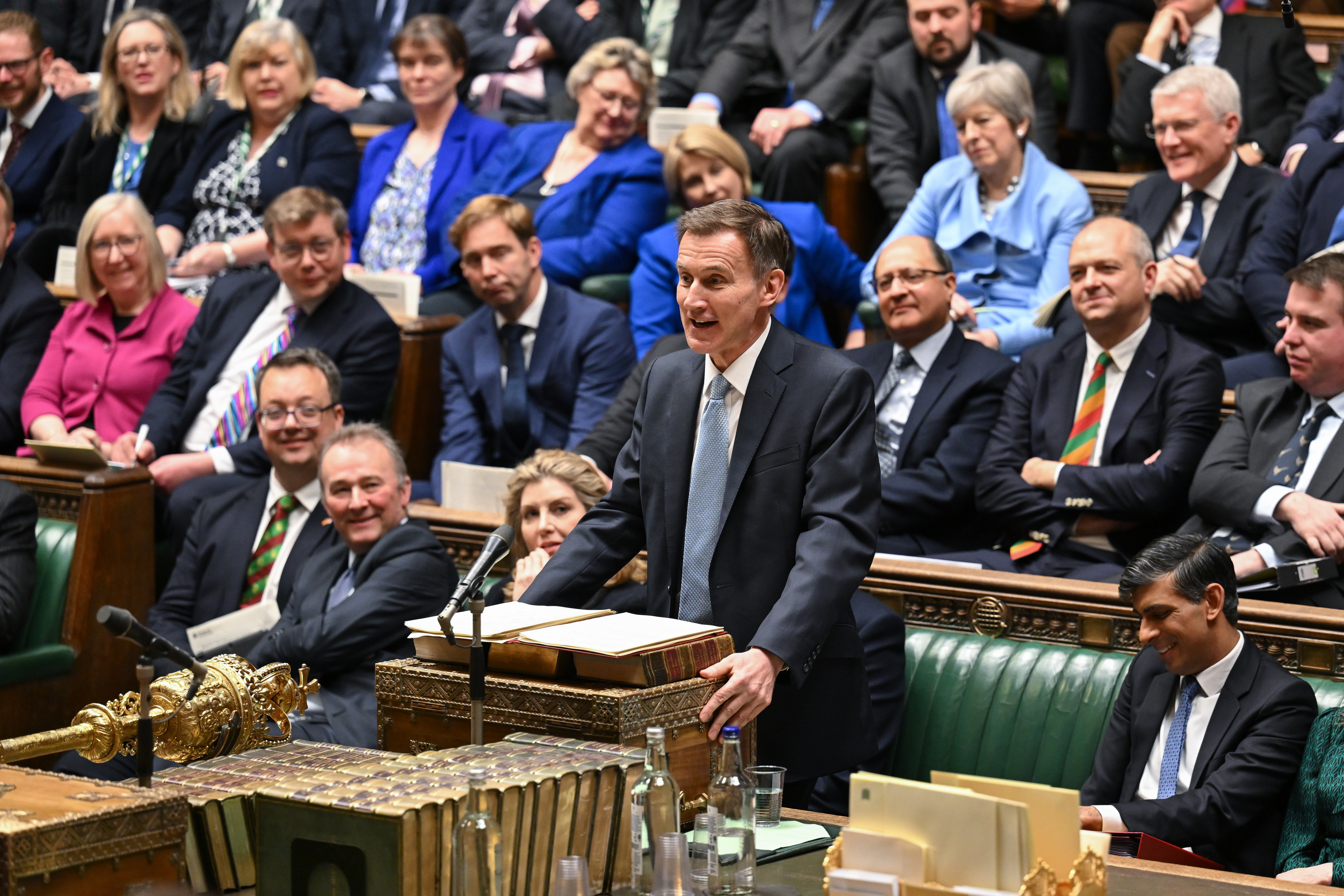
Hunt delivering his March 2024 budget speech

The statement, Hunt's second as Chancellor, came at a time when the Conservatives were trailing in the opinion polls, with the Labour Party experiencing a double-digit lead, and was his last autumn statement before the next general election.

Hunt was under pressure to cut taxes from those on the right of his party, but the Office for Budget Responsibility (OBR) had forecast that the UK economy would grow much more slowly over the coming two years than had previously been predicted. Inflation would not meet the 2% target forecast for 2024. However, Hunt told the House that because the economy had "turned a corner" there would be some scope for tax cuts, and he described his statement as setting out 110 measures for growth. Measures announced in the statement included reducing the amount of National Insurance contributions from 12% to 10%, making permanent a tax-break scheme for businesses purchasing equipment, a rise in the minimum wage, known as the National Living Wage, changes to benefits criteria, and investment in manufacturing and artificial intelligence.

The statement received a generally unfavourable reception from Westminster's main opposition parties, but was greeted more warmly by business. Reeves did not highlight any specific aspects of the statement, but instead criticised "the full scale of the damage to the economy" done by the Conservatives since 2010. while Rain Newton-Smith, Director of the Confederation of British Industry, said the Chancellor was "right to prioritise 'game-changing' interventions that will fire the economy".

=== March 2024 budget ===
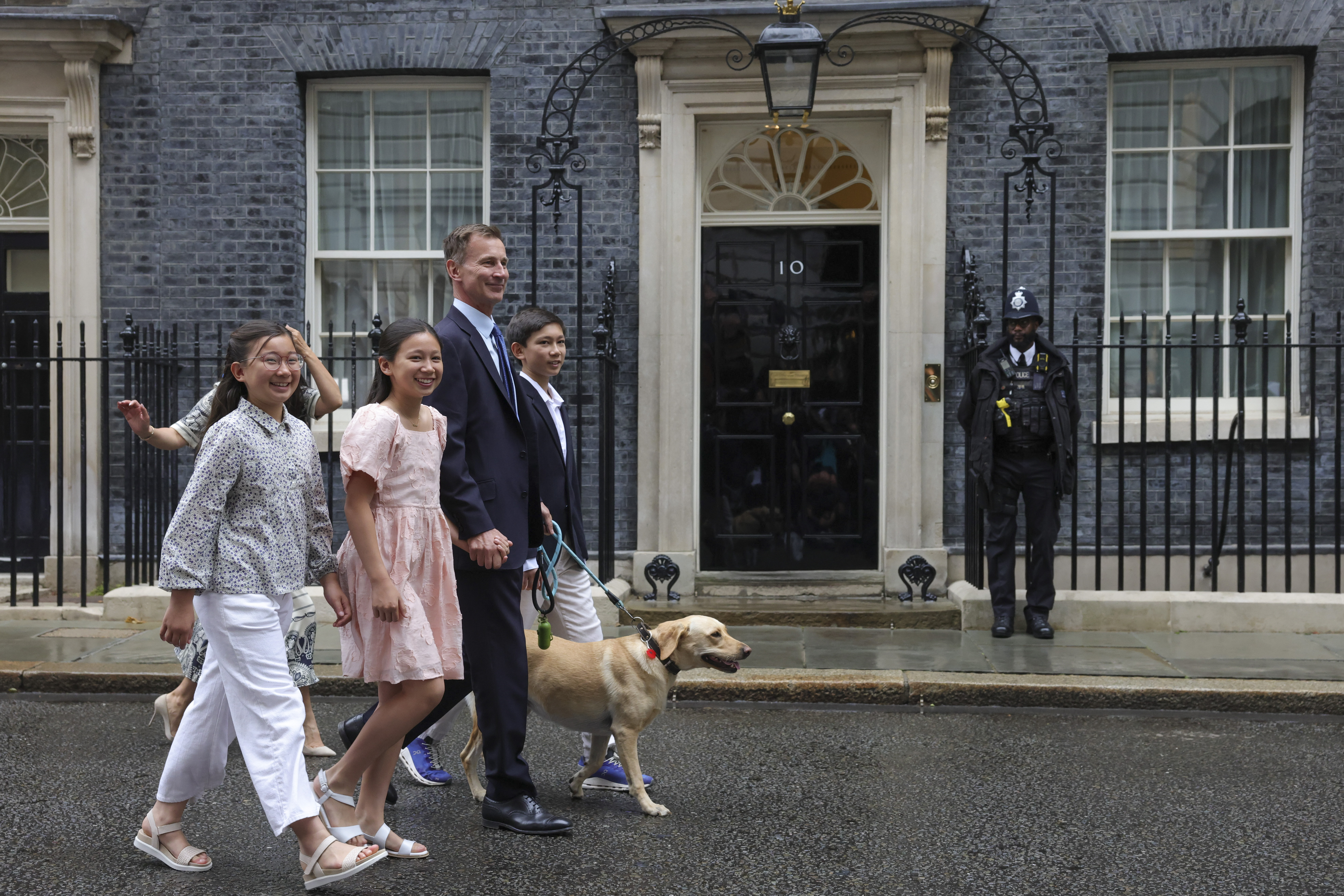
Hunt with his family leaving number 11 in the aftermath of 2024 general election

It was the third budget presented by Hunt since his appointment as Chancellor, the last to be delivered during his tenure as chancellor, and the last budget to be presented by the Conservative government of Rishi Sunak before the party was defeated by Labour in the 2024 general election.

In the budget, Hunt abolished the non-dom tax status, reduced employee's national insurance by 2%, froze alcohol and fuel duties, increased tobacco and vapes duties, extended the oil and gas windfall tax, increased the child benefit threshold, announced further energy measures, announced further levelling-up funding, reduced capital gains tax by 4%, extended the Household Support Fund and increased the VAT threshold to £90,000 for small businesses, and kept income tax personal allowances at the same level (fiscal drag)

The Budget announced the "biggest ever funding boost from government" for renewable energy. Further funding for science and technology investment were announced, with more investment to come from the private sector. The budget announced more measures to protect farmers with the agricultural property relief.

== See also ==
- Premiership of Liz Truss
- Premiership of Rishi Sunak
