= November 2023 United Kingdom autumn statement =

- Presented: 22 November 2023
- Parliament: 58th
- Party: Conservative Party
- Chancellor: Jeremy Hunt

The November 2023 United Kingdom autumn statement was outlined to the House of Commons on 22 November 2023 by Chancellor of the Exchequer Jeremy Hunt. The statement, Hunt's second as Chancellor, came at a time when the governing Conservative Party was trailing in the opinion polls, with the Labour Party experiencing a double-digit lead, and was his last autumn statement before the next general election.

Hunt was under pressure to cut taxes from those on the right of his party, but the Office for Budget Responsibility (OBR) had forecast that the UK economy would grow much more slowly over the coming two years than had previously been predicted. Inflation would not meet the 2% target forecast for 2024. However, Hunt told the House that because the economy had "turned a corner" there would be some scope for tax cuts, and he described his statement as setting out 110 measures for growth. Measures announced in the statement included reducing the amount of National Insurance contributions from 12% to 10%, making permanent a tax-break scheme for businesses purchasing equipment, a rise in the minimum wage, known as the National Living Wage, changes to benefits criteria, and investment in manufacturing and artificial intelligence.

The statement received a generally unfavourable reception from Westminster's main opposition parties, but was greeted more warmly by business. Rachel Reeves, the Shadow Chancellor of the Exchequer, did not highlight any specific aspects of the statement, but instead criticised "the full scale of the damage to the economy" done by the Conservatives since 2010. while Rain Newton-Smith, Director of the Confederation of British Industry, said the Chancellor was "right to prioritise 'game-changing' interventions that will fire the economy".

== Background ==
The 2023 budget in March 2023 was Hunt's first as chancellor. On 5 September, he announced the autumn statement would be presented on 22 November. The Office for Budget Responsibility was commissioned to prepare an economic and fiscal forecast that would be presented to Parliament on the day of the statement. The statement was preceded by the 2023 State Opening of Parliament, which took place on 7 November, and saw the government outline its legislative programme for the year ahead.

The UK government was facing a number of economic and political challenges. Inflation, which had peaked at 11.1% in October 2022, continued to be high, although figures for October 2023 showed the CPI measure of inflation to be at 4.6%. The Bank of England had increased the interest rate on 14 occasions since 2021 in an attempt to control inflation, and had not ruled out further increases, while warning the interest rate would remain high for some time. In January 2023, the government had set itself a target of halving inflation by the end of the year, and seemed on track to meet this, but inflation remained more than double the Bank's preferred level of 2%. Economic growth had stalled between July and September 2023, and the Bank had also forecast zero growth until at least 2025. Government borrowing had also been consistently higher than forecast, although figures for October 2023 had shown an unexpected fall in the figure. BBC News suggested this may have generated an extra £20bn, which the Chancellor could use to announce tax cuts.

Politically, the governing Conservative Party was trailing in opinion polls, with the opposition Labour Party showing a double-digit lead. With a general election expected to take place in 2024, and the United Kingdom facing the highest tax burden since the Second World War, the Chancellor was under pressure to use the autumn statement to announce tax cuts, particularly from those on the Conservative Party's libertarian wing, who were keen for significant tax cuts ahead of an election. Away from politics, a report produced by the Joseph Rowntree Foundation estimated that by the mid-2020s, an extra 3.9 million people would pay income tax for the first time due to the freeze on tax thresholds.

=== Pre-statement announcements ===
As the 2023 autumn statement approached, it was reported that Hunt was considering making relief on corporate taxes permanent. A number of policy statements and announcements were made in the days preceding the statement. On 16 November, both the Conservatives and Labour launched welfare to work policies ahead of the autumn statement; the Conservatives signalled their intention to focus on expanding career support for those on long-term health related benefits, while Labour outlined plans to reduce the 7.8 million NHS waiting list backlog. On 17 November, BBC News reported that Hunt was considering making cuts to inheritance tax and business tax. On 19 November, and during an appearance on Sunday with Laura Kuenssberg, Hunt said that the priority of the autumn statement would be to remove barriers to growth, but would not rule out cuts to income tax. On 20 November, Prime Minister Rishi Sunak said it would be possible to make sensible tax cuts after the government met its target of halving inflation by the end of 2023. On 21 November, Chancellor Jeremy Hunt announced an increase in the National Living Wage to £11.44 from April 2024; with the increase also encompassing those aged 21 and 22 for the first time.

== The statement ==
The 2023 autumn statement was Hunt's second as Chancellor. The accompanying report, published by the Office for Budget Responsibility (OBR), forecast that the UK economy would grow much more slowly over the coming two years than had previously been predicted, and that inflation would not meet the 2% target forecast for 2024. Inflation was now expected to grow by 0.6% in 2023 and 0.7% in 2024, before increasing by 1.4% in 2025, 1.9% in 2026, 2% in 2027 and 1.7% in 2028. Inflation was predicted to fall to 2.8% by the end of 2024, before reaching the Bank of England's preferred target of 2% in 2025, while living standards were not expected to return to the pre-pandemic levels until 2027–28. Moreover, the OBR indicated that higher inflation would mean that in real terms, the value of departmental budgets would be £19bn lower by 2027–28 compared with its March 2023 forecasts. The UK's underlying debt was forecast to be at 91.6% of GDP in 2023–24, 92.7% in 2024–25, and 93.2% in 2026–27, before falling to 92.8% in 2028–29. UK Government borrowing was forecast to fall from 4.5% of GDP in 2023–24 to 3% in 2024–25, followed by 2.7% in 2025–26, 2.3% in 2026–27, 1.6% in 2027–28 and 1.1% in 2028–29.

Addressing the House of Commons, Hunt said his autumn statement would contain 110 growth measures, with the government having "taken difficult decisions to put our economy back on track". He said the government had "supported families with rising bills, cut borrowing and halved inflation", but that "big government, high spending, and high tax" would lead to "less growth, not more". He told the House that because the economy had "turned a corner", there was room to make some tax cuts. Chief among these was a 2% cut in the main rate of National Insurance (NI) contributions from 12% to 10%, reducing NI payments for 27 million people by an average of £450 per year from 6 January 2024. A tax-break scheme for businesses purchasing equipment was also made permanent, something the Chancellor hailed as the "biggest business tax cut in modern history". Other announcements included a rise in the minimum wage, known as the National Living Wage, changes to benefits criteria, and investment in manufacturing and artificial intelligence. A comprehensive list of announcements is as follows:

=== Key points ===
- Full expensing, a tax break enabling businesses to deduct the full cost of investing in machinery and equipment from their tax bill, is made permanent, and will save businesses £250,000 in taxation for every £1m invested.
- 75% business rates discount for retail, hospitality and leisure companies in England extended for a further year.
- A premium planning service for England to fast track decision dates for major business applications.
- A £4.5bn scheme announced to attract investment to strategic manufacturing sectors, including green energy, aerospace, life sciences and zero-emission vehicles.
- £500m to be invested over two years to fund artificial intelligence innovation centres.
- Financial incentives for investment zones and tax reliefs for freeports extended from five to ten years.
- New investment zones announced for the West Midlands, East Midlands, Greater Manchester, Wrexham and Flintshire.
- £80m announced for new levelling up projects in Scotland.
- £14.1bn announced for the NHS and adult social care in England.
- An extra £2bn announced for schools for both 2023‑24 and 2024–25.
- Equivalent funding announced for devolved governments in Scotland, Wales and Northern Ireland.
- Defence spending to remain at 2% of national income.
- Spending on overseas aid to be kept at 0.5% of national income, below the official 0.7% target.
- Reduction in the main rate of National Insurance from 12% to 10% from 6 January 2024.
- Reduction in Class 4 National Insurance for self employed from 9% to 8% from April 2024.
- Increase in the National Living Wage from £10.42 to £11.44 per hour from April 2024. The age threshold for the increase will also be lowered from 23 to 21.
- Annual discount of up to £1,000 on energy bills for households living close to new pylons and transmission infrastructure for a decade.
- Working age benefits in England and Wales, such as Universal Credit, to increase by 6.7% from April 2024 in line with the September 2023 rate of inflation.
- State pensions to increase by 8.5% from April 2024, in line with average earnings.
- Local Housing Allowance to be unfrozen and increased to 30% of average rents from April 2024.
- Work Capability Assessment to be reformed to take into account the availability of home working following the COVID-19 pandemic.
- £1.3bn of funding over five years to help people with health conditions find employment.
- An additional £1.3bn of funding to help people who have been unemployed for over 12 months.
- Benefit claimants deemed in England and Wales deemed able to work who refuse to seek employment to lose access to their benefits and extras such as free prescriptions.
- Announcement of a consultation process on whether savers could be allowed to choose the pension scheme their employer pays into, potentially giving them one pension pot for life.
- Up to £7m over three years announced to tackle antisemitism in schools and universities.
- £5m announced for Imperial College London and Imperial College Healthcare NHS Trust to establish the Fleming Centre.
- £3m announced for Tackling Paramilitarism Programme in Northern Ireland.
- Duty on alcohol frozen until 1 August 2024.
- Duty on tobacco products increased by 2% above RPI inflation, with hand-rolling tobacco rising by 12% above RPI.
- No changes to fuel duty.
- VAT on period underwear to be abolished.

== Reaction ==
The reaction from the UK's other main political parties was generally negative. In her initial response to the statement, Shadow Chancellor Rachel Reeves chose not to highlight any individual announcements, but instead criticised what she described as "the full scale of the damage to the economy" done by the Conservatives since 2010, and described Labour as "the party of economic and fiscal responsibility". Drew Hendry, the Scottish National Party Treasury spokesman at Westminster, described the statement as "too little, too late for the squeezed majority of households", and branded it a "Tory con trick". Sarah Olney, the Liberal Democrat spokesperson for Treasury and Business, described the Autumn Statement as "a deception from the Chancellor after years of unfair tax hikes". The Institute for Public Policy Research suggested that cuts to National Insurance contributions would "largely benefit the best-off households".

There was a more positive response from institutions such as the Institute for Economic Affairs, as well as from business. Mark Littlewood, Director General of the Institute for Economic Affairs called the statement "a step in the right direction towards lower taxes and economic growth, but not a leap", while the Centre for Policy Studies described it as "a sensible and measured response to the fiscal challenges facing the country". Shevaun Haviland, Director General of the British Chamber of Commerce said the statement had "provided some welcome remedies" for business, and at a time when businesses "need certainty and security from the Government in the difficult months ahead", while Rain Newton-Smith, Chief Executive of the Confederation of British Industry, said the Chancellor was "right to prioritise 'game-changing' interventions that will fire the economy" such as making permanent the tax-break scheme for the purchase of equipment.

== Subsequent events ==
An opinion poll carried out by Techne UK on 22 and 23 November indicated support for the Conservatives continued to lag behind that of the Labour Party, with 21% for the Conservatives and 46% for Labour.

Appearing before the Treasury Select Committee on 28 November, Richard Hughes, chair of the Office for Budget Responsibility, told MPs the spending plans represented "a very big fiscal risk" because the figures were based on projected savings and consequently they contained a level of "uncertainty".

VAT on period underwear was abolished on 1 January 2024. On 6 January, the rate of National Insurance was reduced from 12% to 10%, reducing NI contributions for an estimated 27 million employees earning between £12,571 and £50,270. Speaking shortly after the change came into effect, Hunt told BBC Radio 4's Today programme the cut in National Insurance represented "nearly £1,000 for a typical two-earner family", but a BBC News investigation suggested that because National Insurance rates had been frozen since 2021, the saving would actually represent £913.20 a year.
