= David Miles =

British economist (born 1959)

David Miles CBE

Member of the Monetary Policy Committee
- In office 1 June 2009 – 31 August 2015
- Governor: Mervyn King (2003–2013); Mark Carney (2013–2015)

Personal details
- Profession: Economist

David Kenneth Miles CBE (born 1959) is a British economist. Born in Swansea, he has spent his working life in London, in teaching, business and the public sector. He is a professor at Imperial College London, and Member of the Budget Responsibility Committee at the Office for Budget Responsibility. He was Chief UK Economist of Morgan Stanley bank from October 2004 to May 2009. He had previously been an academic at Birkbeck College in the late 1980s and had worked for Merrill Lynch in the early 1990s. He was appointed to the Bank of England's interest-rate-setting Monetary Policy Committee (MPC) from May 2009 to June 2012 and again from June 2012 to 31 August 2015, before being replaced by Gertjan Vlieghe. According to the Bank of England, "As an economist he has focused on the interaction between financial markets and the wider economy.". In December 2020 he was appointed to the main board ("The Commission") of the central Bank of Ireland. He was appointed to the Budget Responsibility Committee of the Office for Budget Responsibility in December 2021. He took up that role in January 2022.

== Life ==
Miles was born in 1959, and was educated at the Bishop Gore School in Swansea, University College, Oxford, Nuffield College, Oxford, and the London School of Economics.

In 2003 Miles produced a report for the British Chancellor of the Exchequer to examine why the long-term fixed rate mortgage market is not as popular a product in Britain as in other countries. His report states: "A great many borrowers focus on the initial cost of debt and do not seem to consider carefully how those payments might change relative to their incomes".

Much of Miles's academic research has focused on housing, pensions, monetary policy, asset pricing and ways to make the financial system more stable. More recently he has written about the concept of economic injustice and raised issues about the degree to which reparations for past injustices are warranted. (His paper "The half life of economic injustice" quantifies the extent to which current people may have responsibility for past wrongs).

From 2004 to 2009 Miles was chief UK economist of Morgan Stanley bank. Miles predicted a substantial fall in real house prices in November 2006.

In 2009 he was asked, along with Gerald Holtham and Professor Berndt Spahn, to be on a commission established by the Welsh Assembly Government to investigate the scope for the Welsh Assembly to have greater fiscal autonomy. The Holtham Commission reported in July 2010.

From June 2009 to August 2015 Miles was on the Bank of England's Monetary Policy Committee. In 2011 he published a study Optimal bank capital on the appropriate balance sheet structure of banks to avoid a repeat of the 2008 financial crisis. He concluded that the Basel III agreements on capital requirements for banks set the standard for equity at only about half its appropriate level. In 2012 he began a second term with the Monetary Policy Committee.

He was president of the economics section of the British Science Association for 2015. He was appointed Commander of the Order of the British Empire (CBE) in the 2016 New Year Honours for services to monetary policy.

In 2016 he was appointed by Her Majesty's Treasury to advise on the measurement and reporting of yields on UK government debt. His report was completed in October 2016 and was subsequently implemented.

He has published in economic journals, written books on macroeconomics, on housing and on fiscal policy, authored government reports and newspaper articles. Since joining the Office for Budget Responsibility, much of his work has focussed on long run fiscal, many linked to demographic change and its implications.

== Bibliography ==
- Miles, David (1994). Housing, Financial Markets and the Wider Economy. Chichester England New York: Wiley. ISBN 978-0-471-95210-7.
- Miles, David; Myles, Gareth D.; Preston, Ian (2003). The Economics of Public Spending. Oxford New York: Oxford University Press. ISBN 978-0-19-926033-1.
- Miles, David; Scott, Andrew (2005). Macroeconomics: Understanding the Wealth of Nations (2nd ed.). Chichester, England: Wiley. ISBN 978-0-470-01243-7.
- Miles, David; Scott, Andrew; Breedon, Francis (2012). Macroeconomics: Understanding the Global Economy (3rd ed.). Chicester, West Sussex: John Wiley and Sons, Inc. ISBN 978-1-119-99571-5.
- Miles, David "The Half Life of Economic Injustice", Philosophy and Economics, volume 38, issue 1, 2022.
- Miles, David "Macroeconomic impacts of changes in life expectancy and fertility", The Journal of the Economics of Ageing, Volume 24,2023,.
- Miles, David "Pensions in an ageing society – Strains and pains of becoming older together", The Journal of the Economics of Ageing, Volume 34, 2026.
