= Jeremy Hunt =

British politician (born 1966)

The Right Honourable Sir Jeremy Hunt MP
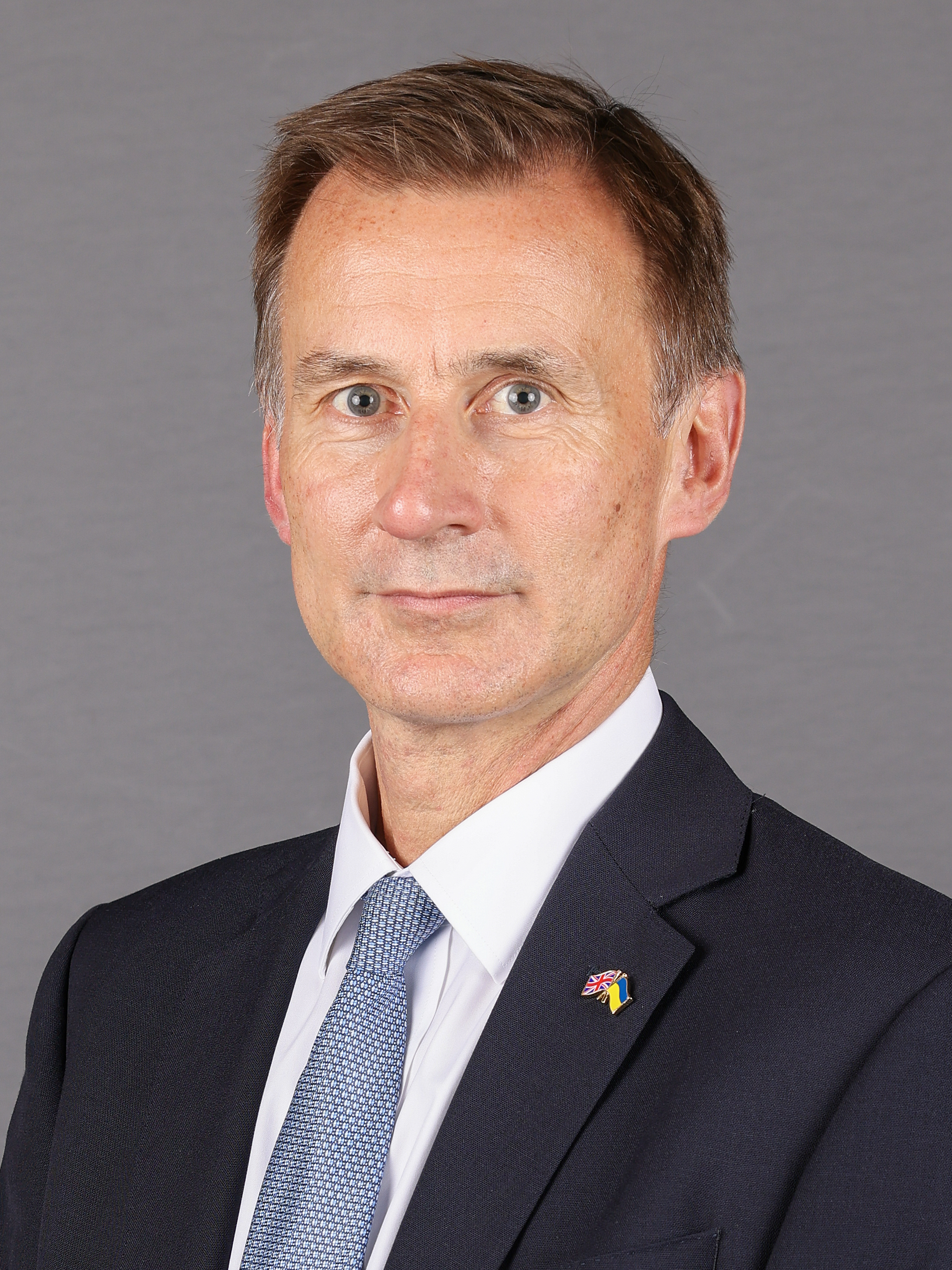
- Official portrait, 2022

Chancellor of the Exchequer
- In office 14 October 2022 – 5 July 2024
- Prime Minister: Liz Truss; Rishi Sunak
- Preceded by: Kwasi Kwarteng
- Succeeded by: Rachel Reeves

Foreign Secretary
- In office 9 July 2018 – 24 July 2019
- Prime Minister: Theresa May
- Preceded by: Boris Johnson
- Succeeded by: Dominic Raab

Secretary of State for Health and Social Care (Note: Secretary of State for Health until 8 January 2018)
- In office 4 September 2012 – 9 July 2018
- Prime Minister: David Cameron; Theresa May
- Preceded by: Andrew Lansley
- Succeeded by: Matt Hancock

Secretary of State for Culture, Olympics, Media and Sport
- In office 12 May 2010 – 4 September 2012
- Prime Minister: David Cameron
- Preceded by: Ben Bradshaw
- Succeeded by: Maria Miller
Shadow cabinet posts
Shadow Chancellor of the Exchequer
In office 8 July 2024 – 4 November 2024
Leader	Rishi Sunak
Preceded by	Rachel Reeves
Succeeded by	Mel Stride
Shadow Secretary of State for Culture, Media and Sport
In office 2 July 2007 – 11 May 2010
Leader	David Cameron
Preceded by	Hugo Swire
Succeeded by	Ben Bradshaw
Shadow Minister for the Olympics
In office 2 July 2007 – 11 May 2010
Leader	David Cameron
Preceded by	Hugo Swire
Succeeded by	Tessa Jowell
Shadow Minister for Disabled People
In office 6 December 2005 – 2 July 2007
Leader	David Cameron
Preceded by	Paul Goodman
Succeeded by	Mark Harper
Further offices held
Chair of the Health and Social Care Select Committee
In office 29 January 2020 – 14 October 2022
Preceded by	Sarah Wollaston
Succeeded by	Steve Brine

Member of Parliament for Godalming and Ash South West Surrey (2005–2024)
- Incumbent
- Assumed office 5 May 2005
- Preceded by: Virginia Bottomley
- Majority: 891 (1.6%)

Personal details
- Born: Jeremy Richard Streynsham Hunt; 1 November 1966 (age 60) Kennington, London, England
- Party: Conservative
- Spouse: Lucia Guo (m. 2009)
- Children: 3
- Parents: Nicholas Hunt (father); Meriel Hunt (mother)
- Relatives: Agnes Hunt (cousin); Rowland Hunt (cousin)
- Education: Magdalen College, Oxford (BA)
- Website: jeremyhunt.org
- Jeremy Hunt's voice Hunt announces changes to the September 2022 United Kingdom mini-budget Recorded 17 October 2022

Sir Jeremy Richard Streynsham Hunt (born 1 November 1966) is a British politician who served as Chancellor of the Exchequer from 2022 to 2024 and Foreign Secretary from 2018 to 2019, having previously served as Secretary of State for Health and Social Care from 2012 to 2018 and as Secretary of State for Culture, Olympics, Media and Sport from 2010 to 2012. A member of the Conservative Party, he has been the Member of Parliament for Godalming and Ash, formerly South West Surrey, since 2005. Hunt also served as Shadow Chancellor of the Exchequer in the Sunak shadow cabinet from July to November 2024.

The son of an Admiral of the Royal Navy, Hunt was born in Kennington and studied philosophy, politics and economics at Magdalen College, Oxford, where he was President of the Oxford University Conservative Association. He was first elected to the House of Commons in 2005 and was promoted to the Shadow Cabinet as Shadow Minister for Disabled People and later as Shadow Secretary of State for Culture, Media and Sport. Hunt served in the coalition government as Secretary of State for Culture, Olympics, Media and Sport, in which post he led the drive for local TV, resulting in Ofcom awarding local TV broadcasting licences in respect of several cities and towns. Hunt was Minister in the final stages of the long planned 2012 London Olympics, which received widespread acclaim.

Hunt served as Secretary of State for Health, later Health and Social Care, under the premierships both of David Cameron and of Theresa May, and became the longest-serving health secretary in British political history. During his tenure, Hunt oversaw the imposition of a controversial new junior doctors' contract in England after a dispute in which junior doctors undertook multiple strikes, the first such industrial action for 40 years. Following the resignation of Boris Johnson as foreign secretary over the Chequers Agreement, Hunt was appointed Secretary of State for Foreign and Commonwealth Affairs in July 2018. He was a candidate for the leadership election in 2019, finishing second to Johnson. He served as Chair of the Health and Social Care Select Committee from 2020 to 2022, a prominent role due to the COVID-19 pandemic. Following Johnson's resignation amid a government crisis in July 2022, Hunt launched a second leadership bid, but was eliminated in the first ballot of Conservative MPs.

Hunt was appointed Chancellor of the Exchequer by Liz Truss on 14 October 2022, following the dismissal of Kwasi Kwarteng, and retained the post in Rishi Sunak's ministry following Truss's resignation amid a government crisis. During his time in the position, Hunt presented two budgets in 2023 and 2024 and two autumn statements in 2022 and 2023. After the Conservatives lost the 2024 general election in a landslide to the opposition Labour Party led by Keir Starmer, Hunt was succeeded as chancellor by Rachel Reeves and served as Shadow Chancellor of the Exchequer in Sunak's caretaker Shadow Cabinet. The left-wing New Statesman magazine named him as the third most powerful right-wing figure of 2023, behind only Nigel Farage and Rishi Sunak.

== Early life and education ==
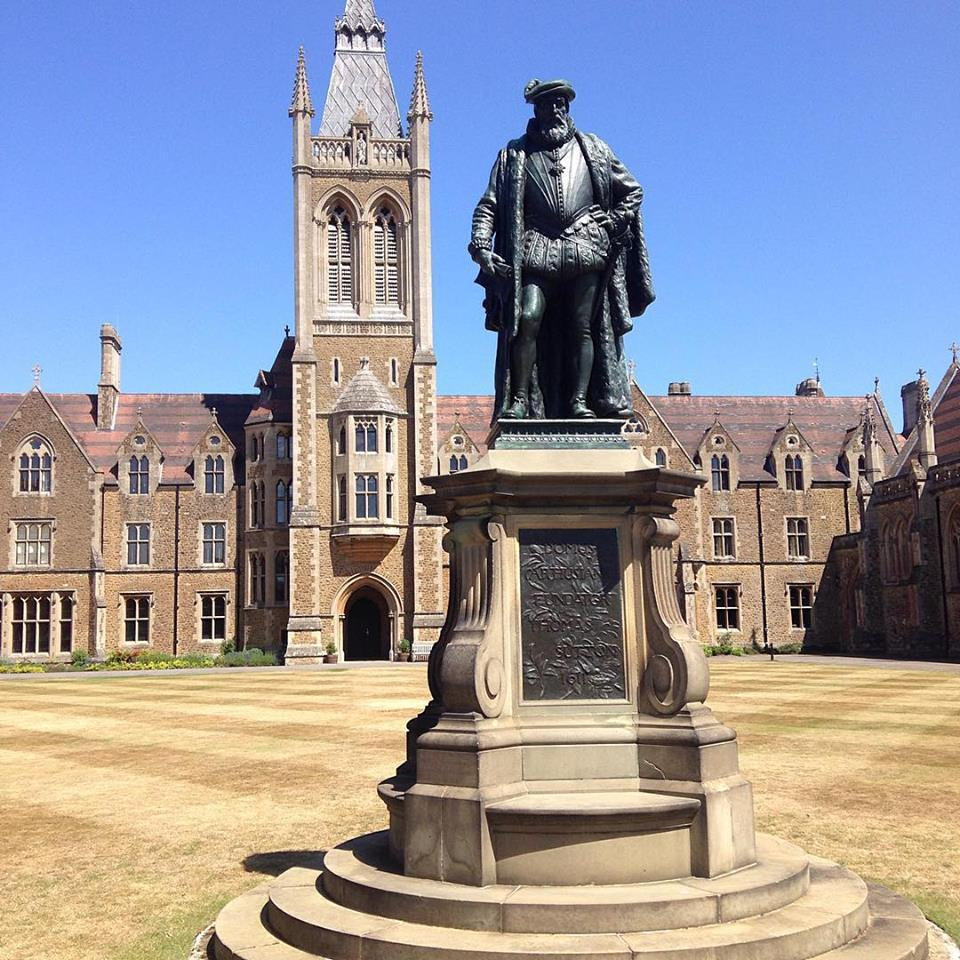
Hunt attended Charterhouse School, where he became head boy.

Jeremy Hunt was born on 1 November 1966 in Lambeth Hospital, Kennington, and raised in Shere, Surrey. He is the eldest son of Admiral Sir Nicholas Hunt, who was then a Commander in the Royal Navy assigned to work for the Director of Naval Plans inside the recently created Ministry of Defence, and his wife Meriel Eve Hunt, Lady Hunt (née Givan; 1937–2022), daughter of Major Henry Cooke Givan. The Hunt family were landed gentry, of Boreatton, Baschurch, Shropshire. A cousin was Agnes Hunt, pioneer of orthopaedic nursing.

Through a paternal great-grandmother, Hunt is a descendant of Sir Streynsham Master, a pioneer of the East India Company. He is also a distant relative of Queen Elizabeth II and of British Union of Fascists leader Sir Oswald Mosley. His father worked in NHS management after retiring from the navy, and his mother was a nurse in the 1950s and 1960s.

Hunt was privately educated at Charterhouse where he was Head of School. He then studied philosophy, politics and economics at Magdalen College, Oxford, graduating with a first class honours Bachelor of Arts (BA) degree. He became involved in Conservative politics while at university, where David Cameron and Boris Johnson were contemporaries. He was active in the Oxford University Conservative Association (OUCA) and was elected to serve as president in 1987.

== Early career ==
Following university, Hunt worked as a management consultant at OC&C Strategy Consultants for two years and then became an English language teacher in Japan. On his return to Britain, he tried his hand at a number of different entrepreneurial business ventures, with three failed start-ups including an attempt to export marmalade to Japan. In 1991, Hunt co-founded a public relations agency named Profile PR specialising in IT with Mike Elms, a childhood friend. Hunt and Elms later sold their interest in Profile PR to concentrate on directory publishing.

Hunt had been interested in creating a 'guide to help people who want to study rather than just travel abroad' and, together with Elms, founded a company known as Hotcourses in the 1990s, a major client of which is the British Council. Hunt stood down as director of the company in 2009; however, he still retained 48% of the shares in the company, which were held in a blind trust before Hotcourses was sold in January 2017 for over £35 million to Australian education organisation IDP Education. From 2009 onwards, Elms had guided and grown the company to this position after Hunt's segue into politics. Hunt personally gained over £14 million from the sale and in doing so became the richest member of Theresa May's Cabinet.

== Political career ==
=== Early parliamentary career (2005–2010) ===
At the 2005 general election, Hunt was elected to Parliament as MP for South West Surrey with 50.4% of the vote and a majority of 5,711.

After supporting David Cameron's bid for leadership of the Conservative Party, he was appointed Shadow Minister for Disabled People in December 2005. In the same year, he was a co-author of a policy pamphlet Direct Democracy: An Agenda For A New Model Party which included statements supporting denationalising the NHS and suggested replacing it with "a new system of health provision in which people would pay money into personal health accounts, which they could then use to shop around for care from public and private providers. Those who could not afford to save enough would be funded by the state". Hunt later denied that the policy pamphlet expresses his views. In David Cameron's reshuffle of 2 July 2007, Hunt joined the Shadow cabinet as Shadow Secretary of State for Culture, Media and Sport.

In 2009, Hunt was investigated by the Parliamentary Commissioner for Standards. The commissioner found: "Mr Hunt was in breach of the rules in not reducing his claims on the Additional Costs Allowance in that period to take full account of his agent's living costs. As a result, public funds provided a benefit to the constituency agent ... Mr Hunt received no real financial benefit from the arrangement and that the error was caused by his misinterpretation of the rules."

Hunt offered to repay half the money (£9,558.50), which was accepted. Hunt repaid £1,996 for claiming the expenses of his Farnham home while claiming the mortgage of his Hammersmith home. The commissioner said: "Mr Hunt has readily accepted that he was in error, and in breach of the rules of the House, in making a claim for utilities and other services on his Farnham home in the period during which it was still his main home. He has repaid the sum claimed, £1,996, in full. It is clear that, as a new Member in May 2005, his office arrangements were at best disorganised." The Legg Report showed no other issues.

=== Culture Secretary (2010–2012) ===
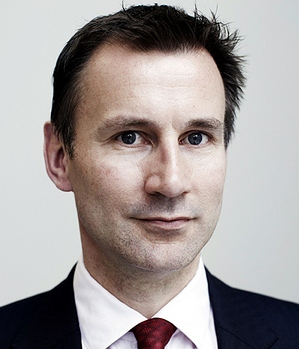
Hunt's portrait as Culture Secretary, c. 2010

At the 2010 general election, Hunt was re-elected to Parliament as MP for South West Surrey with an increased vote share of 58.7% and an increased majority of 16,318.

When the Conservatives and the Liberal Democrats formed a coalition following the general election, Hunt was appointed Secretary of State for Culture, Olympics, Media and Sport (combining the roles of leading the Department for Culture, Media and Sport with that of Minister for the Olympics). He was consequently appointed a Privy Councillor on 13 May 2010.

In June 2010, Hunt attracted controversy for suggesting football hooliganism played a part in the death of 96 football fans in the Hillsborough disaster; this was despite the fact that it had been established that a lack of police control and the presence of terraces and perimeter fences were the causes of the tragedy. Hunt later apologised.

In September 2010, The Observer reported that it "raised eyebrows" when Hunt's former parliamentary assistant, Naomi Gummer, was given a job within the Department for Culture, Media and Sport on a fixed-term civil service contract after Hunt had proposed departmental cuts of 35–50 per cent. The head of the Public and Commercial Services Union questioned Hunt's motives, saying: "Political independence of the civil service is a fundamental part of our democracy and we would be deeply concerned if this was being put at risk by nepotism and privilege." Gummer is the daughter of a Conservative life peer, Lord Chadlington, who was a director of Hotcourses between 2000 and 2004.

As Culture Secretary, Hunt devised and championed a plan to give Britain the fastest broadband speeds in Europe. There was initial scepticism about his plans with concerns they could lead to BT regaining its monopoly. He also spearheaded the drive for local TV and as a result of this policy Ofcom awarded local television licences to Belfast, Birmingham, Brighton and Hove, Bristol, Cardiff, Edinburgh, Glasgow, Grimsby, Leeds, Liverpool, London, Manchester, Newcastle, Norwich, Nottingham, Oxford, Plymouth, Preston, Sheffield, Southampton, and Swansea. In terms of culture policy, his main focus was to boost philanthropy given the spending cuts that the arts along with other sectors were experiencing. Changes were made to inheritance tax – including measures to encourage private gifts to the arts.

During Hunt's tenure, competition and policy issues relating to media and telecommunications became the responsibility of the Culture Secretary; they were removed from the purview of the Business Secretary, Vince Cable, after Cable was recorded stating that he had "declared war" on Rupert Murdoch.

In April 2012, The Daily Telegraph disclosed that Hunt had reduced his tax bill by over £100,000 by receiving dividends from Hotcourses in the form of property which was promptly leased back to the company. The dividend in specie was paid just before a 10% rise in dividend tax and Hunt was not required to pay stamp duty on the property.

==== News Corporation attempted takeover of BSkyB and Leveson Inquiry ====
Hunt was given the quasi-judicial power to adjudicate over the News Corporation takeover bid for BSkyB. Hunt chose not to refer the deal to the Competition Commission, announcing on 3 March 2011 that he intended to accept a series of undertakings given by News Corporation, paving the way for the deal to be approved. Following a series of scandals concerning phone hacking, a House of Commons motion was planned that called on News Corporation to abandon the bid. The bid was eventually dropped. Hunt was alleged to have had improper contact with News Corporation. Emails released to the Leveson Inquiry detailed contacts between Hunt's special advisor Adam Smith and Frédéric Michel, News Corporation's director of public affairs and therefore a lobbyist for James Murdoch. The revelations led to calls from the Labour opposition and others for Hunt's resignation. Smith, Hunt's special adviser, resigned on 25 April shortly before Hunt made an emergency parliamentary statement in which he said that Smith's contact with Michel was "clearly not appropriate". Hunt said Lord Justice Leveson should be able to investigate and rule on the accusations and requested the earliest date possible to give evidence to the Inquiry to set out his side of the story.

Hunt appeared before the Leveson Inquiry on 31 May 2012, when it emerged that Hunt had himself been in text and private email contact with James Murdoch. Journalist Iain Martin claimed that at a 2010 event held at UCL, which Murdoch attended, he saw Hunt hide behind a tree to avoid being seen by journalists. Hunt later told the Leveson Inquiry that "I thought, this is not the time to have an impromptu interview, so I moved to a different part of the quadrangle... there may or may not have been trees!"

Lord Justice Leveson cleared Hunt of bias when the report was published, stating that "in some respects, there was much to commend in Mr Hunt's handling of the bid". He concluded: "What was not evident from the close consideration of events which the Inquiry undertook was any credible evidence of actual bias on the part of Mr Hunt. Whatever he had said, both publicly and in private, about News Corporation or the Murdochs, as soon as he was given the responsibility for dealing with the bid the evidence demonstrates a real desire on his part to get it right. His actions as a decision maker were frequently adverse to News Corporation's interests. He showed a willingness to follow Ofcom's advice and to take action, to the extent recommended by the regulators, in response to the consultation."

==== London 2012 Olympics ====
As Culture Secretary, Hunt was the government minister responsible for the 2012 London Olympics and 2012 Summer Paralympics. When it transpired that contractors G4S could not provide enough security staff for the Games, Hunt announced that soldiers would be drafted in and that he had been forced to "think again" about the default use of private contractors. Hunt took the decision to double the budget for the opening ceremony which received acclaim, and overall the Games were considered a huge success internationally. According to Danny Boyle, the artistic director for the opening ceremony, the Government initially suggested removing the section of the opening ceremony about the NHS, although Hunt denied this.

The Games received widespread acclaim for their organisation, with the volunteers, the British military and public enthusiasm praised particularly highly. In the aftermath, Hunt set up the school games as an Olympic Legacy project. Although there was criticism at the time of cuts in the school sports budget, 11,953 schools took part in the School Games in the first year. Hunt also campaigned to increase the emphasis on the importance of the tourism industry, especially the potential of the Chinese tourist market.

=== Health Secretary (2012–2018) ===
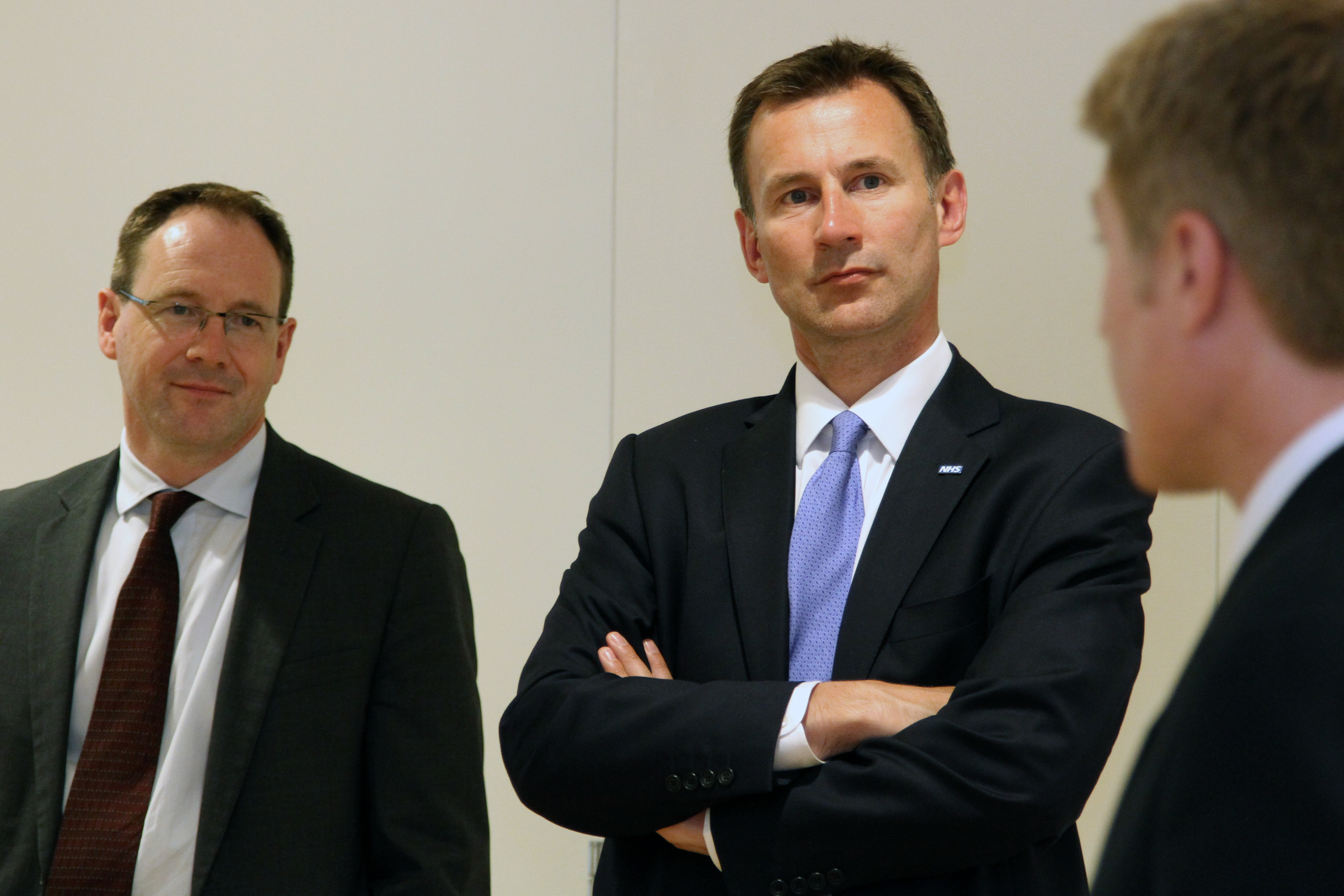
During a trip to the US, in 2013

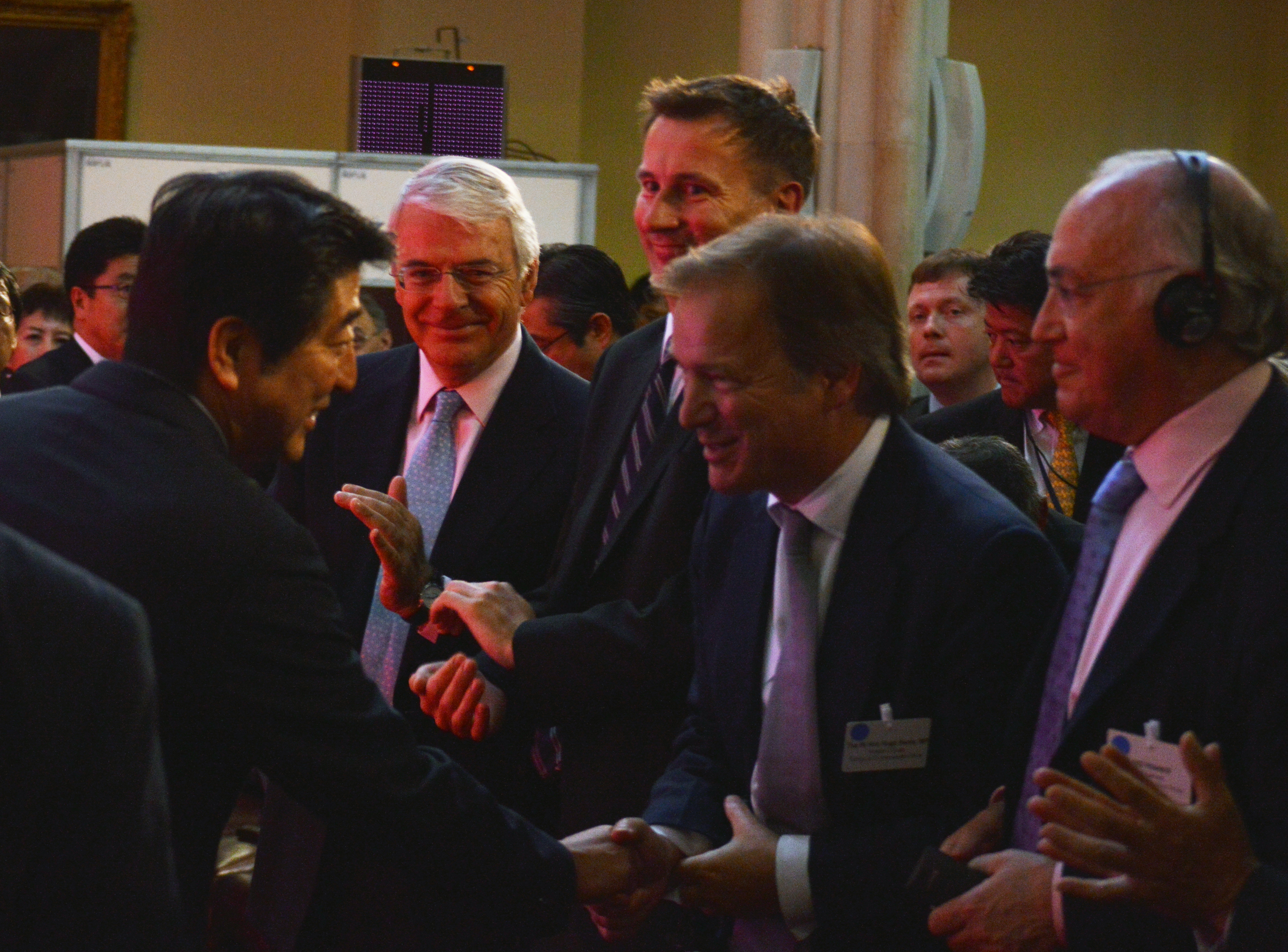
With then–Japanese Prime Minister Shinzo Abe, John Major, Hugo Swire and Michael Howard, in 2013

Hunt was appointed Secretary of State for Health in the 2012 cabinet reshuffle, succeeding Andrew Lansley. During his tenure Hunt pursued an ambitious agenda to address patient safety, regional variations in premature deaths, health tourism and A&E waiting times. He oversaw increased spending on the NHS but was criticised for controversial reforms, manipulating figures and increased privatisation. In a major break from a policy previously favoured by Conservative and Labour governments, Hunt declared patient choice was not key to improving NHS performance. He also defended the universal coverage provided by the NHS, including against US President Donald Trump. He has supported reducing the abortion limit from 24 weeks to 12 weeks and homoeopathy if recommended to patients by a doctor.

In 2012, Hunt attempted to downgrade casualty and maternity units in Lewisham. Hunt stated the cuts were necessary because neighbouring South London Healthcare NHS Trust had been losing more than £1m every week. A campaign led by GP Louise Irvine defeated Hunt in court in 2012 on this issue, with the judge ruling that Hunt acted outside his powers when he announced casualty and maternity units at Lewisham Hospital would be downgraded.

In March 2014, Hunt announced that the Government would not give a recommended 1% pay rise to NHS non-medical staff receiving progression pay (around 55% of total non-medical staff). Following a pre-election report in April 2015 that hospital chiefs shared an average 6% pay rise totalling £35 million, Hunt promised to investigate if the Conservatives won the election.

At the 2015 general election, Hunt was again re-elected with an increased vote share of 59.9% and an increased majority of 28,556.

In July 2015, Hunt became the subject of the first petition on a new UK Government website to reach the threshold of 100,000 signatures required for a petition to be considered for debate in Parliament. The petition called for a debate on a vote of "No Confidence" in Hunt as Health Secretary, and ultimately recorded 222,991 signatures leading to a debate on the motion being scheduled in September 2015. However, the Petitions Committee would not have had the power to initiate a vote of no confidence so instead debated the contracts and conditions of NHS staff.

In December 2015, an undercover Daily Telegraph investigation showed that in some cases locum agencies, Medicare and Team24 owned by Capita were charging some hospitals higher fees than others and giving false company details. The agencies were charging up to 49% of the fee. Hunt criticised those who sought "big profits" at the expense of the NHS and taxpayers and promised to "reduce the margins rip-off agencies are able to generate."

Hunt supported the UK remaining in the European Union (EU) in the 2016 referendum. After the result that supported Brexit was announced, Hunt suggested a second referendum on the terms of any exit deal, with him personally backing one in which the UK would stay in the single market.

Hunt became the longest-serving Health Secretary in British political history on 3 June 2018.

In October 2016, Hunt called for a reduction in the number of foreign doctors working in the NHS after the UK left the EU. At the Conservative Party Conference later in the month, Hunt pledged, by 2025, the NHS would be "self-sufficient in doctors". He announced an increase of up to 1,500 extra places at medical schools in the UK in 2018, partly funded by an increase in international medical student fees. Hunt also stated UK medical students would be forced to work in the NHS for at least four years or have to repay the cost of their training, around £220,000.

At the snap 2017 general election, Hunt was again re-elected, with a decreased vote share of 55.7% and a decreased majority of 21,590.

In October 2017, Hunt stated he supported Brexit, citing the "arrogance of the European Commission" in responding to the UK Government in the Brexit negotiations.

In April 2018, The Daily Telegraph reported that Hunt breached anti-money laundering legislation by failing to declare his 50 per cent interest in a property firm to Companies House within the required 28 days. Hunt also failed to disclose his interest in the property firm on the Parliamentary Register of Members' interests within the required 28 days. Hunt later rectified the error. A spokesman for Hunt said that Hunt's "accountant made an error in the Companies House filing, which was a genuine oversight". In response, a spokesman for Downing Street agreed with the Cabinet Office that there was no breach of the ministerial code. The Labour Party referred Hunt to the parliamentary commissioner for standards.

==== NHS weekend cover ====
In July 2015, Hunt indicated he would be prepared to impose a new consultant contract on doctors in England which would remove the opt out for non-emergency work at weekends to prevent "about 6,000 avoidable deaths" resulting from "Monday to Friday culture" in the NHS and to reintroduce "a sense of vocation" in consultants. The comments angered doctors who responded by sharing photographs of themselves working at weekends via social media using the hashtag #ImInWorkJeremy. Hunt was criticised by statisticians David Spiegelhalter and David Craven, BMA council chair Mark Porter and Shadow Health Secretary Heidi Alexander for his claims not merely misrepresenting the facts but potentially causing patients to delay hospitals visits and put themselves at risk. His critics described the Hunt Effect where patients who needed medical attention at a weekend had been deterred from doing so because they were persuaded it would be better to wait until a Monday.

In October 2015, Hunt was accused by the editor of The BMJ, Fiona Godlee, of repeatedly misrepresenting a study published in the journal on the weekend effect. He had used the study as evidence when stating reduced staffing levels of doctors at weekends directly led to 11,000 excess deaths. Godlee asserted the study's authors did not specify that the excess deaths were avoidable or that staffing levels were the cause. The lead author of the study, Nick Freemantle, stated they did not identify a cause for excess deaths or establish the extent to which they were avoidable. NHS Medical Director Bruce Keogh, a co-author of the study, said in response to Hunt's comments, "It is not possible to ascertain the extent to which these excess deaths may be preventable".

In January 2016, Hunt was criticised by stroke doctors for using out-of-date data to show stroke patients were more likely to die if admitted at weekends. They wrote there had been significant improvements since the period between 2004 and 2012, from which Hunt's data came, and new data showed there was "no longer any excess of hospital deaths in patients with stroke admitted at the weekend." Stroke specialist David Curtis said even the outdated statistics did not support Hunt's claims. In February, a leaked internal report by the Department of Health stated the department was unable to prove a link between increased consultant presence, availability of diagnostic tests, and reducing weekend mortality and length of stay. It highlighted the seven-day NHS could cost an additional £900 million each year, required the recruitment of 11,000 more staff including 4,000 doctors and 3,000 nurses, and community and social services could struggle to handle more discharges at the weekend.

In May 2016, another study also concluded there was no evidence people were more likely to die in hospitals at the weekend. In August, internal Department of Health risk management documents were leaked. They described 13 major risks in delivering the "truly seven-day NHS" pledge promised by the Conservatives prior to the 2015 general election. These included a lack of staff and funding for the policy. The documents also stated no advance impact assessments had been made to show how the policy would affect the delivery of NHS services. Chief executive of NHS Providers Chris Hopson described the seven-day NHS plan as "impossible to deliver" due to a lack of funding and staffing. He also highlighted pressures on the NHS, with 80% of acute hospitals in England in financial deficit compared to 5% in 2013 and an increase of missed A&E waiting time targets from 10% to 90% in the same time period. In May 2016, a report by the House of Commons public accounts committee criticised Hunt's plan for a seven-day NHS, saying "no coherent attempt" had made to understand staffing needs, the plan was "completely uncosted", and contained "serious flaws".

==== Junior doctors' contracts and strikes ====
Under Hunt, the Department of Health announced a new junior doctors' contract in England which would increase doctors' basic pay but extend "normal hours" for which they would not be paid a premium. In September 2015, the British Medical Association (BMA) said they would not re-enter negotiations unless Hunt dropped his threat to impose the contract and balloted their members for industrial action. They argued the contract would include an increase in working hours with a relative pay cut of up to 40%. Hunt tried reassuring the BMA by saying that no junior doctor would face a pay cut, before admitting those who worked longer than 56 hours a week would face a fall in pay but said working these long hours was unsafe. In November 2015, he said he would offer a basic pay increase of 11%, but still remove compensation for longer hours.

On 19 November 2015, the result of a BMA strike ballot was announced, with 98% voting for full strike action. An agreement was not reached by the junior doctors committee's deadline, so the BMA announced a strike would go ahead.

The first day of strike action was in January 2016 and involved junior doctors only providing emergency care. A second day of strike action occurred in February 2016 where doctors again provided only emergency care. Following these strikes, Hunt announced he would unilaterally impose the new contract without agreement or further negotiation, with NHS trusts instructed to introduce it in August. In response, the BMA announced three 48-hour long strikes and issued a legal challenge over the contract.

Further talks after the strikes resulted in an agreement to be put to a referendum. In the July referendum, 58% of BMA members rejected the offer. Following this, Hunt rejected holding any further talks with the BMA and announced the imposition of the new contract on junior doctors starting from October.

In February 2016, Hunt was polled as the "most disliked" frontline British politician. He acknowledged there would be "considerable dismay" and announced an urgent inquiry led by Academy of Medical Royal Colleges chair Susan Bailey into junior doctors' morale and welfare. The Academy Trainee Doctors' Group voted unanimously not to participate in the review under the offered terms. He said he had lessons to learn but denied any personal responsibility for the dispute.

Also in 2016, both Stephen Hawking and Robert Winston called for an inquiry into claims made by Hunt regarding whether the NHS had sufficient funding, with Hawking saying Hunt had "cherry-picked research, causing a devastating breakdown of trust between Government and the medical profession".

=== Foreign Secretary (2018–2019) ===
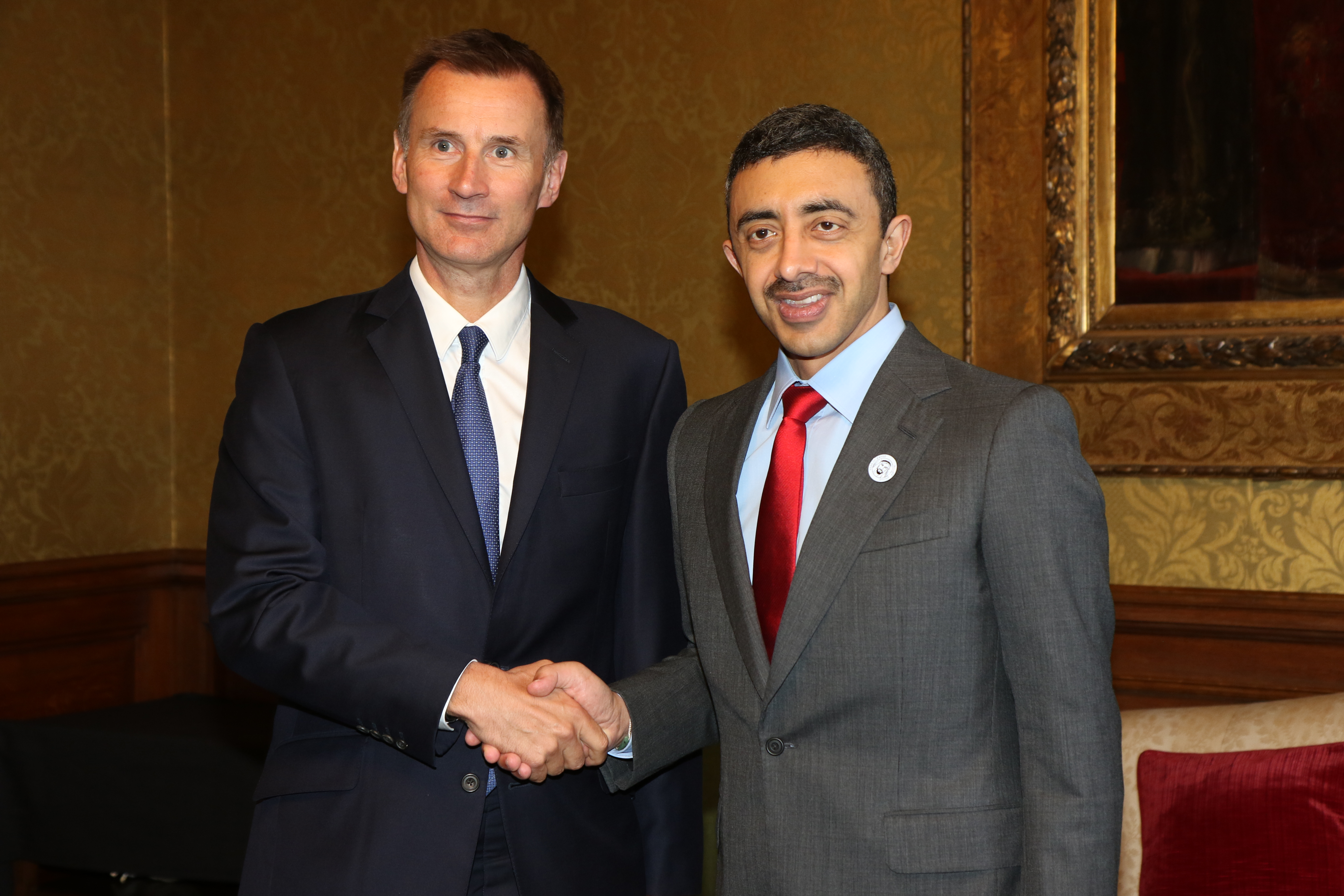
Hunt with United Arab Emirates Foreign Minister Abdullah bin Zayed Al Nahyan in September 2018

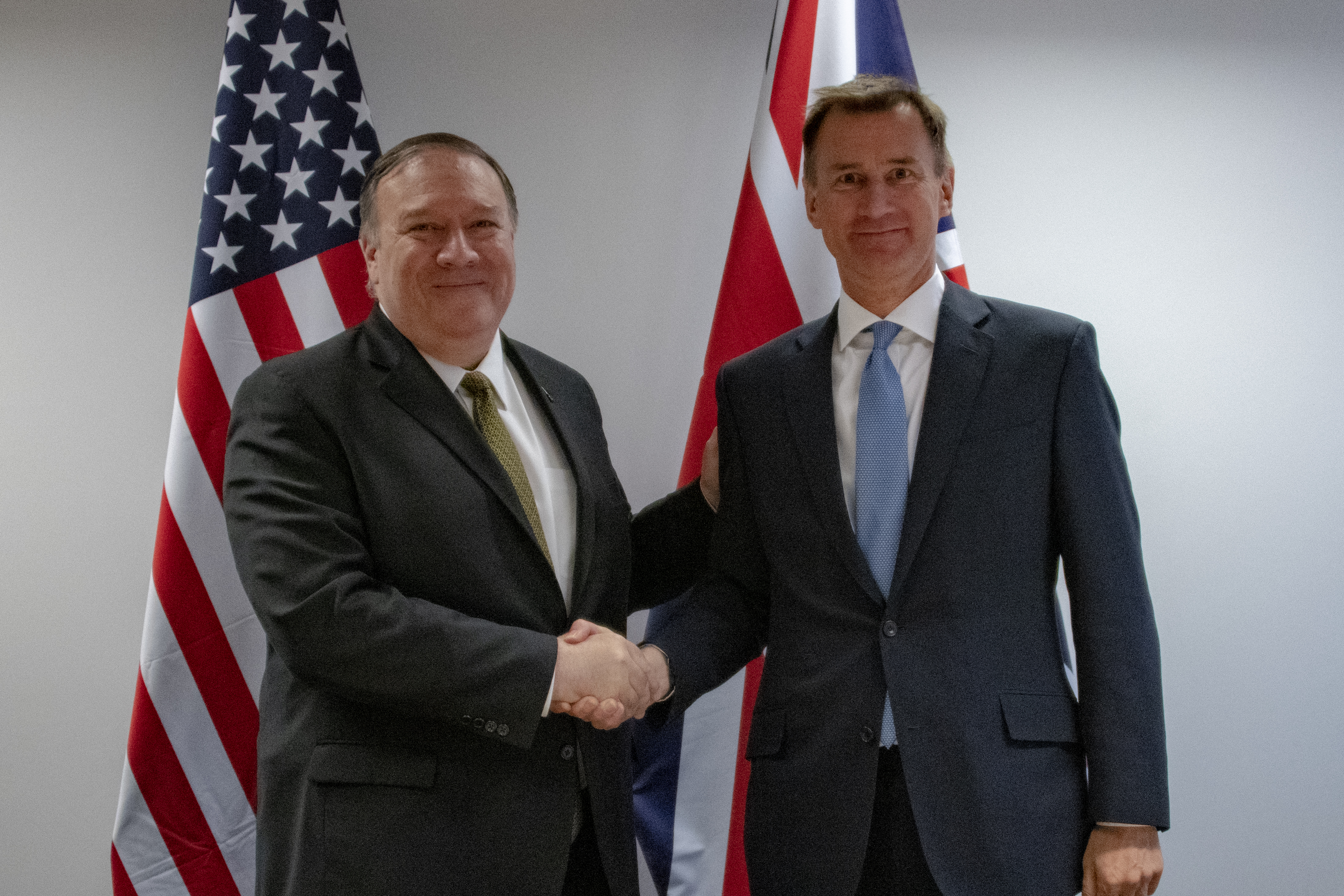
Hunt meeting with US Secretary of State Mike Pompeo in Brussels, May 2019

Hunt was appointed Foreign Secretary in July 2018 following the resignation of Boris Johnson. Hunt said "My principal job at a time of massive importance for our country is to stand four square behind the Prime Minister so that we can get through an agreement with the European Union based on what was agreed by the Cabinet last week at Chequers." After being appointed Foreign Secretary, Hunt expressed fears over the UK potentially leaving the EU without a deal. He said that it would be "incredibly challenging economically" and that "It would lead to a fissure in relations which would be highly damaging for that great partnership that we have had for so many years, which has been so important in sustaining the international order."

Hunt supported the Saudi Arabian-led military intervention in Yemen and described Saudi Arabia as a "very, very important military ally". In August 2018, he defended Britain's alliance with Saudi Arabia after a bomb dropped on a school bus in Yemen killed 51 people, including 40 children, although he said he was "deeply shocked" at the deaths. Amid global outrage over the murder of Saudi dissident journalist Jamal Khashoggi at the Saudi Arabian consulate in Istanbul, Hunt rejected calls to end the UK's arms sales to Saudi Arabia, saying: "There are jobs in the UK ... at stake so when it comes to the issue of arms sales we have our procedures." In February 2019, he urged Germany to lift ban on arms sales to Saudi Arabia and warned that Germans are risking "a loss of confidence in Germany's credibility as a partner", although he admitted: "Over 80,000 children [in Yemen] have died of starvation, there are about a quarter of a million people starving at the moment, and around 20 million people don't have food security – they don't know whether they're going to be able to get the food they need in the days ahead." Andrew Smith, of Campaign Against Arms Trade (CAAT), said Hunt "played an utterly central and complicit role in arming and supporting the Saudi-led destruction of Yemen".

In July 2018, Hunt visited China and met China's foreign minister Wang Yi. Hunt said that the "UK-China Strategic Dialogue is an important opportunity to intensify our cooperation on shared challenges in international affairs, ranging from global free trade to non-proliferation and environmental challenges, under the UK-China Global Partnership and 'Golden Era' for UK-China relations". In October 2018, he criticised the Xinjiang re-education camps and human rights abuses against the Uyghurs in China, saying: "British diplomats who visited Xinjiang have confirmed that reports of mass internment camps for Uighur Muslims were 'broadly true'."

As Foreign Secretary, Hunt was critical of Russia and Iran. On 23 August 2018, Hunt met United States Secretary of State Mike Pompeo to discuss the 'threat' from both countries. In April 2019, Hunt condemned the United States for recognising Israel's 1981 annexation of the Golan Heights, saying: "We should never recognise the annexation of territory by force. (...) We want Israel to be a success and we consider them to be a great friend but on this we do not agree." In June 2019, he stated he shared the US Government's assessment that Iran was to blame for two attacks on oil tankers in the Gulf of Oman.

Hunt supported the continued efforts of the UK Government to leave the European Union. During the September 2018 Conservative conference, Hunt likened the European Union to the former USSR, saying: "It was the Soviet Union that stopped people leaving. The lesson from history is clear: If you turn the EU club into a prison, the desire to get out won't diminish." This comment was strongly criticised. While on a February 2019 Brexit-related visit to Ljubljana, he caused anger by congratulating his hosts on "making really remarkable transformation from a Soviet vassal state to a modern European democracy." In fact Slovenia, as part of Yugoslavia, had previously been non-aligned.

In November 2018, Hunt threatened the United Arab Emirates with "serious diplomatic consequences" after it sentenced British research student Matthew Hedges to life in prison for allegedly spying for the UK. Hunt said that the verdict "is not what we expect from a friend and trusted partner of the United Kingdom and runs contrary to earlier assurances". Hedges was released at the end of November, after intense negotiations.

Following the April 2019 arrest of WikiLeaks founder Julian Assange in London's Ecuadorian Embassy, Hunt thanked the Ecuadorean President Lenín Moreno for his cooperation.

=== Conservative Party leadership candidate (2019) ===
2019 leadership campaign logo

Hunt announced his campaign to become the leader of the Conservative Party on 24 May 2019, following the resignation of Prime Minister Theresa May. On 20 June 2019, he was named one of the final two candidates. Hunt was defeated by Boris Johnson, having secured only one third of the vote. His campaign was given £10,000 by a close associate to Saudi Arabian Crown Prince Mohammed bin Salman.

Following Boris Johnson's election as party leader, Hunt was offered the role of Secretary of State for Defence in Johnson's Cabinet but decided to turn it down.

=== Backbencher (2019–2022) ===
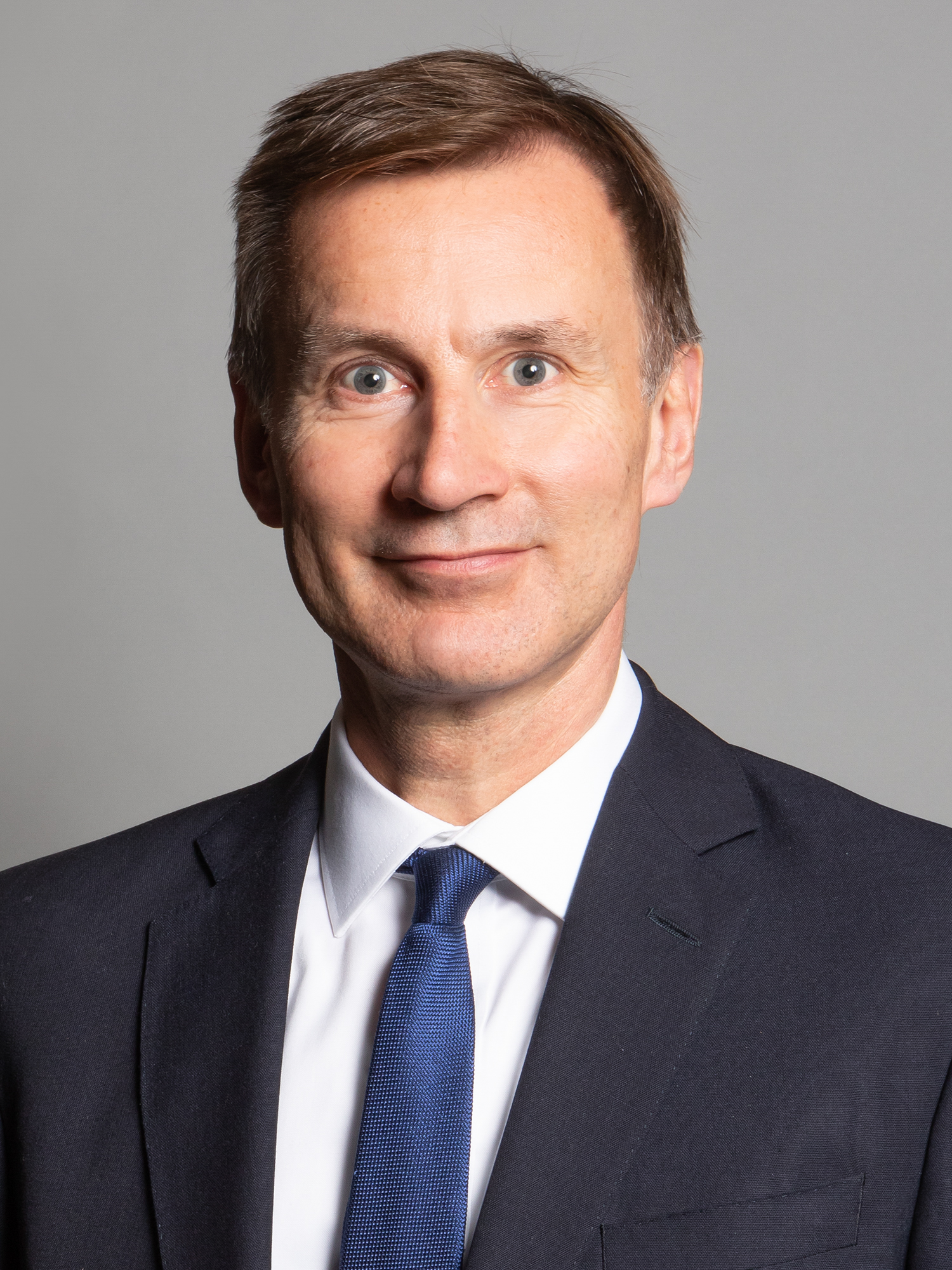
Official portrait, 2020

Returning to the backbenches, Hunt founded Patient Safety Watch in October 2019, with the charity seeking to establish data to report on patient safety and harm in care, continuing the work on safety he started as Health Secretary. He chairs the organisation and said he planned to invest considerable sums of money into it. However, according to The Guardian, two thirds of its income is spent on the salary of Hunt's former political advisor who was sacked over a previous lobbying scandal.

At the 2019 general election, Hunt was again re-elected with a decreased vote share of 53.3% and a decreased majority of 8,817.

He was elected as the new chair of the Health and Social Care Select Committee in January 2020, succeeding Sarah Wollaston. In February 2020, Hunt called for an inquiry into the National Health Service after the publishing of many reports regarding infant mortality in NHS hospitals.

In March 2020, Hunt expressed disapproval of the Government's response to the emerging COVID-19 pandemic, criticising the Government for still allowing "external visits to care homes" and "not preventing mass gatherings".

Hunt voted against Boris Johnson in the 2022 vote of confidence and urged other colleagues to do the same.

His book, Zero: Eliminating unnecessary deaths in a post-pandemic NHS, argues for "candour, a no-blame culture and a sincere determination to treat every mistake as an opportunity to learn how to do better next time". He writes that in the NHS there are 150 preventable deaths each week, and draws on the experience of the airline industry to advocate a shift from a blame culture to a learning culture.

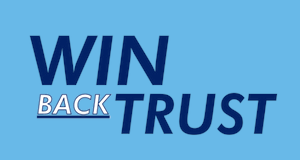
2022 leadership campaign logo

=== Conservative Party leadership candidate (2022) ===
Following the resignation of Boris Johnson, Hunt announced he would be standing in the subsequent Conservative Party leadership election. He criticised Johnson for investing in infrastructure instead of "wealth creation", and proposed policies including a moratorium on business rates in deprived areas and a cut to corporation tax to 15% instead of a proposed rise to 25%. He also said he would retain the rise in National Insurance rates and would not cut personal taxation until he "[got] the economy growing". Hunt said Esther McVey would be deputy prime minister if he were to become prime minister. He was eliminated in the first round of voting on 13 July, receiving 18 votes. He endorsed Rishi Sunak after being eliminated.

=== Chancellor of the Exchequer (2022–2024) ===
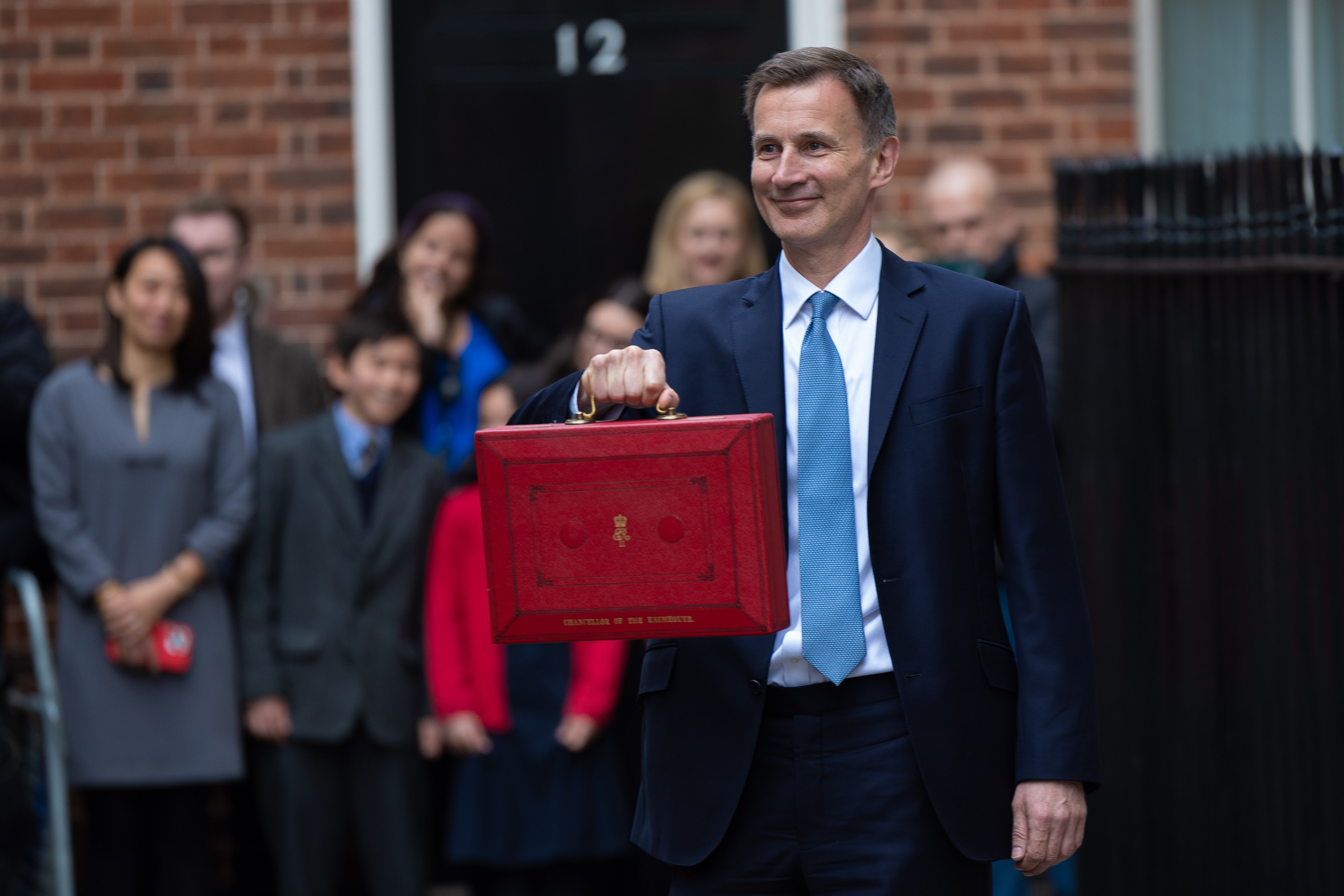
Hunt presenting his 2023 spring budget

Following the dismissal of Kwasi Kwarteng on 14 October 2022 due to the September 2022 mini-budget, Hunt was appointed Chancellor of the Exchequer by Prime Minister Liz Truss. He swiftly appointed four economic advisors to a panel to advise him: Karen Ward (a former top advisor to Philip Hammond), Rupert Harrison, Gertjan Vlieghe, and Sushil Wadhwani.

On 18 October, Conservative MP Roger Gale stated "Jeremy Hunt is de facto prime minister at the moment". This was echoed by media, including The Guardian, with the Financial Times writing that many MPs believe he is now the country's de facto leader. The Economist called him "chancellor in name but prime minister in practice" and "the most powerful person in Britain". The New Statesman went on to name him as the third most powerful right-wing figure of 2023, behind only Nigel Farage and Rishi Sunak.

Following Truss's resignation, Hunt declined to stand in the party leadership election to replace her. Following Rishi Sunak's appointment as Prime Minister, it was confirmed that Hunt would continue as Chancellor.

His autumn statement took place on 17 November 2022 and retracted the majority of planned reforms from Kwarteng's mini-budget.

His 2023 spring budget, delivered on 15 March 2023, was the first full budget statement to be presented by Hunt since his appointment as chancellor. Announcements included a fuel duty freeze, an extension of the "Energy Price Guarantee" for three more months, investments in low-carbon energy projects and 30 hours of free childcare for working people in England.

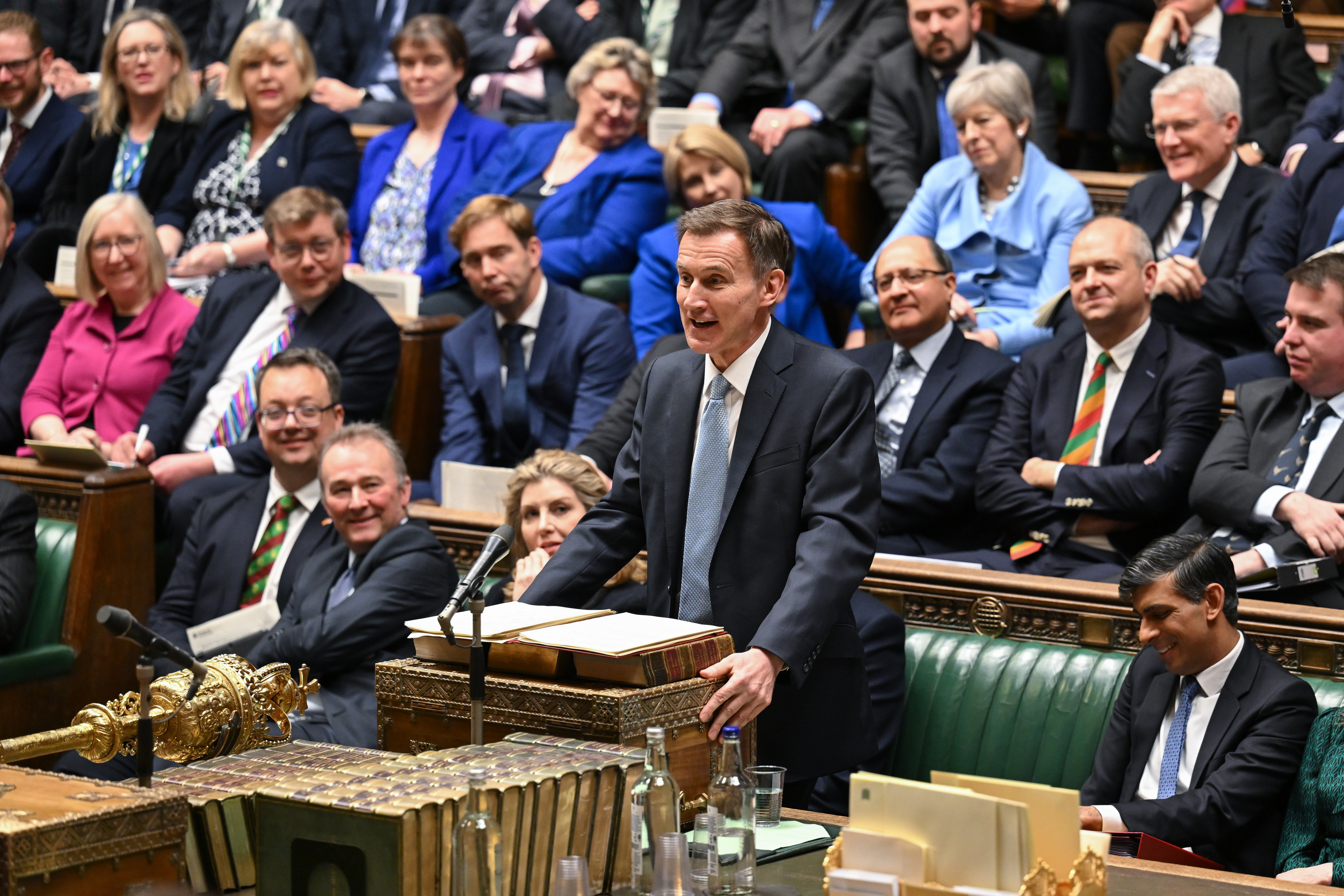
Hunt delivering his 2024 budget speech

In July 2023, Hunt outlined reforms to the pension industry with the aim of boosting pension pots and increasing investment in British businesses. In a speech to business leaders, Hunt claimed the Mansion House reforms could generate £75 billion of investment into high growth businesses and increase the average Briton's pension pot by 12% over the course of their career.

In November 2023, Hunt gave the November 2023 autumn statement. He presented the 2024 budget on 6 March 2024.

=== In opposition (2024–present) ===
Due to the 2023 review of Westminster constituencies, Hunt's constituency of South West Surrey was abolished, and replaced with Godalming and Ash. At the 2024 general election, Hunt was elected to Parliament as MP for Godalming and Ash with 42.6% of the vote and a majority of 891.

Following the subsequent formation of the Starmer ministry, Hunt was appointed Shadow Chancellor of the Exchequer in Rishi Sunak's caretaker Shadow Cabinet. Hunt said that he would not stand in the 2024 Conservative Party leadership election. On 31 October 2024, Hunt confirmed that he had told both of the two leadership candidates, Kemi Badenoch and Robert Jenrick, that he would stand down from the shadow cabinet after the new leader was elected, citing the "big drubbing in the election" and the need to "reflect on that and show new faces to the country" as his reasoning. He also confirmed that he would remain on the backbenches for the "next few years, at least."

== Personal life ==
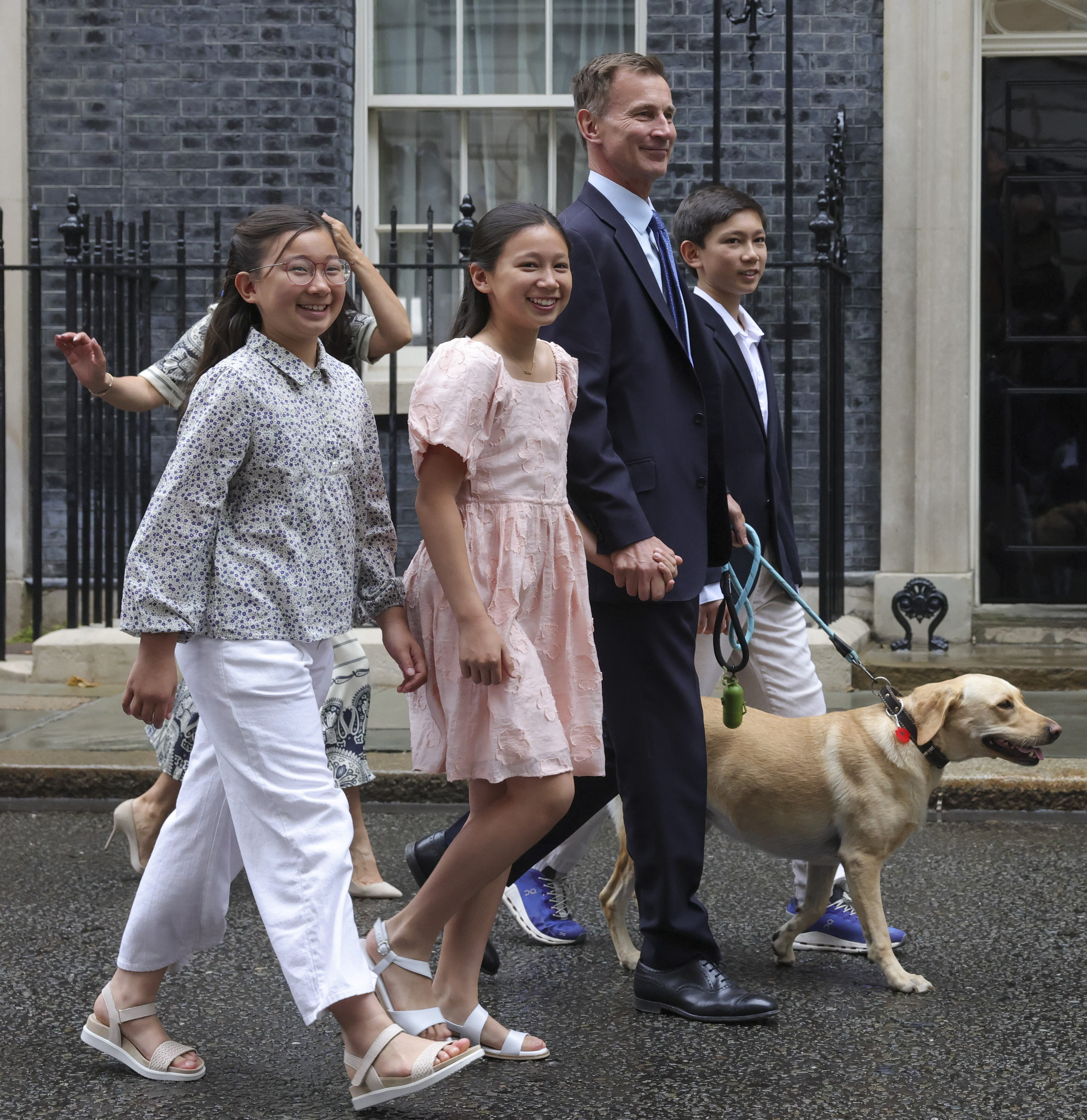
Hunt with his children and dog leaving Downing Street after the Conservative defeat in the general election, 5 July 2024

Hunt married Lucia Guo, Lady Hunt, who was born in Xi'an in central China, in July 2009. The couple have a son and two daughters. Hunt first met Guo in 2008, when she was working at Warwick University recruiting Chinese students for the university. Lady Hunt has presented a cultural segment called "Signature Flowers of China" on Sky's China Hour, a show coproduced by state-owned broadcaster China International Television Corporation. Hunt owns a townhouse in Pimlico, central London, as well as a home in Hambledon, Surrey.

Hunt and Lady Hunt own Mare Pond Properties Ltd, a company that bought seven luxury flats in Alexandra Wharf, Southampton, with the help of a standard bulk discount from property developer and Conservative donor Nicholas James Roach.

Hunt speaks Japanese, having studied the language for two years while working in Japan as an English-language teacher in the 1990s. He has named his personal political heroes as Margaret Thatcher and William Wilberforce. Hunt is a member of the Church of England.

Hunt has advocated pro-active good mental health through actions including exercise, social contacts, gratitude and sleep. In July 2023, he revealed that "every member of his family" has had cancer, and he himself had recovered from "a minor one". Hunt's younger brother, Charlie, died aged 53 on 2 August 2023, after being diagnosed with sarcoma in 2020.

On 11 April 2025, Hunt was knighted in Rishi Sunak's Resignation Honours List. He was formally invested by King Charles III on 9 December 2025.

== Honours ==
- 2010: Appointed to the Privy Council of the United Kingdom, giving him the honorific style "The Right Honourable" for life.
- 2020: Knight Grand Officer of the Equestrian Order of St Agatha of San Marino
- 2025: Knight Bachelor

== Publications ==
- Zero: Eliminating Unnecessary Deaths in a Post-Pandemic NHS (London: Swift Press, 2022) ISBN 978-1800751224
- Can We Be Great Again?: Why a Dangerous World Needs Britain (London: Swift Press, 2025) ISBN 978-1800751187
- Can We Be Rich Again?: The Surprising Potential of Britain's Economy (London: Swift Press, 2026) ISBN 978-1800756878

== Notes ==
Parliament of the United Kingdom
Preceded by Virginia Bottomley	Member of Parliament for South West Surrey; 2005–2024	Constituency abolished
New constituency	Member of Parliament for Godalming and Ash; 2024–present	Incumbent
Political offices
Preceded by Paul Goodman	Shadow Minister for Disabled People; 2005–2007	Succeeded by Mark Harper
Preceded by Hugo Swire	Shadow Secretary of State for Culture, Media and Sport; 2007–2010	Succeeded by Ben Bradshaw
Preceded by Hugo Swire	Shadow Minister for the Olympics; 2007–2010	Succeeded by Tessa Jowell
Preceded by Tessa Jowell	Minister of State for the Olympics; 2010–2012	Succeeded by Maria Miller as Secretary of State for Culture, Media and Sport
Preceded by Ben Bradshaw	Secretary of State for Culture, Media and Sport; 2010–2012	Succeeded by Maria Miller as Secretary of State for Culture, Media and Sport
Preceded by Andrew Lansley	Secretary of State for Health; 2012–2018	Succeeded by Himself as Secretary of State for Health and Social Care
Preceded by Himself as Secretary of State for Health	Secretary of State for Health and Social Care; 2018	Succeeded by Matt Hancock
Preceded by Boris Johnson	Foreign Secretary; 2018–2019	Succeeded by Dominic Raab
Preceded by Kwasi Kwarteng	Chancellor of the Exchequer; 2022–2024	Succeeded by Rachel Reeves
Preceded by Rachel Reeves	Shadow Chancellor of the Exchequer; 2024	Succeeded by Mel Stride
