= Gertjan Vlieghe =

British-Belgian economist (born 1971)

Member of the Monetary Policy Committee
- In office September 2015 – August 2021
- Governor: Andrew Bailey (2020–present)

Personal details
- Born: May 1971 (age 54) Belgium
- Profession: Economist

Gertjan Willem Vlieghe (born May 1971) is a British-Belgian economist.

== Early life ==
Gertjan Willem Vlieghe was born in Belgium in May 1971, and received a PhD from the London School of Economics.

== Career ==
Vlieghe was an economic assistant to Mervyn King at the Bank of England. He then worked as a bond strategist and director at the Deutsche Bank. Later, he worked as a senior economist at Brevan Howard, a hedge fund based in London.

In July 2015, it was announced that he would replace David Miles in September 2015 as an "external member", bringing in expertise from outside the Bank, in the nine-member Monetary Policy Committee (MPC) of the Bank of England.

Vlieghe was hired as an economic advisor to the Chancellor Jeremy Hunt in 2022.
