= Sushil Wadhwani =

British economist

- Born: 7 December 1959 (age 66); Mombasa, Kenya
- Citizenship: British
- Occupation: Economist

Academic background
- Education: (BSc) (MSc) (PhD) London School of Economics
- Doctoral advisor: Stephen Nickell

Academic work
- Discipline: Economics
- Institutions: UK Economic Advisory Council; Bank of England; Goldman Sachs

Sushil Baldev Wadhwani CBE (born 7 December 1959) is a British economist who was a member of the Bank of England's Monetary Policy Committee from June 1999 to May 2002. He had previously worked at Goldman Sachs and is also founder of his own firm PGIM Wadhwani.

== Early life and education ==
Wadhwani was born on 7 December 1966 in Mombasa, Kenya. He was educated at Mayo College, Ajmer, in India and at Stanmore Sixth Form College in the UK. He then studied economics at the London School of Economics (LSE), where he received BSc, MSc and PhD degrees. While studying for his doctorate he was appointed to a lectureship at the LSE, and remained there for a further eight years until leaving to join Goldman Sachs International as its Director of Equity Strategy.

== Career ==
Wadhwani is also the founder and chief investment officer of PGIM Wadhwani (formerly Wadhwani Asset Management). He was hired as an economic advisor to the Chancellor of the Exchequer, Jeremy Hunt, in 2022.
