= October 2022 United Kingdom government crisis =

October 2022 government crisis
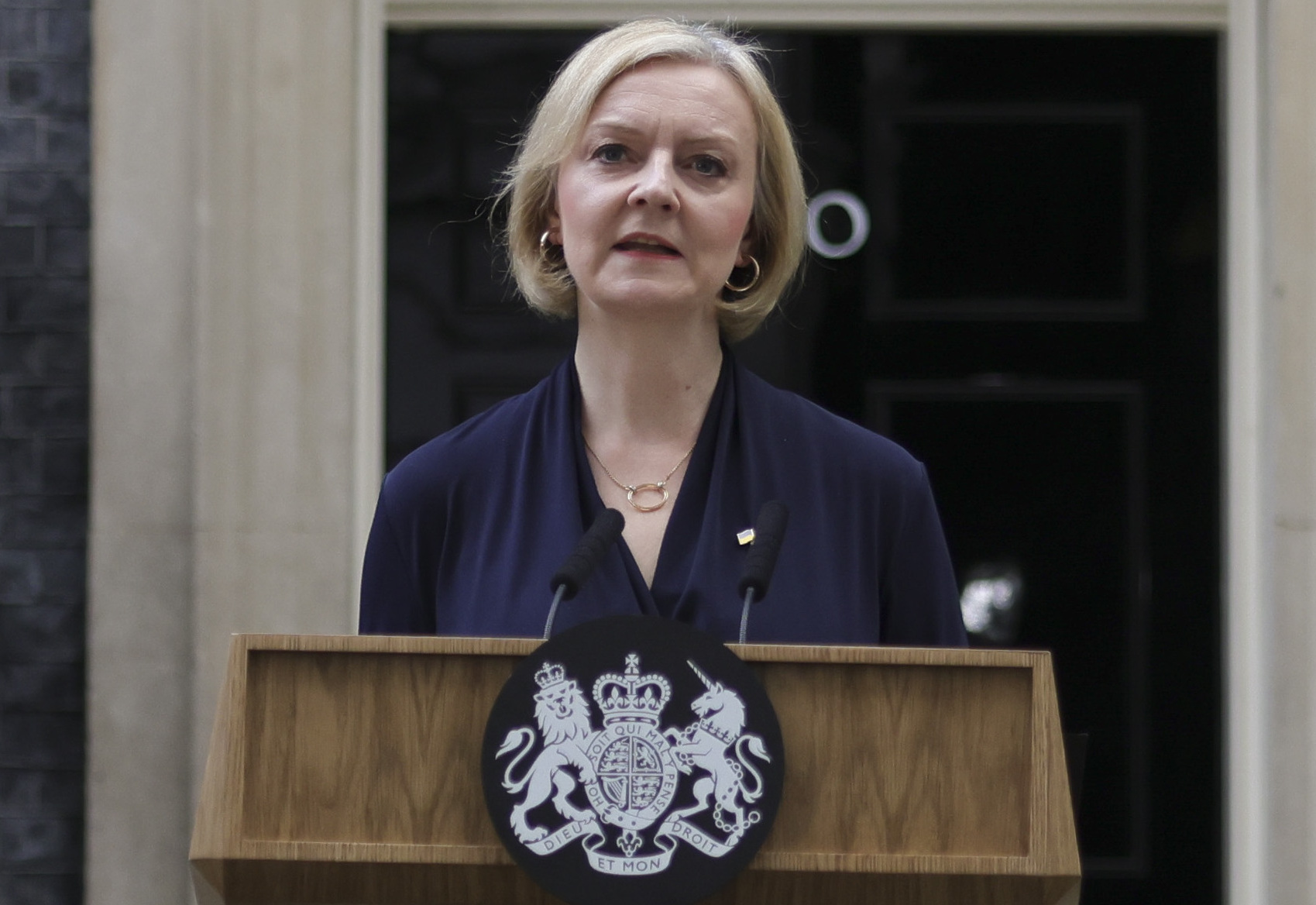
- Liz Truss announcing her intention to resign as Conservative leader on 20 October 2022
- Date: 14–20 October 2022
- Cause: September 2022 mini-budget; Loss of support from Conservative MPs; Confusion over a parliamentary vote to ban fracking
- Motive: Pressure Liz Truss to resign; Trigger a new Conservative Party leadership election
- Participants: Conservative Party MPs
- Outcome: Resignations of two holders of the Great Offices of State; Resignation of Liz Truss; October 2022 Conservative Party leadership election

In September and October 2022, the Conservative Party government led by newly appointed Prime Minister Liz Truss faced a credibility crisis. It was caused by the September 2022 mini-budget and a disorganised vote in the House of Commons over a parliamentary motion to ban fracking, ultimately resulting in the loss of support of Conservative members of parliament (MPs).

The mini-budget was a ministerial statement entitled "The Growth Plan" delivered by the Chancellor of the Exchequer, Kwasi Kwarteng, to the House of Commons on 23 September. It was received negatively by global financial markets and ultimately led to the dismissal of Kwarteng on 14 October. In the following days, Truss came under increasing pressure to reverse further elements of the mini-budget to satisfy the markets and, by 17 October, five Conservative MPs had called for her resignation. On 19 October, Suella Braverman, the Home Secretary, resigned over a breach of the Ministerial Code following a disagreement with Truss over immigration reform; her resignation letter was critical of the government.

On the evening of 19 October, MPs voted on a Labour Party motion to create time to debate a ban on fracking in the UK, which was opposed by the government. It was unclear whether the vote was being treated as a confidence vote by the government, which confused Conservative MPs. The confusion was compounded by speculation that Wendy Morton and Craig Whittaker, respectively the chief whip and deputy chief whip, had resigned, and by allegations, later refuted, that some Conservative MPs had been manhandled in the division lobby.

Truss announced her intention to resign as prime minister on 20 October. She vacated the post on 25 October to be succeeded by Rishi Sunak, who ran unopposed in the ensuing Conservative Party leadership election. Truss was in office for 49 days, the shortest tenure of any UK prime minister. (Note: The second and final term of Arthur Wellesley, 1st Duke of Wellington, lasted 23 days, but his first term was 2 years, 233 days long.)

== Background ==
Truss had been elected as leader of the Conservative Party on 5 September at the culmination of a seven-week process, and was duly appointed as prime minister by Queen Elizabeth II on the following day, replacing Boris Johnson.

Two days after Truss was appointed, political activity was greatly reduced during the period of national mourning following the death of the Queen, between 8 and 19 September.

On 23 September, Kwasi Kwarteng delivered a Ministerial Statement entitled "The Growth Plan" to the House of Commons that was widely referred to as the mini-budget. This prompted significant negative market reaction, including the pound sterling falling to a record low against the US dollar and a sharp increase in the cost of government borrowing. On 14 October, Kwarteng returned early from meetings in the United States and Truss dismissed him as chancellor. He was replaced by Jeremy Hunt, who said on 17 October that most of the measures in the mini-budget would no longer be implemented.

According to The Daily Telegraph, there were at least five Conservative MPs calling for Truss's resignation by 17 October: Crispin Blunt, Andrew Bridgen, Angela Richardson, Charles Walker and Jamie Wallis. That evening, Truss said she was "sorry for the mistakes that have been made", but added that she remained "committed to the vision" and would lead the Conservatives into the next general election. However, this did not seem to calm the growing tensions in her party, with one Conservative MP remarking, “This is the first time I have ever heard a corpse deliver its own eulogy.” The following day Lord Frost, a Conservative peer, also called for Truss to resign.

Truss met with Graham Brady, the chair of the 1922 Committee, on 17 and 20 October. The meeting on 17 October was said to have caused Truss to miss an urgent question by opposition leader Keir Starmer about Kwarteng's departure. Truss's absence drew criticism from a number of MPs, including Starmer. Truss later appeared alongside Hunt during his economic statement to the House of Commons.

== Ministerial resignations and dismissals ==
Kwasi Kwarteng was dismissed as chancellor on 14 October, after 38 days in post, and he was succeeded by Jeremy Hunt. Chris Philp was also replaced by Edward Argar as chief secretary to the Treasury. On 19 October, Suella Braverman resigned as home secretary, and she was replaced by Grant Shapps.

== Parliament ==
I think it's a shambles and a disgrace ... I hope all those people that put Liz Truss into Number 10, I hope it was worth it ... because the damage they have done to our party is extraordinary.

— Charles Walker's remarks on the market fallout, subsequent government crisis and Conservative unpopularity.

On 19 October Ed Miliband, a Labour Party MP, tabled an opposition day motion on the subject of fracking. Truss pledged as part of her leadership campaign to lift the moratorium on fracking, yet some Conservative MPs had expressed concern about the change as it went against their 2019 manifesto. The motion was a Programme Order, which, if passed, would have bound the House to consider and hold a vote on a Bill banning fracking, under the rules and timetable set in the Order itself. As the motion would have allocated to the bill time otherwise reserved to the Government, the party whips strictly informed Conservative MPs to vote against it (a three-line whip). They were also informed that the vote would be treated as a matter of confidence.

As the day progressed, 10 Downing Street became increasingly concerned about the potential size of the rebellion among Conservative MPs and informed the climate minister, Graham Stuart, that the vote would no longer be treated as a matter of confidence. Although he subsequently relayed this to the House of Commons, the whips' office were not made aware of the change, resulting in confusion and disarray among Conservative MPs.

MPs must vote by walking through an aye lobby or a no lobby, and an unnamed Conservative MP described this part of the process as "chaos". In claims that were undermined by a subsequent Speaker's inquiry, Conservative whips were accused of manhandling and bullying backbenchers into voting against the motion; Labour MP Chris Bryant said that he saw MPs "physically manhandled through the voting lobby", mentioning deputy prime minister Thérèse Coffey and business secretary Jacob Rees-Mogg. During the vote the chief whip of the Conservative Party, Wendy Morton, and the deputy chief whip, Craig Whittaker, were believed to have resigned. Later that evening, the speaker Lindsay Hoyle tasked the Serjeant at Arms of the House of Commons and other parliamentary officials with investigating the allegations. The motion was defeated by a vote of 326–230, with 324 Conservative MPs opposing it. On 1 November, the investigation concluded that while the atmosphere had been "tense" during the fracking vote, there was no evidence of "undue influence" on MPs. Charles Walker called the Truss ministry "a shambles and a disgrace... utterly appalling", commenting of its supporters that he had "had enough of talentless people" for whom "it’s in their own personal interest to achieve a ministerial position".

During Prime Minister's Questions on 19 October, Keir Starmer, the Leader of the Opposition, questioned why Truss had not resigned, to which Truss responded: "I am a fighter and not a quitter." The next day, Truss announced that she would resign.

== Resignation ==
On 20 October, Truss stated her intention to resign as prime minister.

Truss, as a former prime minister, is eligible to draw on the Public Duty Costs Allowance. This allowance can pay up to £115,000 per year towards reimbursement of the authenticated costs former prime ministers face in continuing to fulfil the public duties associated with being a former prime minister. Keir Starmer said "She shouldn't take that entitlement. After 44 days she has not earned the right to that entitlement, she should turn it down". Fact-checking charity Full Fact noted the commonly mis-characterised nature of the allowance - it is not "salary” or a “pension”, and former prime ministers do not simply 'get' the money". Truss claimed £101,332 of this allowance in 2023-24 and £97,152 in 2024-25.

== Reactions ==
=== Opinion polls ===
Opinion polling showed a wide gap forming between the Conservative and Labour parties following the mini-budget.

A YouGov survey of Conservative Party members published on 18 October reported that a majority of them wanted Truss to resign. Boris Johnson was the most popular potential replacement, followed by Ben Wallace, Rishi Sunak, Penny Mordaunt, Kemi Badenoch, Jeremy Hunt and Suella Braverman.

=== Bookmakers ===
As of mid-October, bookmakers were taking odds for the date of Truss's resignation. Bookmakers placed Sunak first in their list of likely Conservative prime ministerial successors, followed by Hunt, Mordaunt, Wallace and Johnson.

=== Daily Star lettuce and tofu ===
On 11 October, The Economist published an article criticising Truss in which they compared the length of time she had control of the country to the shelf life of a lettuce. On 14 October, the Daily Star began a live stream of a lettuce dressed as Truss to see whether she would resign before the lettuce wilted. She did.

On 19 October, after Suella Braverman's resignation, the lettuce was filmed with a plate of tofu to mock the statement she had made the previous day which attacked climate-protest groups as "Guardian-reading, tofu-eating wokerati". The lettuce became well known; in an interview with Sky News, Labour MP Chris Bryant said that "the lettuce might as well be running the country, or the tofu".

== See also ==
- 1940 British war cabinet crisis
- United Kingdom cost-of-living crisis
- 2022 Northern Ireland political crisis
- Confidence motions in the United Kingdom
- List of prime ministers of the United Kingdom by length of tenure
- Motion (parliamentary procedure)
