= 2023 United Kingdom budget =

- Presented: 15 March 2023
- Country: United Kingdom
- Parliament: 58th
- Party: Conservative Party
- Chancellor: Jeremy Hunt
- Website: Budget 2023

The 2023 United Kingdom budget was delivered to the House of Commons on 15 March 2023 by Chancellor of the Exchequer Jeremy Hunt. It was the first of two full budget statements presented during the Sunak ministry. It was also the first full budget statement to be presented by Hunt since his appointment as chancellor, and the first since the October 2021 United Kingdom budget presented by then-Chancellor Rishi Sunak. The date of the budget was confirmed by Hunt on 19 December 2022. At the same time he confirmed the budget would be accompanied by a full budget report from the Office for Budget Responsibility. The statement was presented as a budget for growth, with the objective of bringing about the conditions for long-term sustainable economic growth within the UK.

The UK had narrowly avoided going into recession at the end of 2022, and although there were some signs of recovery during the weeks preceding the budget, inflation remained high and the country continued to be impacted by an ongoing cost of living crisis. In his statement, Hunt set out plans to remove barriers to employment (with measures such as an increase in the amount of free childcare), encourage business investment (with measures including a programme of tax cuts for business worth £27bn), and address labour shortages in some industries (such as the construction sector). Government help for families facing financial pressure was also extended, with the Energy Price Guarantee extended for a further three months. The cap on the lifetime allowance for tax-free pensions contributions was also abolished in an attempt to encourage workers such as NHS doctors and consultants to remain in employment longer.

The budget was criticised by Sir Keir Starmer, the Leader of the Opposition, who accused the Conservatives of turning the UK back into the "sick man of Europe", while Rachel Reeves, the Shadow Chancellor, said that Labour would reverse the pension tax changes. Stephen Flynn, the Leader of the Scottish National Party at Westminster, highlighted what he believed was the lack of support for families struggling financially. The pension tax changes were welcomed by the British Medical Association, who described it as "potentially transformative for the NHS". The BBC's Laura Kuenssberg questioned whether some of the measures, such as the plans to increase childcare, could be achieved, and suggested the government would be "punished" if they were not.

== Background ==
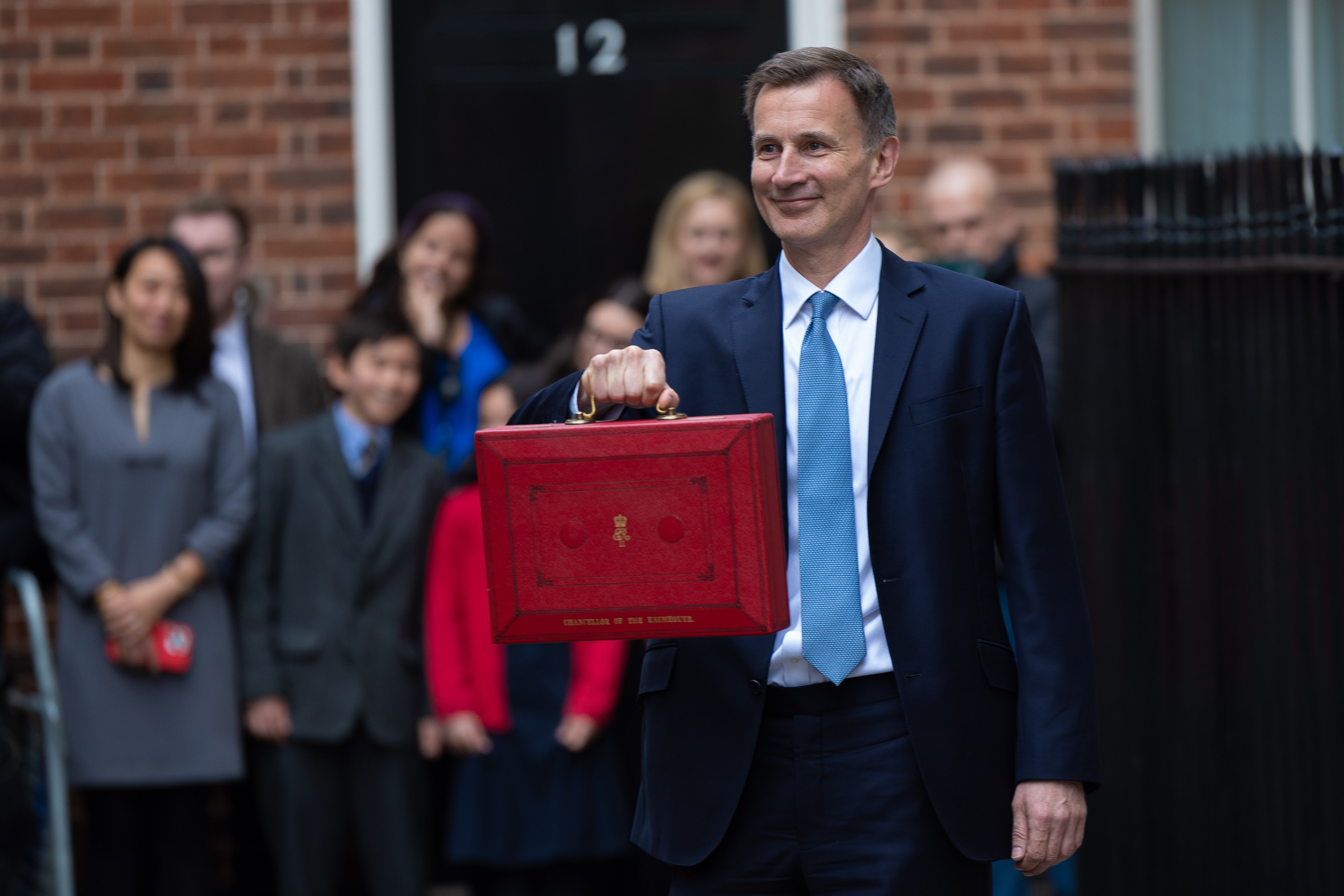
Jeremy Hunt presenting the Spring Budget

Jeremy Hunt was appointed as Chancellor following the economic crisis brought about by the mini-budget of September 2022 and the subsequent resignation of his predecessor, Kwasi Kwarteng. Kwarteng had outlined a programme of unfunded tax cuts worth £45bn, most of which was reversed by Hunt as a result of a negative market reaction that undermined confidence in the UK economy. After taking office in October 2022, Hunt outlined an autumn statement the following month, which was a budget in everything but name, and included measures to lessen the impact of a potential recession. On 19 December, he confirmed the next budget, which he described as a "full fat budget", would be presented on 15 March 2023, and that unlike the September budget, it would be accompanied by a report from the Office for Budget Responsibility.

The March 2023 budget was presented against a backdrop of high inflation and weak economic growth, a cost of living crisis that had squeezed household budgets, ongoing strike action in a number of sectors, and concerns about a potential recession. Although the predicted recession did not occur, data released by the Office for National Statistics on 10 February 2023 indicated the UK had narrowly avoided a recession at the end of 2022 following zero per cent growth during October to December. This was also despite a fall in output of 0.5% during December due to strike action being staged by various sectors prior to Christmas. Data released on 10 March indicated the UK economy had grown by 0.3% in January 2023, much more than the 0.1% that was predicted by economists. On 15 February, data indicated that inflation fallen for the third consecutive month, from 10.5% to 10.1%. This was mainly due to a decrease in fuel, restaurant, and hotel prices, according to the Office for National Statistics. But food inflation remained high, at 16.7%. Pay, excluding bonuses, rose at an annual pace of 6.7% from October to December 2022, and when inflation was taken into account, regular pay fell by 2.5%.

During a discussion about energy bill help in February 2023, Hunt told the BBC households were unlikely to receive extra help with their energy bills from April 2023, as he did not think the government had the "headroom to make a major new initiative to help people". The Energy Price Guarantee, announced the previous September, was later extended until 30 June 2023.

== The budget ==
In his first full budget speech since becoming Chancellor, Hunt set out what was described as a budget for growth, aimed at achieving long-term, sustainable economic growth for the UK. Its main objectives were to remove barriers to employment, encourage business investment, and address labour shortages in some industries. The Chancellor also announced a programme of tax cuts for business worth £27bn, as well as extending government help for families facing financial pressure as a result of the cost of living crisis.

During his speech, Hunt confirmed that the Office for Budget Responsibility had predicted the UK would avoid entering recession during 2023, but that the economy would shrink by 0.2%. Economic growth of 1.8% was predicted for 2024, rising to 2.5% in 2025 then falling slightly to 2.1% in 2026. The UK's rate of inflation was predicted to fall to 2.9% by the end of 2023, down from 10.7% in the final three months of 2022, while underlying debt was forecast to be 92.4% of GDP in 2023, rising to 93.7% in 2024. Government borrowing for 2022–23 was forecast to be £152bn.

=== Key points ===
- Corporation Tax for business with profits over £250,000 to increase from 19% to 25% from April 2023.
- Companies with profits between £50,000 and £250,000 to pay between 19% and 25% in Corporation Tax from April 2023.
- Companies can offset the cost of machinery and new technology to reduce their taxable profits.
- £80m announced for 12 new investment zones where companies will enjoy tax breaks and other benefits.
- Reduced paperwork for companies trading overseas, with them also given longer to submit paperwork to HM Customs.
- Prison sentences announced for anyone convicted of marketing a tax avoidance scheme.
- A commitment to spend an extra £11bn on defence over the next five years.
- Local authorities in England to receive an extra £200m during 2023 to help repair potholes.
- An extra £10m over two years for charities helping to prevent suicide.
- £900m for a new supercomputer to support the UK's Artificial intelligence sector.
- Abolishing the former cap on maximum amount of pension savings before it is taxed, which was £1.07 million.
- A process is announced to speed up the approval of new medical products.
- Increasing of the tax-free yearly allowance for pensions from £40,000 to £60,000.
- Extension of the Energy Price Guarantee until 30 June 2023.
- An extra £200m to reduce charges for energy prepayment metres and bring them in line with direct debit payments, affecting around four million households.
- The extension on the freeze on fuel duty, for another year, until April 2024.
- £20bn to be invested in low carbon energy projects over the next two decades, with a focus on carbon capture and storage.
- New investment for nuclear energy, which will be classed as environmentally sustainable for investment.
- £63m to be invested in helping leisure centres with the rising cost of heating swimming pools, as well as to become more energy efficient.
- 30 hours of free childcare for parents in England with children over the age of nine months to be phased in from April 2024 to September 2025, starting with 15 hours of childcare for children over the age of two in April 2024, and 15 hours for children over nine months from September 2024.
- Families on Universal Credit to have their childcare support paid in advance rather than in arrears, with the monthly £645 payment for each child to rise to £951.
- People to be offered a £600 "incentive" to become childminders, with the rules on the number of children who can be looked after by a childminder in England to be relaxed.
- A new fitness-to-work regime announced for people to qualify for health related benefits.
- Announcement of Universal Support, a new voluntary work programme for disabled people in England and Wales.
- Lead child carers on Universal Credit will face tougher requirements to look for work and increased job support.
- A £63m programme is announced to encouraged retirees over 50 to return to work.
- Immigration rules for construction sector to be relaxed to plug a shortage of workers in the industry.
- An extra £230m allocated for Scotland.
- An additional £180m allocated for Wales.
- Relief for bars on tax rises on alcohol.
- Above inflation tax increases on tobacco, with hand-rolled tobacco having the highest tax rise (a 6% above inflation rise).

== Reaction ==
In his response to the budget statement, Sir Keir Starmer, the leader of the Labour Party and leader of the Opposition, accused the Conservatives of turning the United Kingdom back into the "Sick man of Europe" after presiding over more than a decade of economic stagnation and low wages: "Like millions across our country, this budget leaves us stuck in the waiting room, with only a sticking plaster to hand. A country set on a path of managed decline, falling behind our competitors; the 'sick man of Europe' once again." He also highlighted a forecast from the Office for Budget Responsibility that predicted living standards in the UK would fall to their lowest since records began.

Labour went on to criticise Hunt's decision to abolish the cap on the lifetime allowance for tax-free pensions contributions, claiming it "could see the richest one per cent of those accessing their pensions next year net an average of £45,000". Rachel Reeves, the Shadow Chancellor of the Exchequer, said that Labour would reverse the changes, which Hunt claimed would encourage workers, such as NHS doctors and consultants, to stay in their jobs longer. Reeves announced that Labour would instead create a specific scheme for doctors rather than a "free-for-all for the wealthy few". But Labour were accused of exaggerating the figures. David Robbins, director of WTW, told The Financial Times the calculated tax saving for someone with £1.4mn of pension savings would be "less than one-third as big" as Labour had forecast. The policy was welcomed by the British Medical Association, who described it as "potentially transformative for the NHS".

Nicola Sturgeon, the outgoing First Minister of Scotland, welcomed the additional £230m announced for Scotland, but said it would still place great financial constraints on the Scottish Government. Speaking on the 16 March edition of BBC One's Question Time, Stephen Flynn, the leader of the Scottish National Party in the House of Commons, highlighted what he felt was the lack of support for families struggling with the rising cost of living: "[P]eople can't afford to pay their energy bills. They can't afford to pay their mortgages; they can't afford to pay their rent. They can't afford to pay their food bills; they can't afford, some of them, to put clothes on their kids' backs or shoes on their kids' feet. And the Chancellor's answer to that was to keep energy bills at an astronomically high level while stealthily taking 400 pounds away through the energy rebate scheme. He wants old people and disabled people to pull up their socks and have an MOT and go back to work. He wants to give the richest people in society a tax break on their pensions. What planet do these people live on?" Mark Drakeford, the First Minister of Wales and leader of Welsh Labour, described it as a "less than a bare minimum budget".

There was also some criticism from backbenchers within Hunt's own party, with Jacob Rees-Mogg leading Conservative criticism of the budget, particularly over the decision to increase Corporation Tax by 6%, something he said would make the UK "less competitive".

The BBC's Laura Kuenssberg noted the fairly uneventful reaction to the 2023 budget when compared to the criticism that had greeted the statements delivered in 2012 and March 2017, but questioned how easy it would be for Prime Minister Rishi Sunak to deliver on the promises that had been made. Highlighting the plans for expanding childcare, she observed that the number of available nursery places had been decreasing in recent years: "Ministers are aware that it could be a stretch: that is why the changes are being phased in gradually. But if the promise of more gleaming nurseries, happy toddlers and less-stressed parents is not matched by reality, the government may be punished."

== Aftermath ==
On 22 March, data released by the Office for National Statistics showed an unexpected increased in inflation for February, from 10.1% to 10.4%, largely as a result of an increase in the cost of fresh food (particularly vegetables), non-alcoholic drinks, restaurant meals, and women's clothes. In response to this news, Hunt said that reducing inflation from "dangerously high levels" was the government's priority. The following day, the Bank of England raised its baseline interest rate for the 11th consecutive time, from 4% to 4.25%, in response to the unexpected growth of inflation. Despite the increase, Andrew Bailey, the Bank's Governor, said that he was "much more hopeful" for the prospects of the UK economy. Hunt said the government supported the Bank's decision, but Reeves said a higher interest rate would cause concern to families struggling with the cost of living.

Office for National Statistics data released on 31 March revised the economic growth figures for the end of 2022, and showed the UK economy grew by 0.1% in the final three months of 2022, meaning the UK had avoided recession. Hunt said the figures "show there's underlying resilience in the UK economy".

On 25 April, data published by the Office for National Statistics indicated that government borrowing for the year up to 31 March 2023 had been £139.2bn, and consequently less than the £152bn forecast prior to the 2023 budget.

On 2 January 2024, applications opened for working parents in England to apply for 15 hours per week of funded childcare for two-year-olds, starting from April 2024.
