= Chote =

Chote is a surname. Notable people with the surname include:

- Beth Chote (born 1991), New Zealand actress
- David Chote, New Zealand soccer player
- Morville Chote (1924–2023), British javelin thrower
- Robert Chote (born 1968), British economist
- Sophia Chote, Trinidad and Tobago politician
