= Kevin Daly (economist) =

British economist

Kevin John Daly

Chair, Society of Professional Economists
- In office 2016–2021
- Preceded by: Kate Barker
- Succeeded by: George Buckley

Personal details
- Born: 5 June 1973 (age 53) United Kingdom
- Occupation: Economist

Academic background
- Education: Gonville and Caius College, Cambridge; University College London; Trinity College Dublin

Academic work
- Discipline: Economics
- Sub-discipline: Macroeconomics; Monetary Economics

Kevin John Daly OBE (born 5 June 1973) is a British-Irish economist. He was the chair of the UK's Society of Professional Economists (SPE) from 2016 to 2021. He is also co-head of CEEMEA Economics in Goldman Sachs, a member of the advisory panel to the UK's Office for Budget Responsibility and of a steering group of independent experts advising the UK Statistics Authority.

== Early life ==
Daly was born in the United Kingdom in June 1973, before moving to Ireland as a child. He obtained an MA in economics from Gonville and Caius College, Cambridge, an MSc, with distinction, in Economics from University College London and a PhD in economics from Trinity College Dublin, where his supervisor was Philip Lane.

== Career ==
Daly was elected to the Council of the Society of Professional Economists in 2007 and became chair of the society in 2016, succeeding Dame Kate Barker in that role. He remained in that role until 2021. During his time as chair, the Society changed its name, launched a professional development programme, and increased its full membership by one-third while adding 650 student members.

Daly joined Goldman Sachs in 2001 and was named managing director in 2010. In 2011, he became Goldman's UK Chief Economist, succeeding Ben Broadbent in that role. In 2016, he was appointed co-head of Goldman's CEEMEA economics team.

== Other ==
Daly is a Fellow of the Academy of Social Sciences.

He won the SPE's Rybczynski Essay Prize, established in memory of the economist and former chair of the society Tadeusz Rybczynski, in 2004 and 2007.

He has appeared as an expert witness before the House of Commons Treasury Select Committee and the House of Lords European Union Committee.

Daly was previously a winner for the Economic Research Council's 'Clash of the Titans' forecasting competition, defeating Stephen King and Baroness Ros Altmann.

He was appointed Officer of the Order of the British Empire in the 2023 Birthday Honours for services to economics.
