= Society of Professional Economists =

The Society of Professional Economists is a British network of professional economists. Its members are drawn from all areas of the discipline including financial and professional services, business, journalism, government, consultancy, business schools and universities. Membership is open to anyone who has a degree with substantial economic content and/or works in an area of economic endeavour or investigation.

The Society of Professional Economists organises networking events, professional development and education as well as conferences and an annual dinner. It provides a monthly newsletter including book reviews and provides a forum for members to advertise job opportunities and their own events. The Society also offers student and graduate memberships.

It was known as the Business Economists Group from its founding in 1953, and as the Society of Business Economists from its incorporation in 1960 until February 2018.

== Activities ==
=== Monthly meetings ===
Monthly meetings typically run from September to July at lunchtime or in the evening in London. Distinguished speakers from the UK and abroad and from both the private and public sectors address a wide range of topical issues with time for questions and discussion. Evening meetings are followed by drinks and the opportunity to network with other SPE members from a wide range of organisations.

Post-fiscal event briefings are held with HM Treasury following Budgets and Spring/Autumn Statements. They offer SPE members the opportunity to discuss the macroeconomic aspects of what has been announced, and UK fiscal policy more generally.

=== Annual conferences ===
Recent annual conferences have featured Ben Broadbent, Sir Charles Bean, Robert Chote, Gavyn Davies, Dame DeAnne Julius, Diane Coyle, Evan Davies, Stephanie Flanders, Philip Lane and Sir Dave Ramsden.

=== Annual dinners ===
SPE annual dinners attract high-profile national and international guest speakers. Past speakers have included Mark Carney, Sir John Vickers, Sir Gus O’Donnell, Sir Howard Davies, Jean-Claude Trichet, Mario Draghi, William C Dudley, Axel Weber, Christian Noyer and James Bullard. The guest speaker for 2019 was George Osborne.

=== Masterclasses ===
Masterclasses on current issues and new developments contribute to continuing professional development. Members use these events to refresh or update their knowledge, and provide further opportunities to get to know other members and build networks.

=== Professional development ===
The SPE runs a Continuous Professional Development Programme and a series of masterclasses presented by leading lights in their field.

=== Recruitment ===
The SPE has an active jobs board. A large number of employers and recruiters advertise job opportunities for economists through the society, including a monthly email of listings.

=== Rybzcynski prize ===
This prize is awarded annually by the society to the author of the year's best piece of writing on an issue of importance to professional economists. Tad Rybzcynski (1923-1998) was famous for developing a theorem concerning how changes in an endowment affect output and prices.

=== Publications and podcasts ===
The Society produces a monthly newsletter, regular book reviews, an annual salary survey, alongside reports from and webcasts about its events. In addition, there are regular interviews with leading economists in the UK and overseas on a wide range of topics, which are recorded and stored on the SPE website.

== History ==
The Society of Professional Economists was initially established as The Business Economists Group in 1953. When Sir Campbell Fraser of the Economist Intelligence Unit, with the aid of three of his own colleagues as well as John Dixon of Dunlop and Clive Dalton of Esso, set up a meeting with a view to establishing a small group of economists working in business. The group wanted to discuss professional challenges in responding to the UK's relatively poor post-war economic recovery.

The first Business Economists Group meeting took place in 1953, in the St Ermin's Hotel in Westminster, London. The attendance list shows there were thirty-three attendees: thirteen from industry, seven from consultancies and market research organisations, three from financial sectors, and one from the National Institute for Economic and Social Research. The remaining six were from government organisations. The aim of this first meeting was to:

- Discuss the divergence between the real world challenges and economic theory.
- Keep up-to-date with developments in economic theory.
- Exchange views and analyse government policies, trends and current affairs.
- Develop a ‘group’ that could facilitate the exchange of ideas and experiences and so mitigate professional isolation.
- Provide professional standards for business economists and promote the interests of the ‘groups’ members.
- The Society's aims in the 21st century remain largely unchanged but reflect the reality of economics as it is now practiced professionally and the needs of economists to network and engage in lively debate across many platforms in order to keep on top of the rapid developments in the subject area.

== Membership ==
The Society of Professional Economists is a membership organisation. Its members are drawn from all areas of economics, including financial and professional services, business, journalism, government, consultancy, business schools and universities. Membership is open to anyone who has a degree with substantial economic content and/or works in an area of economic endeavour or investigation.

It has four types of members: Full members, student members, graduate members and Fellowships which are awarded at the discretion of the Council.

Notable members include:

- Vicky Pryce
- DeAnne Julius
- Lord Burns
- Richard O'Brien
- Bridget Rosewell
- Diane Coyle

Past members include:

- David Walton

== Governance ==
The SPE is governed by a council of 12 elected members, with all full members and fellows eligible for election.

=== Presidents and vice presidents ===
The Chairman, President and Vice Presidents are elected by council members. The current President is Sir Dave Ramsden CBE. Vice Presidents are Sir Charlie Bean, Dame Kate Barker and Sir John Vickers. The current Chairman of the SPE Council is George Buckley.

=== Current Council members ===
George Buckley (Chair 2021- present), James Lambert (Treasurer), Andrew Milligan (Honorary Secretary), Leath Al Obaidi, Catherine Connolly, Filippo Gaddo, Sarah Hewin, Ian Kernohan, Donna Leong, Lucy Meakin, Mario Pisani, Sonali Punhani.
