= Andrew Sentance =

British economist (born 1958)

Dr Andrew Sentance CBE
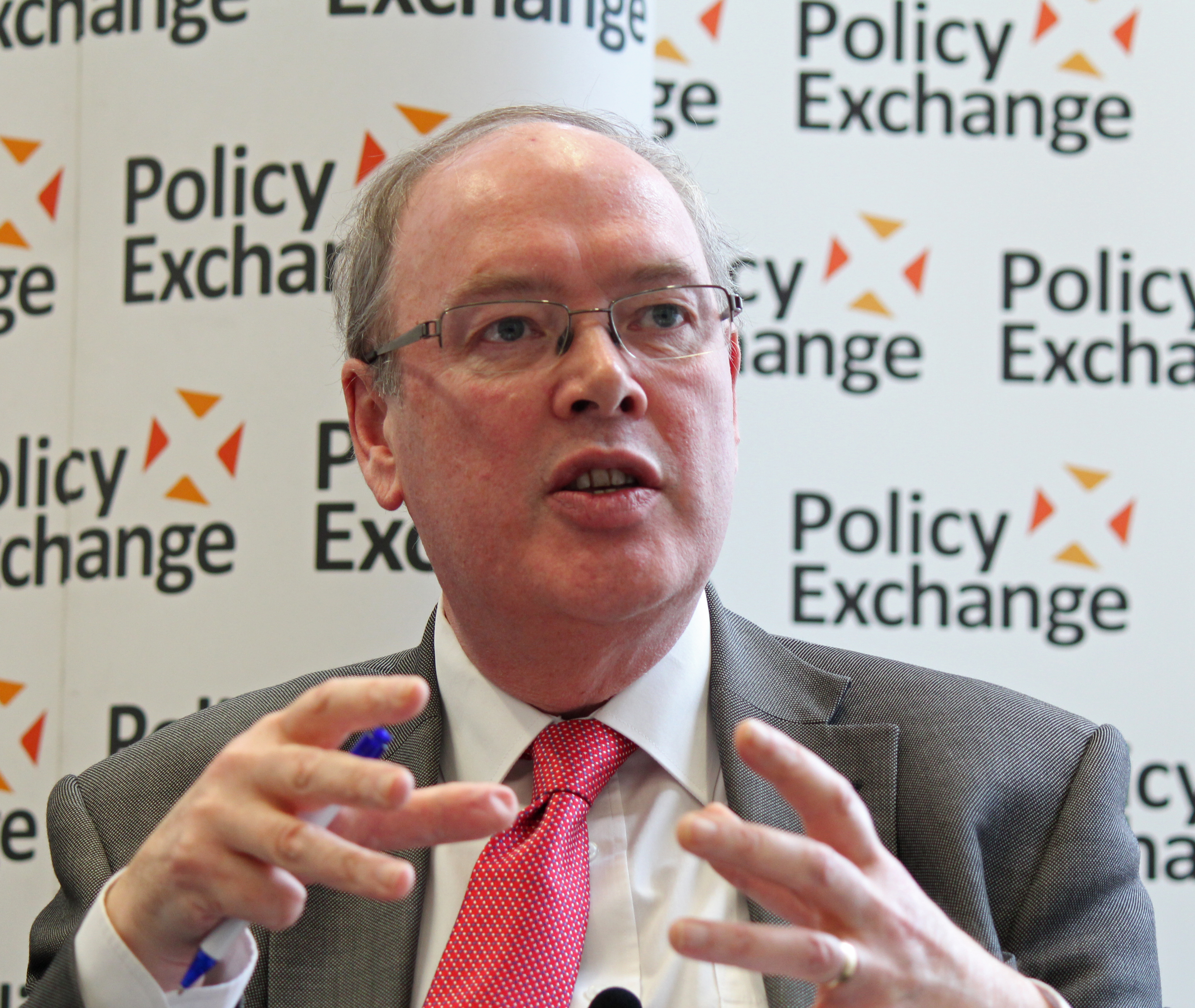
- Sentance speaking at Policy Exchange, February 2014

Member of the Monetary Policy Committee
- In office October 2006 – May 2011
- Governor: Mervyn King

Personal details
- Education: Clare College, Cambridge (BA, MA); London School of Economics (MSc, PhD)
- Profession: Economist
- Website: www.andrewsentance.com

Andrew Sentance CBE (born September 1958) is a British business economist. He was a Senior Adviser to Cambridge Econometrics from October 2019 to September 2023. From November 2011 until October 2018, he was Senior Economic Adviser to PwC. He was an external member of the Monetary Policy Committee of the Bank of England from October 2006 to May 2011 and is a former Chief Economist at British Airways and Director of Economic Affairs at the CBI.

== Education ==
Sentance was born in Bebington on the Wirral and grew up in south-east London. He was educated at Eltham College, Clare College, Cambridge, and the London School of Economics. At Eltham College, he studied economics, mathematics and history at A Level, and at Clare College gained a Bachelor of Arts (B.A.) with honours (2.1) in economics, graduating in 1980. His postgraduate studies were carried out at the London School of Economics, completing a Master of Science (M.Sc.) in economics in 1982, and a Doctor of Philosophy (Ph.D.) in 1987 with the thesis The Government as employer: a macroeconomic analysis.

From 2006 until 2023, he was a part-time professor of practice at the University of Warwick, based at Warwick Business School, and he holds a visiting professorship at Royal Holloway, University of London. He was awarded an honorary D.Sc. by the University of London in 2008 and an honorary Doctorate of Business Administration by Anglia Ruskin University in 2017. He is also a former vice-president and former chairman of the Society of Business Economists.

== Career ==
Before joining the Bank of England, Sentance held various economic positions. He was head of economic policy and director of economic affairs at the CBI, where he worked from September 1986 until December 1993. In January 1994, he joined London Business School, where he was a senior research fellow and subsequently director of the Centre for Economic Forecasting.

In 1998, he joined British Airways, where he was chief economist and head of environmental affairs. He was one of the five senior managers appointed in 2001 to prepare the company's "Future Size and Shape" turnaround plan, and chaired the investment committee of the BA Pension Funds from 2002 until 2006.

In November 2011, Sentance joined Pricewaterhouse Coopers (PwC) as their senior economic adviser. He retired from PwC at the end of October 2018 and joined Cambridge Econometrics as a part-time Senior Adviser in October 2019, retiring in September 2023.

== Advice to government ==
Sentance was a founder member of the Treasury's Panel of Independent Forecasters which provided advice to the Chancellor of the Exchequer during the Conservative Government in the 1990s. He also acted as a government adviser on official statistics and corporate social responsibility in the 1990s and 2000s. He was appointed to the Monetary Policy Committee of the Bank of England by the Chancellor of the Exchequer in 2006, and served on the Committee from 1 October 2006 until 31 May 2011. He was regarded as an inflation hawk on the MPC, arguing unsuccessfully for interest rate rises from June 2010 until his term ended in May 2011. He was replaced by Ben Broadbent.

He is a former member of the Commission for Integrated Transport (2006–10) and also acted as an expert adviser to the Department for Transport on the framework of regulation for UK airports. He was a member of the Green Fiscal Commission (2007–09) and in 2010/11 chaired a UK Government expert group on the International Dimensions of Climate Change. In 2017 and 2018, he was chairman of the Essex Economic Commission.

Sentance was appointed Commander of the Order of the British Empire (CBE) in the 2012 New Year Honours for services to the economy.

In early 2019 Sentance criticized the Bank of England's 'doomsday scenario report on Brexit'. He told MPs that the report was 'extreme' and 'implausible' and he queried to what extent the Bank was independent from the Government whilst Mark Carney was in charge.

== Criticism ==
The economist Paul Krugman criticized an article Sentance wrote in London's Financial Times on 21 September 2015, which opposed the US Federal Open Market Committee's decision not to raise interest rates. Krugman writes:

What makes the piece so remarkable is that there isn't so much as a nod to what you might have thought was the standard approach to monetary policy; not only has Sentance made up his own version of macroeconomics, he's evidently completely unaware that he has done so.

According to Krugman, Sentance criticizes the Fed for its shifting arguments against raising rates ("sluggish growth in all the major western economies in 2011-12; the euro crisis in 2013-14; and now the Fed is citing weak economic growth in China and the impact this has on financial markets") and says: "If you look around hard enough, there can always be a reason for not raising interest rates." Krugman points out that Sentance never once mentions that, according to Krugman, US "inflation is still below the Fed's target, and shows no sign of rising".

== Personal life ==
Andrew Sentance is married with two adult children and two young grandsons. His main interest outside work is music. He plays the piano, organ, guitar and bass guitar and he is a former member of a band called 'Revelation'. He is also involved in local church music in the area around Broxbourne, Hertfordshire, where he now lives. Since 2019, he has played the organ regularly and acted as Director of Music in the Parish of Bengeo near Hertford. Sentance takes a keen interest in environmental affairs and also in charity work: he is a former trustee of Build It International, a development charity, and a former trustee of the charity Harvest Help (now known as Self Help Africa) as well as a former trustee of the Anglo-German Foundation. He is also a former Chair and Trustee of the Templefields Multi-Academy Trust, which oversees three primary schools in Harlow, Essex.
