= Dave Ramsden =

British economist

Sir David Ramsden CBE
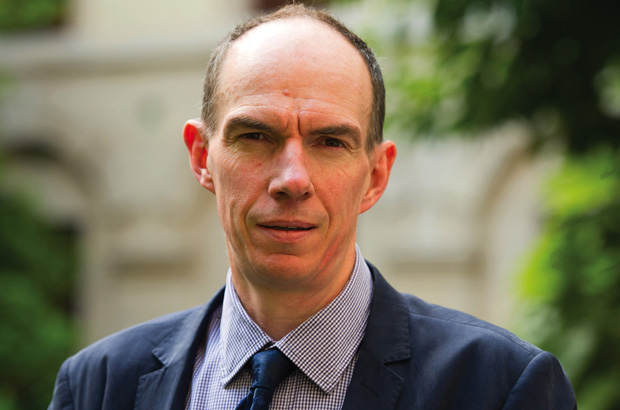

Deputy Governor of the Bank of England for Markets and Banking
- Incumbent
- Assumed office 2017
- Governor: Mark Carney; Andrew Bailey
- Preceded by: Minouche Shafik

Personal details
- Born: David Edward John Ramsden; 9 February 1964 (age 62)
- Spouse: Niccola Shearman (after 1993)
- Children: 2
- Education: Brasenose College, Oxford (BA); London School of Economics (MSc)

Sir David Edward John Ramsden CBE (born 9 February 1964) is a British economist and has been Deputy Governor for Markets and Banking at the Bank of England since 4 September 2017. He was previously Chief Economic Adviser to HM Treasury and Head of the Government Economic Service, having previously served as Joint Head of the Service with Vicky Pryce, formerly Chief Economic Adviser and Director-General at the Department for Business, Innovation and Skills.

== Early life ==
Ramsden was born on 9 February 1964 and is the son of William Ramsden, OBE and of Elizabeth Ramsden (now Thompson).

He was educated at Brasenose College, Oxford and graduated from the London School of Economics with an MSc Economics in 1990 and married his wife, Dr. Niccola Shearman, in 1993. Niccola, a graduate of Oxford University, the UCL Institute of Education, and the Courtauld Institute of Art, is an academic lecturer.

== Career ==
Ramsden joined the Civil Service in 1986 before joining the Treasury in 1988. He has worked on a wide range of economic policy issues, including monetary policy, fiscal and tax policy, the public finances, the business sector and labour markets.

Between 1999 and 2003, Ramsden led the Treasury's work on whether the UK should join the Euro. He worked on tax administration and policy issues from 2003 until 2006.

In June 2007, Ramsden joined the Treasury Board and in 2008 he was appointed Chief Economic Adviser. He became Joint Head of the Government Economic Service, the largest single recruiter of economists in the UK, from 2007; sole Head in 2010. In January 2013 he became Chair of the Treasury’s Diversity Board.

Ramsden is a trustee of Pro-Bono Economics, a charity whose aim is to broker economists into the charitable sector to help on short and medium-term assignments, typically addressing questions around measurement, results and impact. He is also President of the Society of Professional Economists.

In 2015 he also became a visiting professor at King's College London.

In 2017 he was appointed Deputy Governor for Markets and Banking at the Bank of England.

In 2019 he was appointed President of the Money Macro and Finance Society, succeeding Charles Goodhart.

=== Honours and awards ===
For his work on whether the UK should join the Euro, he was appointed CBE. He was knighted in the 2015 New Year Honours for services to economic policy making.

Government offices
Preceded by New position	Director General, Economics & Fiscal Groups, Chief Economic Adviser to the Treasury; HM Treasury; 2010-2017	Succeeded by
Government offices
Preceded by New position	Managing Director, Macroeconomic and Fiscal Policy; HM Treasury; 2007-2017	Succeeded by
Preceded by Sir Nicholas Stern	Head of the Government Economic Service jointly with Vicky Pryce until June 2010; 2007-2017	Succeeded by Sam Beckett and Clare Lombardelli
