= Vicky Pryce =

British economist (born 1952)

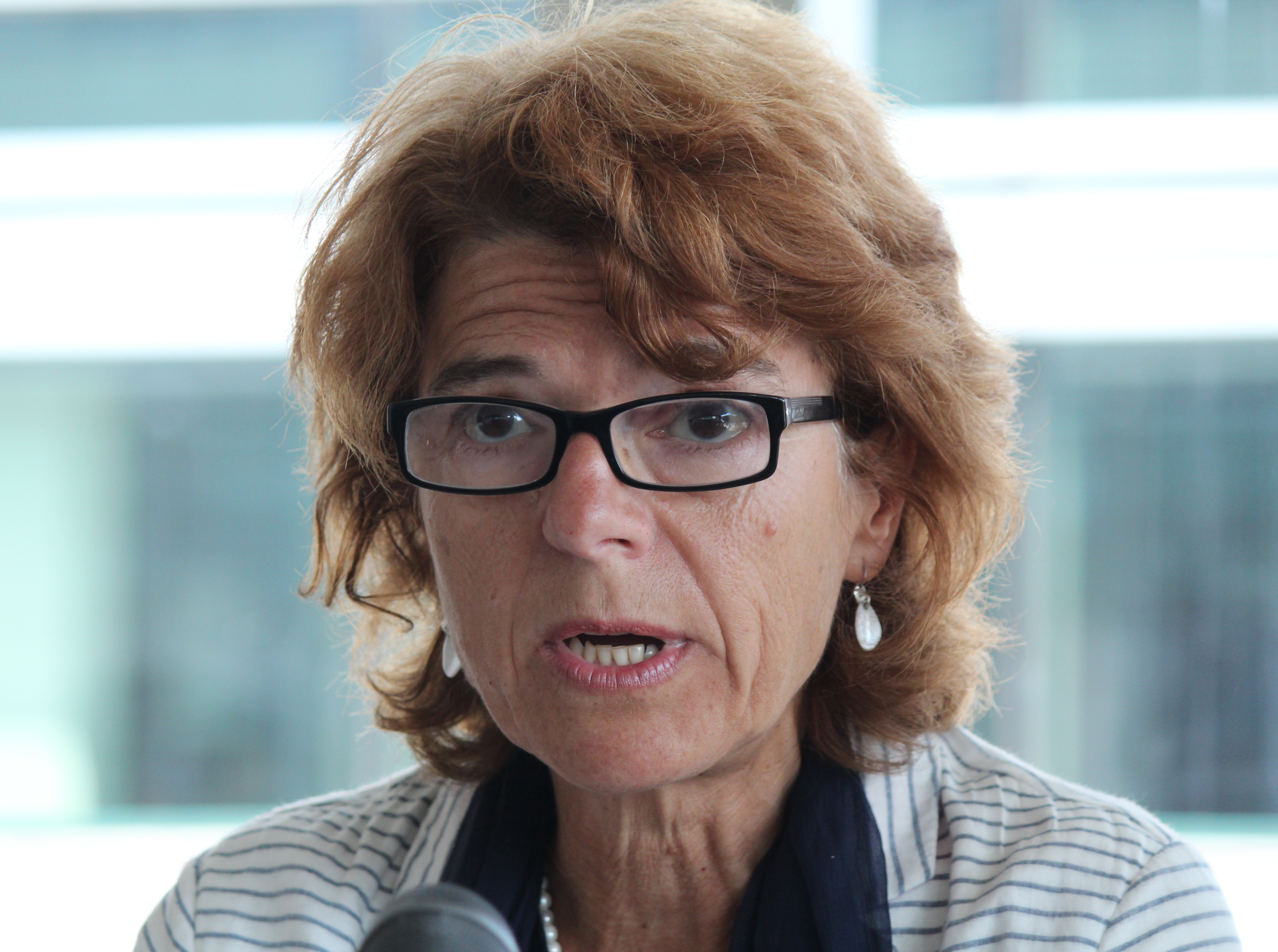
- Pryce in 2014
- Born: Vasiliki Kourmouzi; 15 July 1952 (age 74); Athens, Greece
- Education: London School of Economics
- Occupation: Economist
- Spouses: Gareth Pryce (m. 1972; div. 1981) Chris Huhne (m. 1984; div. 2011)
- Partner: Denis MacShane (2012–present)
- Children: 5

Vasiliki "Vicky" Pryce (née Kourmouzi (Greek: Βασιλική Κουρμούζη); born 15 July 1952) is a Greek-born British economist and a former Joint Head of the United Kingdom's Government Economic Service.

She is the Chief Economic Adviser at the Centre for Economics and Business Research, in London, where she is also a board member. In 2023, Pryce joined the British Chambers of Commerce's newly-launched Economic Advisory Council as a senior member. She is a visiting professor at Birmingham City University and King's College London.

On 7 March 2013, she and her former husband, Chris Huhne, were convicted of perverting the course of justice and sentenced to eight months in prison, when she was convicted after trial and Huhne pleaded guilty. They each served nine weeks in prison.

== Early life ==
Pryce was born in Athens, the middle of three children, described as being "out on the town" at the age of 11, coming home at all hours and later riding a motorbike. She moved to London at the age of 17. She studied at the LSE, gaining a BSc in economics and an MSc in monetary economics.

== Career ==
After university she had, according to Ned Temko, a "glittering career" as an economist and then chief economist at Williams & Glyn's Bank (now part of the Royal Bank of Scotland) from 1973 to 1983; as corporate economist for Exxon Europe from 1983 to 1986; and as chief economist at Peat Marwick McLintock and KPMG from 1986 to 2001. When having a child, she took six weeks off for each one.

She left KPMG at Blackfriars in late 2001, and worked for the London Economics consultancy. As of December 2021, she is on the advisory board of OMFIF where she is regularly involved in meetings regarding the financial and monetary system. In 2023, Pryce became a senior member of the British Chambers of Commerce's newly-launched Economic Advisory Council. The council was established to build on the organisation's Quarterly Economic Survey and "develop policies to get the economy and businesses growing".

Pryce is also patron of Pro Bono Economics and of the charity Working Chance. She is a trustee for Women in Prison and is a Freeman and Liveryman of the City of London.

=== Department of Trade and Industry ===
Pryce joined the Department for Trade and Industry in August 2002 as Chief Economic Adviser, the first woman to be appointed to the post, for which the salary was about £110,000. She was also Chairwoman of the GoodCorporation, an organisation promoting ethical business practices.

Pryce was Deputy Head of the UK Government Economic Service from 2004 to 2007, and Joint Head from 2007 to 2010. She was appointed a Companion of the Order of the Bath (CB) in the 2009 Birthday Honours but this was cancelled and annulled on 30 July 2013 following her release from prison.

In April 2010, it was announced that she would be leaving the Department for Business, Innovation and Skills where she was Director General, Economics, and Joint Head of the Government Economic Service, to become senior managing director at the finance consultancy firm FTI Consulting.

=== Academia ===
She was a visiting professor at City University's Cass Business School from 2002 to 2006 and from 2008 to 2011, and at Imperial College Business School since 2010; a visiting Fellow at Nuffield College, Oxford, since 2008; a Fellow of the Society of Business Economists since 2005; and the council of the Royal Society for the Arts from 2008 to 2009. She sat on the Council of the University of Kent and was a Member of the Council of the Royal Economic Society (REconS) from 2002 to 2007.

In 2010 she became the first female Master of the Worshipful Company of Management Consultants.

As of 2021, Pryce is a visiting professor at Birmingham City University and King's College London. She is also a Fellow and council member of the UK Academy for Social Sciences, a Fellow of the Society of Professional Economists, a companion of the British Academy of Management, an Honorary Senior Fellow at Regent's University and on the Regent's University Court, and a fellow of the RADIX centre for Business, Politics and Society.

== Books ==
=== How to be a Successful Economist ===
This title, released in late 2022, is a guide for students working towards successful careers in economics. The authors, Vicky Pryce, Andy Ross, Alvin Birdi and Ian Harwood, walk readers through the interview process for graduate positions and the attributes that employers are looking for. Video interviews are also available with the purchase of the book.

Dr Matthew Aldrich, Associate Professor in Economics at the University of East Anglia, described the book as "original" and said "there is no comparable text I know of and the pragmatic issues are covered extremely well". Jarkko Immonen, a careers counsellor at the University of Helsinki, called it a "comprehensive hands-on look at the world of work from an economist's point of view with an emphasis on opportunities and societal relevance". The book was published by Oxford University Press.

=== Women Vs Capitalism ===
Subtitled "why we can't have it all in a free market economy", Women Vs Capitalism is an urgent call to reform capitalism so that it "stops failing women".

The then-Chair of the Business, Energy and Industrial Strategy Committee, in the House of Commons, Rachel Reeves, wrote in The Observer that the 2019 book was "fantastic" and "shines a much-needed light on discrimination". In The Guardian, Polly Toynbee said it was a "long overdue dissection of the vital subject of gender equality through Vicky Pryce's forensic economic lens".

=== It's The Economy, Stupid ===
In 2015, Pryce co-authored It's The Economy, Stupid: Economics for Voters with Andy Ross and Peter Urwin, which was published by BiteBack Publishing. The book examines economic issues relevant to UK voters, including immigration, austerity, and the relationship between economic policy and elections.

=== Why Women Need Quotas ===
Published in 2015 as part of Biteback Publishing's Provocations series, edited by Yasmin Alibhai-Brown, Why Women Need Quotas was written with former management editor of the Financial Times, Stefan Stern.

The book argues that by failing to remove the 'barriers' to female progression, the UK is being "starved" of the talent it needs to grow and prosper to its full potential. It goes on to recommend that women be hired even if no one wants them.

=== Redesigning Manufacturing ===
Co-authored with Michael Beverland and Beverley Nielsen, this 2015 book suggests that UK manufacturing has an "image problem". It redresses the situation, which it suggests is more fiction than fact, by focusing on the real successes of the sector and the strategies used by makers to achieve sustainable results.

=== Prisonomics ===
Pryce published a book based on her experience at HM Prison East Sutton Park in October 2013. The book, Prisonomics: Behind Bars in Britain's Failing Prisons, makes claims about the economic and human costs of imprisoning women, with especial reference to herself. Previous convicts have done the same thing, notably Horatio Bottomley. Royalties were donated to the charity Working Chance to help former women prisoners find work.

=== Greekonomics ===
In October 2012, Biteback Publishing released Greekonomics, a discussion of the crises in the eurozone, with the focus on the country of her birth. Intended for a broad, not merely an academic, readership, the book discusses what Greek exit from the eurozone might mean.

It was shortlisted for Spear's best business book of the year award in 2013.

In early July 2013 Vicky Pryce appeared as an expert witness before the House of Lords cross-party subcommittee on economic and financial affairs, saying she saw no quick end to the eurozone crisis since structural reform would take a long time. Pryce favoured fiscal policy that included a stimulus package and wanted the European Central Bank to buy bonds.

== Conviction ==
Pryce was interviewed twice by Essex Police in 2011 over allegations that, in 2003, she had accepted driving licence penalty points actually incurred by her then husband, Chris Huhne (then an MEP). She falsely claimed that she was driving the car, and accepted the licence penalty points on his behalf so that he could avoid being banned from driving.

In 2012 it was announced that both would be charged with perverting the course of justice. Pryce entered a plea of not guilty, unsuccessfully advancing a defence of marital coercion at trial. In March 2013, she was convicted of perverting the course of justice and was sentenced to eight months in prison, the same as Huhne who had pleaded guilty. Pryce served her sentence at HM Prison Holloway.

Pryce and Huhne left prison on licence on 13 May 2013, subject to electronic tagging.

== Personal life ==
In 1972 she married Gareth Pryce, an LSE post-graduate student, whom she divorced in 1981, having had two daughters with him. In 1984, she married Chris Huhne, who later became an MEP and then the Liberal Democrat MP for Eastleigh and Secretary of State for Energy and Climate Change. They had three children. They divorced in January 2011. She is now involved with former MP Denis MacShane, who had also served time in prison, in his case for having made false expenses claims.

Government offices
Preceded by Sir Nicholas Stern	Head of the Government Economic Service with Dave Ramsden; 2007-2010	Succeeded by Dave Ramsden
