= Julie Harvey =

Julie Harvey may refer to:

- Julie Harvey (footballer), New Zealand footballer
- Julie Harvey (artist) (born 1963), American contemporary art painter, multimedia producer, video director and choreographer
