= Peter Whiting =

Peter Whiting may refer to:

- Peter Whiting (footballer), New Zealand football goalkeeper
- Peter Whiting (rugby union) (born 1946), New Zealand rugby union player
