= Charlie Bean =

Charlie Bean may refer to:

- Charlie Bean (economist) (born 1953), British economist
- Charlie Bean (filmmaker) (born 1970), American animator and film director

== See also ==
- Charles Bean (1879–1968), Australian World War I war correspondent and historian
