= Office for Budget Responsibility =

British public body advising the Treasury

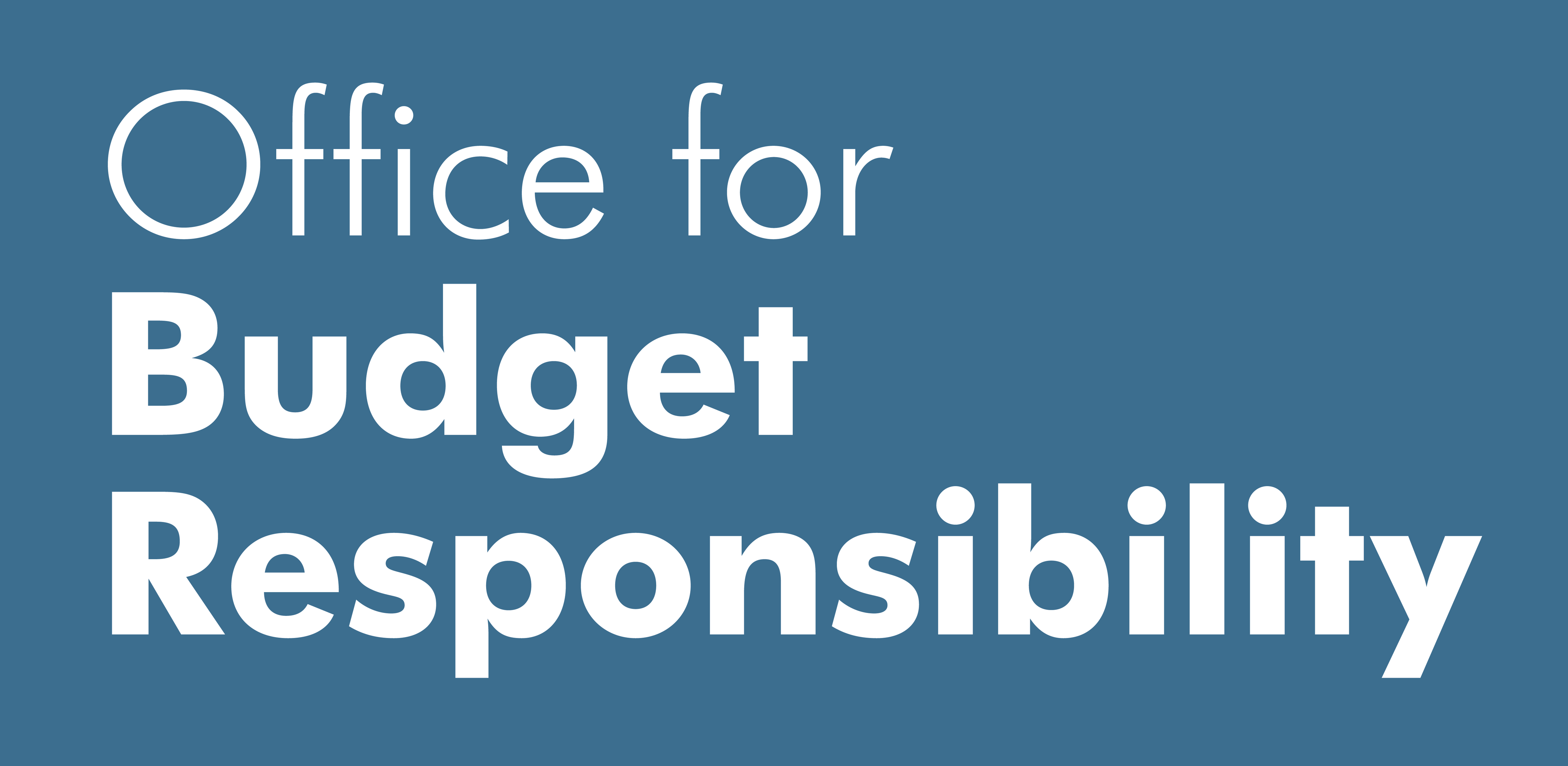
- Abbreviation: OBR
- Formation: May 2010
- Type: Non-departmental public body
- Purpose: To provide independent and authoritative analysis of the UK’s public finances
- Region served: United Kingdom
- Chair: Vacant
- Staff: 54 (2024/25)
- Website: obr.uk

The Office for Budget Responsibility (OBR) is a non-departmental public body funded by the UK Treasury that provides independent economic forecasts and independent analysis of the public finances.

It was formally created in May 2010 following the general election by the Cameron-Clegg coalition government and was placed on a statutory footing in 2011. It is one of a growing number of official independent fiscal watchdogs around the world.

== Functions ==
The OBR examines and reports on the sustainability of the public finances and provides analysis and forecasts on the economy at the time of the UK Government's Budget and Spring Statements.

The functions and responsibilities of the OBR are contained within the 2011 Act. It has four main duties:

=== Forecasts of the economy and public finances ===
The OBR produces five-year forecasts for the economy and public finances twice a year. The forecasts accompany the Chancellor's Budget Statement and Spring Statement and they incorporate the impact of any tax and spending measures announced by the Chancellor. Details of the forecasts are set out in the Economic and fiscal outlook (EFO) publications. The annual Forecast evaluation report (FER) published each autumn, examines how the EFO forecasts compare to subsequent outturns. The OBR has published material describing its approach to forecasting the economy and public finances, and the macroeconomic model it uses.

=== Evaluation of the Government’s performance against its fiscal targets ===
The OBR uses its public finance forecasts to assess the Government's performance against its fiscal targets. The Government has set itself two medium-term fiscal targets: first, a fiscal mandate for the cyclically-adjusted current budget to be in surplus by 2029-30, and second, a supplementary target to have public sector net debt, defined as public sector net financial liabilities, falling as a share of GDP in 2029-30. These are both until 2029-30 becomes the third year of the forecast, as which point the target becomes a rolling target to be assessed in the third year of the forecast. In the Economic and fiscal outlook, the OBR assesses whether the Government has a greater than 50 per cent probability of hitting these targets under current policy. Given the uncertainty inherent in all fiscal forecasts, the OBR also tests how robust this judgement is by using historical evidence, sensitivity analysis and alternative scenarios.

=== Scrutiny of the Government’s policy costings ===
The OBR conducts scrutiny and analysis of HM Treasury’s costing of tax and welfare spending measures. During the run-up to the Budget and the Spring Statement, the OBR subjects the Government's draft costings of tax and spending measures to detailed challenge and scrutiny. These are then stated in the EFO and the Treasury's policy costing documents with the OBR stating whether it endorses the costings that the Government finally publishes as reasonable central estimates. The OBR also assigns each certified costing with an uncertainty rating based on data quality, modelling and behavioural response. In March 2014, the OBR has published a briefing paper describing its role in policy costings and how they fit into the forecast process.

==== The OBR and the September 2022 mini-budget ====
In 2022, the OBR was notably not asked for a fiscal forecast by the short-lived Truss ministry prior to announcement of its ultimately controversial mini-budget by the then Chancellor of the Exchequer Kwasi Kwarteng which contained a large amount of tax cuts. The mini-budget ultimately had negative effect on the British economy dramatically decreasing the market value of the pound and forcing the Truss-led government to do a u-turn on most of the announcements made in the mini-budget with Kwarteng sacked and replaced by Jeremy Hunt as Chancellor. The decision of the Truss ministry to ignore the OBR and pursue large tax cuts was and remains widely derided by the political establishment and some figures in the British media. The mini-budget ultimately triggered the start of a government crisis which saw Truss forced to resign and replaced by Rishi Sunak as Prime Minister after just 49 days in office.

=== Assess the long-term sustainability of the public finances ===
The OBR also assesses the long-term sustainability of the public finances. Its annual Fiscal sustainability report sets out long-term projections for different categories of spending, revenue and financial transactions and assesses whether they imply a sustainable path for public sector debt. The Fiscal sustainability report also analyses the health of the public sector's balance sheet using both conventional National Accounts measures and the Whole of Government Accounts as prepared using commercial accounting principles.

In October 2015 the UK Parliament approved a revised Charter for Budget Responsibility that required the OBR to produce a fiscal risks report at least once every two years and the Government to respond to it formally within a year of publication. In July 2017, OBR published a review of risks from the economy and financial system, to tax revenues, public spending and the balance sheet, and included a fiscal stress test.

=== Additional functions ===
==== Devolved tax and spending forecasts ====
In addition to these core responsibilities, the Government asked the OBR to forecast the Scottish receipts for four taxes that were devolved to the Scottish Government from April 2015 onwards; the Scottish rate of income tax, stamp duty land tax, landfill tax and the aggregates levy. Following the passing of the Scotland Act 2016, the OBR also forecast Scottish air passenger duty and aspects of Scottish social security that will be devolved. The OBR has published these forecasts since March 2012 alongside UK revenue forecasts. The OBR has a reciprocal statutory duty of cooperation with the Scottish Fiscal Commission in the production of forecasts of devolved Scottish taxes and welfare expenditure. In a Command Paper published with the Wales Bill 2014, the Government requested that the OBR produced forecasts for Welsh devolved taxes. Since December 2014, the OBR has been forecasting the Welsh rate of income tax, stamp-duty land tax, landfill tax and aggregates levy. From April 2019 the OBR is providing the Welsh Government with independent scrutiny of its forecasts.

==== Welfare spending analysis ====
In March 2014, the Charter for Budget Responsibility was modified to include a new cap on welfare expenditure alongside the Government's fiscal mandate. The March 2014 welfare cap puts a limit on the amount that the government could spend on certain social security benefits in the years 2015-16 to 2018-19. The welfare cap was adjusted in December 2015 and restructured in January 2017. The current cap is set against the OBR's November 2017 forecast for welfare cap spending in 2022-23 with adjustments made by HM Treasury in March and October 2018. The cap is preceded by a "pathway" with a growing margin of error to 3 per cent in the target year. The OBR is charged with formally assessing spending against the welfare cap and margin at the first Budget or fiscal update of each new Parliament and monitoring spending against the pathway and margin at each Budget and fiscal update before the formal assessment of the cap.

As part of this function, the OBR is required to produce a forecast for welfare spending in scope of the cap in its Economic and fiscal outlook. The welfare cap means that if spending exceeds a certain limit, then policy action must be taken, or the cap level must change, and Parliamentary approval must be obtained. The OBR is required to assess whether welfare spending above the cap is caused by movements in the forecast or by discretionary policy changes. The OBR is also tasked with producing an annual report on trends in welfare spending.

==== Briefing material ====
The OBR undertakes a variety of research projects through the year. It publishes briefing material to inform the public about its work, and provides a same-day briefing on the public finances statistics. The Budget Responsibility Committee members and OBR staff also give talks and presentations at external events. Robert Chote has discussed the role of the OBR, and the difference that it made after its first three years in existence, in a lecture entitled Britain's fiscal watchdog: a view from the kennel on 9 May 2013. Its activities are summarised each year in its Annual Reports.

== History ==
=== Establishment ===
The Conservative Party had previously set-up a shadow OBR organisation in opposition in December 2009. Upon entering office following the 2010 general election, Chancellor George Osborne announced the formation of the body in his first official speech. He criticised the economic and fiscal forecasts of the previous Labour government, and announced that the OBR would be responsible for publishing these independently of government in future. The objective underpinning its creation was to provide an independent assessment of national public finances before the coalition Government's emergency budget in June 2010, which outlined the size and pace of the fiscal consolidation plan inherited from the outgoing administration. The role of the Office is to advise whether the declared policy of the Government is likely to meet its targets

The OBR was initially chaired by Sir Alan Budd who, along with Geoffrey Dicks and Graham Parker, formed the Budget Responsibility Committee. Budd had been a founding member of the MPC; Dicks was chief economist at Novus Capital and former chief economist of the Royal Bank of Scotland; and Parker headed up the Treasury’s public sector finances team. The remainder of the initial team comprised eight staff seconded from the Treasury. The initial team provided recommendations to the Chancellor on the role of the permanent OBR.

The OBR produced its first forecast for public finances shortly before the June 2010 budget with the second at the June budget incorporating the impact of newly announced measures. Colin Talbot, Chair of Public Policy and Management at Manchester Business School and Treasury adviser on public spending, questioned the credibility of the new organisation. He said that the body could not be set up in time to judge the forecasts in the June 2010 United Kingdom budget. In his opinion, the OBR would not be sufficiently independent of politicians or the Executive to remove the politics from economic decision-making. The office made adjustments to its forecasts in the week before the June 2010 budget. These were thought to be politically favourable to the coalition government and so cast doubt on its independence.

In July 2010 it was announced that Budd would not continue in the role after his initial 3-month contract expired. The Financial Times reported "His departure was expected and Sir Alan had let it be known privately that he had never intended to serve as chairman of the OBR for anything other than a short period. His contract spanned the emergency Budget, leaving enough time thereafter to advise on the legislation needed to establish the OBR on a permanent basis." Speculation on his successor had included Rachel Lomax, John Gieve, Andrew Dilnot, Robert Chote, Michael Scholar and Ruth Lea.

In September 2010, Chancellor George Osborne announced that Robert Chote had been appointed as the new Chairman of the Budget Responsibility Committee (BRC). The two other members of the BRC were Prof. Sir Stephen Nickell, a former member of the Bank of England Monetary Policy Committee and Graham Parker, who formerly headed up the Treasury's public sector finances team. Oversight Board was also created comprising the three BRC members plus two external members Kate Barker and Lord Terry Burns acting as non-Executive Directors.

The OBR was placed on a statutory footing by the Budget Responsibility and National Audit Act 2011.

=== Reviews of the OBR ===
The OBR has been reviewed a number of times since it was established in 2010:

- Kevin Page, former Parliamentary Budget Officer for Canada, reviewed the OBR in its first External review in April 2014. The Review concludes that the OBR has “laudably achieved the core duties of its mandate” and “has succeeded in reducing perceptions of bias in fiscal and economic forecasting”.
- In June 2015, the Chancellor to the Exchequer asked Sir Dave Ramsden, Chief Economic Adviser to HM Treasury at the time, to carry out a review of the OBR. The review, published in September 2015, reflected the findings in the External review led by Kevin Page in summer 2014 and made a number of recommendations that would strengthen its existing work and provide deeper and broader scrutiny of its management of the public finances.
- According to the International Monetary Fund’s Fiscal Transparency Evaluation for the UK, the depth and breadth of the economic and fiscal analysis published by the OBR “can be considered as best-practice, and could be used as a benchmark by other advanced countries”. “While it is still relatively early in its track record, the OBR’s forecasting record indicates a lower degree of bias than under the Treasury forecasting regime.”
- European Fiscal Board of the European Commission argued in its 2018 Annual Report that the OBR has retained “a high degree of public trust in its ability to provide objective assessments of the macroeconomic outlook and public finances”.

=== Executive leadership and non-executive board changes ===
Chote, Nickell and Parker were reappointed for their second terms in September 2015, November 2013 and October 2014 respectively.

In January 2017, Prof. Sir Charles Bean, former Deputy Governor for Monetary Policy at the Bank of England, replaced Nickell as the economy expert on the BRC. And in September 2018, former OBR Chief of Staff Andy King replaced Parker as the fiscal expert on the committee. In January 2022, David Miles, former external member of the Bank of England Monetary Policy Committee and Chief UK Economist at Morgan Stanley, replaced Bean as the economy expert on the BRC.

Sir Christopher Kelly replaced Kate Barker as non-executive member of the OBR and Oversight Board chair in June 2017. The following year in June 2018, Bronwyn Curtis joined as a non-executive member and Audit sub-Committee chair, replacing Lord Terry Burns.

In October 2020, Robert Chote was succeeded by Richard Hughes. Hughes resigned in December 2025 over the OBR's leaking of the 2025 budget.

== Controversies ==
=== November 2025 budget leak ===
On 26 November 2025, the OBR accidentally released its 2025 budget report prior to the budget speech. An internal investigation into the leak, led by the OBR’s Chief of Staff Laura Gardiner, was published on 1 December 2025. It described the leak as, "the worst failure in the 15 year history of the OBR," and that "ultimate responsibility" for the leak lay with "the leadership of the OBR." As a result Richard Hughes immediately resigned as OBR Chair.

In the days between the leak and Hughes' resignation, Hughes had accused the Chancellor of the Exchequer Rachel Reeves of overstating the size of the "fiscal shortfall" or "black hole" which her budget sought to address.

The leak came a matter of days after a report published by the centre-right think tank the Centre for Policy Studies showed that "out of 54 medium-term [OBR] forecasts from 1990 to 2019, actual managed expenditure was always above what was forecast."

== Organisational structure ==
=== Budget Responsibility Committee ===
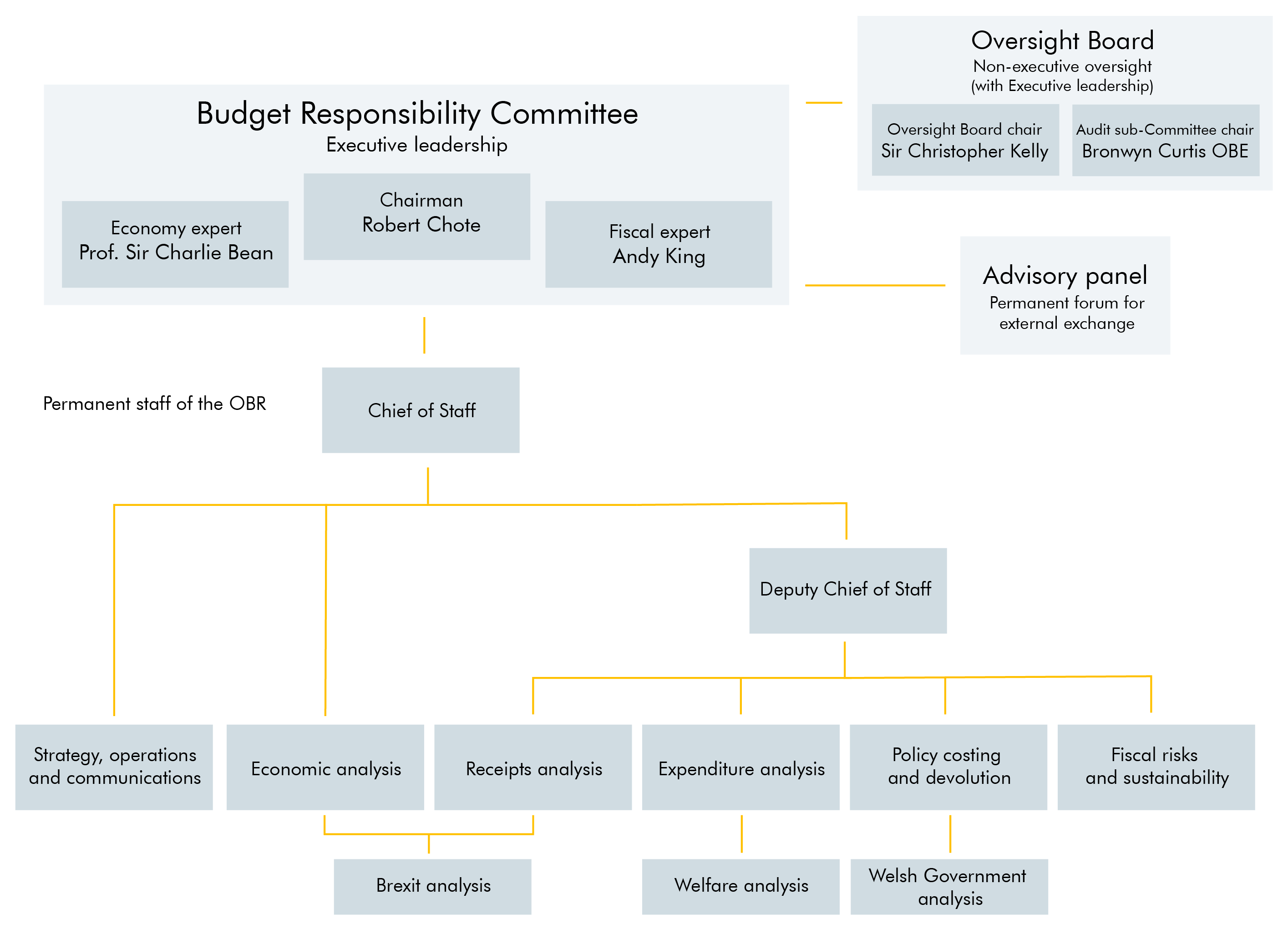

The three members of the Budget Responsibility Committee (BRC) who are appointed by the Chancellor of the Exchequer following an appointment hearing at the Treasury Select Committee, lead the OBR. They have executive responsibility for carrying out the core functions of the OBR, including responsibility for the judgements reached in its forecasts. They are:

- Prof. Jonathan Haskel
- Prof. David Miles
- Tom Josephs

==== List of previous chairmen ====
1. Sir Alan Budd (2010)
2. Sir Robert Chote (2010–2020)
3. Richard Hughes (2020-2025)

=== Oversight Board ===
The OBR's Oversight Board ensures that effective arrangements are in place to provide assurance on risk management, governance and internal control. It consists of the three members of the BRC plus two non-executive members, Dame Susan Rice and Baroness Sarah Hogg.

=== Advisory Panel ===
The OBR's Advisory Panel of economic and fiscal experts meets regularly to advise the OBR on its work programme and analytical methods. Currently members come from the Bank of England, the Institute for Fiscal Studies, academia, and other bodies.

=== Permanent staff of the OBR ===
The BRC are supported in their work by the OBR’s permanent staff of 52 civil servants, led by Laura Gardiner. The staff work in teams covering:

- Strategy, operations and communications
- Economic analysis
- Receipts analysis
- Expenditure analysis
- Policy costing and devolution
- Fiscal risks and sustainability

== Legislation and related material ==
The OBR's formal rights and responsibilities are outlined in five documents:

- The Budget Responsibility and National Audit Act 2011
- The Charter for Budget Responsibility
- The OBR/HM Treasury Framework document
- A Memorandum of Understanding between the OBR and government departments with which it interacts most frequently and closely: HM Treasury, HM Revenue and Customs and the Department for Work and Pensions.
- The Budget Responsibility Act 2024

=== Primary legislation ===
The Budget Responsibility and National Audit Act sets out the overarching duty of the OBR to examine and report on the sustainability of the public finances. It also gives complete discretion to the OBR in the performance of its duties, as long as those duties are performed objectively, transparently and independently and takes into account the sitting government's policies and not alternative policies.

=== The Charter for Budget Responsibility ===
The Charter outlines the OBR's independence which includes complete discretion to decide:

- The methodology underpinning the OBR's forecasts, assessment and analyses;
- The judgements made by the OBR in producing these outputs;
- The content of the OBR's publications; and
- The OBR's work programme of research and additional analysis.

The Charter also specifies material that the OBR have to include in its forecasts and gives the Chancellor the right to determine the length of the forecast horizon – subject to a minimum of five years. The Charter states that the Government remains responsible for policy decisions and costings and the OBR “should not provide normative commentary on the particular merits of Government policies”. It also gives the OBR right of access to all Government information which it may reasonably require for the performance of its duties. Under the Memorandum of Understanding where it is not possible to reach agreement, issues may be escalated to the Chair of the OBR and the Permanent Secretaries as appropriate.

As a non-departmental public body under the aegis of the Treasury, the OBR is formally accountable to the Treasury Select Committee of the House of Commons. This accountability to parliament takes a number of elements:

1. First the four core publications the OBR is required to publish each year have to be laid formally before parliament;
2. Second, the Treasury Select Committee can call on the OBR to give evidence on its work at any time;
3. Third, the Treasury Select Committee has a role in determining the membership of the Budget Responsibility Committee. When a new member has to be appointed, the Chancellor of the Exchequer names his preferred candidate following a formal application and interview process run by the civil service. The Treasury Select Committee holds confirmation hearings with the candidate and can veto the Chancellor's choice.

=== Framework document ===
The OBR’s governance and management arrangements are set out in greater detail in a Framework document drawn up by the Treasury and agreed with the OBR. This describes the purposes of the OBR, how it is accountable to Parliament and the Chancellor, its governance and structure, the responsibilities of the accounting officer, the content of the annual report, the audit arrangements, and its managements and budgeting processes.

=== Memorandum of Understanding ===
The Memorandum of Understanding sets out the agreed working relationship between the OBR, HM Revenue and Customs, the Department for Work and Pensions, and HM Treasury. It sets out the arrangements needed for effective working, covering each institution’s key responsibilities, coordination of the forecast process, and the process for information sharing.

=== Devolved administrations ===
==== Scotland ====
Alongside the Scotland Bill 2012, which set out plans to devolve taxes to the Scottish Parliament, the Government produced a Command Paper which asked the OBR to produce forecasts for Scottish income tax, stamp-duty land tax, landfill tax and aggregates levy. Since then the OBR have been publishing Scottish tax forecasts alongside each Economic and fiscal outlook. In April 2015, the Government fully devolved stamp duty and landfill tax to Scotland. Following the passing of the Scotland Act 2016 the OBR now also forecast Scottish air passenger duty and aspects of Scottish social security that will be devolved.

The Scottish Parliament’s Scottish Fiscal Commission Act 2016 established the Scottish Fiscal Commission (SFC) which has a statutory remit to prepare independent forecasts for the Scottish economy, the Scottish Government’s tax revenues and devolved social security spending. In January 2019 the SFC and OBR signed a Memorandum of Understanding to formalise how the two organisations work together.

==== Wales ====
In a Command Paper published with the Wales Bill 2014, the Government requested that the OBR produce Welsh forecasts alongside each Economic and fiscal outlook. Since December 2014 the OBR have been forecasting the Welsh rate of income tax, stamp-duty land tax, landfill tax and aggregates levy.

From April 2019 the OBR is providing the Welsh Government with independent scrutiny of its forecasts.

The OBR works with the Welsh Government to ensure that it can bring all relevant information to bear in producing their Welsh tax forecasts and have agreed a Memorandum of Understanding.

==== Northern Ireland ====
An agreement is in place to devolve corporation tax to Northern Ireland though the exact timing remains uncertain.

== International engagement ==
The OBR was a member of the EU Independent Fiscal Institutions Network set up by the EU in September 2015 before withdrawing after Brexit.

It also takes part in the OECD network of Parliamentary Budget Offices and Independent Fiscal Institutions.

== See also ==
- Fiscal council
- Federal Planning Bureau (Belgium)
- Parliamentary Budget Officer (Canada)
- National Assembly Budget Office (Korea)
- Congressional Budget Office (United States)
- CPB Netherlands Bureau for Economic Policy Analysis (Netherlands)
- Parliamentary Budget Office (Australia)
- High Council of Public Finances (France)
- Irish Fiscal Advisory Council (Ireland)
- Independent Authority for Fiscal Responsibility (Spain)
- Independent Advisory Board of the Stability Council (Germany)
- Swedish Fiscal Policy Council (Sweden)
- Scottish Fiscal Commission (Scotland)
