= David Walton (economist) =

British economist (1963–2006)

David Robert Walton (30 May 1963 – 21 June 2006) was a British economist, and a member of the Bank of England's Monetary Policy Committee from July 2005 until his death in June 2006.

Walton gained a BA in economics and politics with first class honours at Van Mildert College, Durham University in 1984. After graduating Walton took a position at HM Treasury working as an economist. He held this position until 1986 when he left to pursue an MA in economics at University of Warwick, in which he gained a distinction. He joined the economics team at Goldman Sachs in 1987. In 2003 he was appointed as their chief European economist and as the chairman of the Society of Business Economists. In 2005 became a visiting research professor at the University of Oxford's economics department, and joined the Bank of England's Monetary Policy Committee.

David Walton died on 21 June 2006 after contracting necrotising fasciitis, possibly occurring from the urinary tract. In his final meeting, Walton was the only member preferring an increase in the interest rate, the other seven members voting to maintain the rate at 4.5%. Walton had also been the only member supporting such an increase in the previous month's meeting.
