= Government Economic Service =

Civil Service Profession overview
- Formed: 1964
- Civil Service Profession executive: Professor Brian Bell, Head of the Government Economic Service
- Website: ges.gov.uk

The Government Economic Service (GES) is a professional grouping of public sector economists who work across some 40 departments and agencies of His Majesty's Government (HMG). The GES Board is chaired by the Head of the GES and consists of government chief economists and directors of analysis. GES was founded in 1964 by Sir Alec Cairncross. The GES recruits economists on behalf of the departments and is the largest recruiter of economists in the UK.

Professional support for the GES, and since 2010 also for the Government Social Research profession, is provided by the Government Economic and Social Research Team, located at HM Treasury.

== History ==
The current Joint Heads are Professor Brian Bell and Alison Kilburn. Professor Brian Bell began his role on 9 March 2026 and Alison Kilburn was appointed in June 2026.

From March 2018 the post of the Head of the GES had been held jointly by Sam Beckett and Clare Lombardelli. From June 2007 to July 2010, it held jointly by the managing director of Macroeconomic and Fiscal Policy in HM Treasury and Chief Economic Adviser to the Treasury Dave Ramsden CBE and Vicky Pryce Director General of Economics in the BIS. Tera Allas replaced Vicky Pryce at BIS in December 2010 and was Deputy Head of the GES until June 2013 during which time Dave Ramsden was the sole Head of the GES. Before this, the previous Head of the GES was Sir Nicholas Stern, now Lord Stern of Brentford, who succeeded Lord O'Donnell.
