= Barry Pickering =

New Zealand footballer

Barry Pickering MNZM
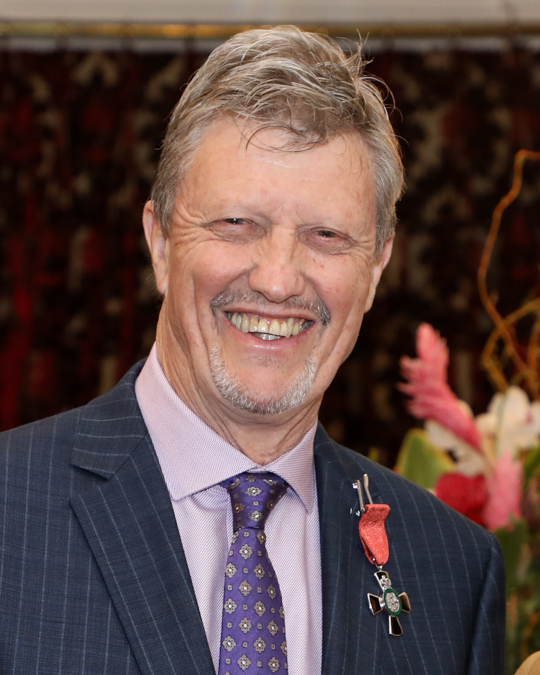
- Pickering in 2023

Personal information
- Full name: Barry Thomas Pickering
- Date of birth: 12 December 1956 (age 69)
- Place of birth: Christchurch, New Zealand
- Height: 1.78 m (5 ft 10 in)
- Position: Goalkeeper

Senior career*
Years	Team	Apps	(Gls)
1978	Stop Out		
1981	Christchurch United		
1982–1986	Miramar Rangers		

International career
1978–1984	New Zealand	11	(0)
- * Club domestic league appearances and goals

Barry Thomas Pickering MNZM (born 12 December 1956) is a retired association football player who was successful in representing New Zealand internationally, being part of the 1982 squad that participated at 1982 FIFA World Cup finals where he was the third choice goalkeeper behind Frank van Hattum and Richard Wilson.

Pickering made his full All Whites international debut in a 2-0 win over Singapore on 1 October 1978, and was a member of the squad that qualified for the 1982 FIFA World Cup finals in Spain but did not make the field in Spain. Including friendlies and unofficial games against club sides, Pickering played 20 times for New Zealand, ending his international playing career with 11 official A-international caps to his credit, keeping a clean sheet in his final appearance, a 2-0 win over Malaysia on 31 March 1984.

In the 2023 King's Birthday and Coronation Honours, Pickering was appointed a Member of the New Zealand Order of Merit, for services to football.
