= Richard O'Brien (economist) =

British economist, author and consultant (born 1950)

- Born: Richard Rhys O'Brien; November 19, 1950 (age 76); Banbury, Oxfordshire, England
- Education: University of Oxford
- Occupations: Economist, futurist, author and consultant
- Known for: Co-founder of Outsights planning consultancy

Richard Rhys O'Brien (born 19 November 1950, Banbury, Oxfordshire) is a British economist, futurist, author and co-founder of Outsights, a scenario planning consultancy. Since 2009, he has also been a singer songwriter and biographer.

== Early life ==
After graduating from Oxford University (MA Hons. Philosophy, Politics and Economics) and Edinburgh University (Diploma in African Studies), O'Brien worked at Rothschild Intercontinental Bank and American Express Bank for 21 years. At American Express, he was Chief Economist and Executive Director and Editor of The Amex Bank Review where he did country risk analysis. O'Brien created the economics essay competition called "The Amex Bank Review Awards", in memory of EU architect Robert Marjolin. He worked with the Group of Thirty (G30) on regulation and the World Bank. O'Brien worked on several books on the global economy, including Global Financial Integration: The End of Geography (1992).

== Later career in future planning ==
In 1998, O'Brien set up the scenario planning consultancy Outsights, with Tim Bolderson, who had worked with him at Global Business Network, where they completed large-scale scenario planning projects such as The Future of Japan. O'Brien has led and developed scenarios for business and the UK Government in a wide range of sectors, including "The Future of the International Environment 2010–2020" and directing the Sigma Scan, an online database of future trends to 2050.

== Music career ==
Since 2009, O'Brien has published six albums of songs, under his full name Richard Rhys O'Brien.

== Biographer career ==
In 2019, he published an online study of the network of Lady Margaret Rhondda, the suffragette, businesswoman and publisher. In October 2022, under his full name, Richard Rhys O'Brien, his first biographical study of the political and other campaigns of Margaret Lloyd George, the wife of the Prime Minister David Lloyd George 1918-1922, was published by Y Lolfa, followed in 2025 by the prequel, The Woman Who Helped Win the War, The Welfare Campaigns of Margaret Lloyd George 1914-1918 [Y Lolfa].

== Publications and songs ==
- I know a little place, music album 2012
- Anguneau sunset, music album 2014
- Sense in our brains, music album 2015
- Don't Believe the Crystal Ball, music album 2018
- The Ballad of Highbury Barn, music album 2019
- Wherever the Moon Is, Songs of Migration, music album 2019
- The Campaigns of Margaret Lloyd George. The Wife of the Prime Minister 1916–1922, Y Lolfa, ISBN 978-1-80099-231-3
- The Woman Who Helped Win the War. The Welfare Campaigns of Margaret Lloyd George, 1914-1918 (Y Lolfa) ISBN 978-1-80099-640-3
- "Drivers of change for the future of the UN", in Stephen Browne and Thomas G. Weiss (eds), Post 2015-UN Development: Making change happen? (2014), Routledge, ISBN 978-0-415-85662-1
- The Annual Register 300th Edition: a personal future, ProQuest, the 2009 Annual Register: World Events, 9–15, 2009. ISBN 978-1-60030-828-4
- "The Geography of Finance: After the Storm" (with Alasdair Keith), Oxford University Press, Cambridge Journal of Regions, Economy and Society, Volume 2, Issue 2, July 2009. ISSN 1752-1386
- The Future of the Global Economy (with Alasdair Keith and Michael Prest), Outsights Ltd, 2009
- Corporate Governance, Financial Markets and Global Convergence (editor, with Morten Balling and Elizabeth Hennessy), Springer (1997). ISBN 978-0-7923-4825-2
- Risk Management in Volatile Financial Markets (with Fraco Bruni and Donald E. Fair), Allen, Springer (1996). ISBN 978-0-7923-4053-9
- Finance and the International Economy 8. The Amex Bank Review Prize Essays (editor), Oxford University Press, 1994. ISBN 0-19-828962-6
- Global Financial Integration: The End of Geography, Council on Foreign Relations Press (1992). ISBN 978-0-87609-123-4
- "Banking Perspectives on the Debt Crisis", Oxford Review of Economic Policy, 2: 25–38, 1986
- Private Bank Lending to Developing Countries: Past, Present and Future, World Bank Staff Working Paper No. 482, World Bank, Washington, DC, 1981

== Associations ==
O'Brien serves and has served on a number of governing councils, and has chaired several international competitions:

- BBC World Challenge
- Shell/Economist Writing Prize
- The Annual Register
- Royal Institute of International Affairs
- Society of Business Economists
- Royal Economic Society
- Research Advisory Board, Economic and Social Science Research Council
- Kingswood School, Bath
- Chair and Trustee, Highbury Opera Theatre
