= George Buckley (economist) =

British economist

George Buckley FAcSS
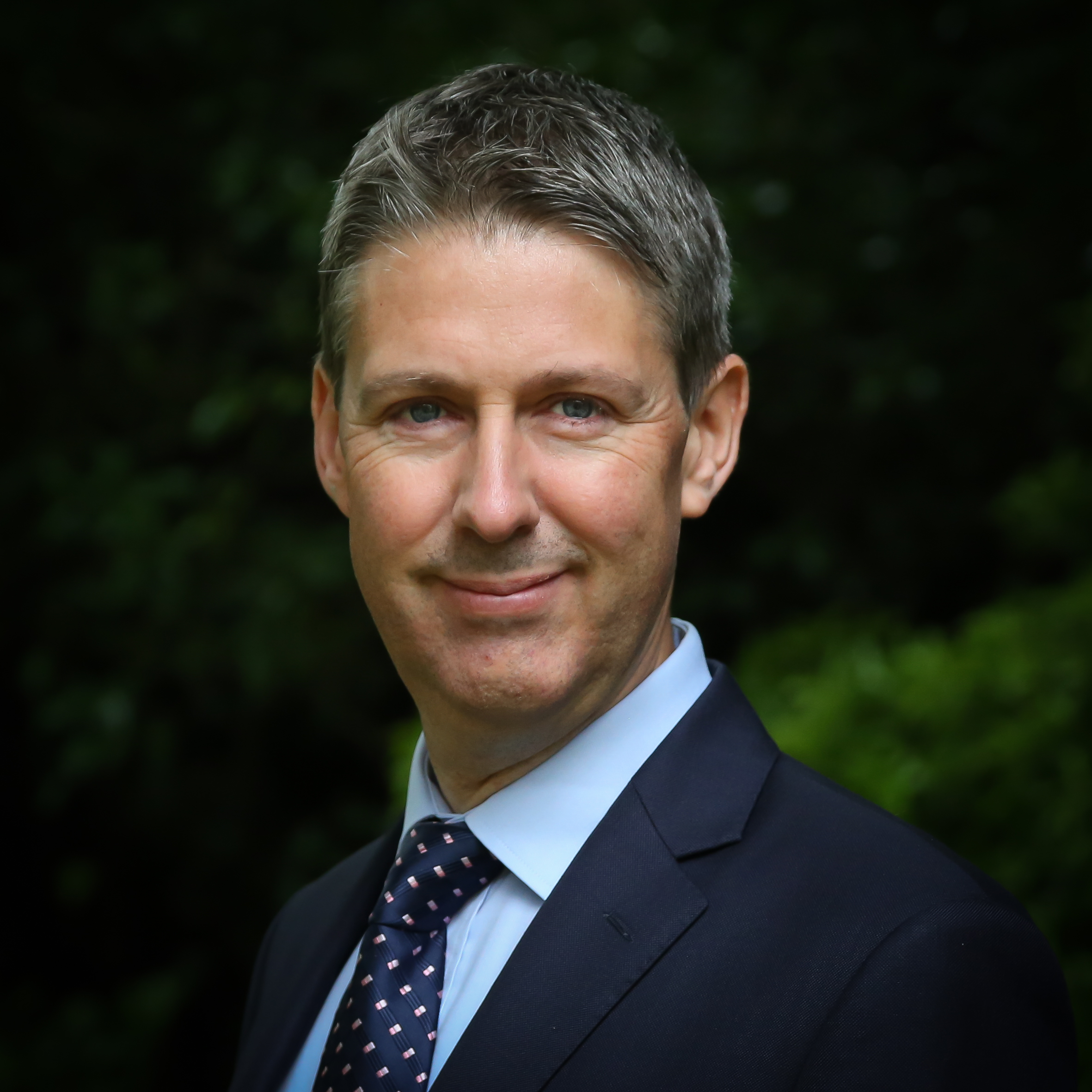
- George Buckley in 2020

Chair, Society of Professional Economists
- In office 2021–Incumbent
- Preceded by: Kevin Daly

Personal details
- Born: Lytham, Lancashire, England
- Occupation: Economist
- Known for: Macroeconomic analysis; monetary policy commentary
- Awards: Member, Royal Economic Society; Licentiate of the Royal Photographic Society (2017); Member, Royal Photographic Society (2021); Fellow, Academy of Social Sciences (2024)

Academic background
- Education: Bangor University; University of Bristol

Academic work
- Discipline: Economics
- Sub-discipline: Macroeconomics; Monetary economics

George Buckley FAcSS is a British economist, currently serving as Chair of the Society of Professional Economists (SPE). He is also Chief European Economist and Executive Director at Nomura. Buckley's work primarily focuses on macroeconomics, political analysis, and financial markets.

== Early life and education ==
Buckley was born in Lytham, Lancashire. He earned a BA in Economics from Bangor University, followed by an MSc in Economics and Finance and a PhD in Economics from the University of Bristol.

== Career ==
Buckley began his professional career at Deutsche Bank in London in October 1998. He served as the Chief UK Economist and Director until October 2016. In this role, he was responsible for UK macroeconomic coverage and forecasting key macroeconomic and financial data.

In January 2017, Buckley joined Nomura Holdings as the Chief European Economist and Executive Director. He leads the firm's research product out of the London office, covering the Eurozone, UK, Scandinavia, and Switzerland.

Buckley is the Chair of the Society of Professional Economists (SPE) since 2021, succeeding Kevin Daly. He previously served as Vice Chair and Chair of the Society's Membership Committee.

== Honours and awards ==
- Member of the Royal Economic Society
- 2011 - Rybczynski Essay Prize, Society of Professional Economists
- 2017 - Licentiate of the Royal Photographic Society (LRPS)
- 2021 - Member of the Royal Photographic Society
- 2024 - Elected Fellow of the Academy of Social Sciences (FAcSS)
