= Bronwyn Curtis =

British Australian Economist

Bronwyn N. Curtis
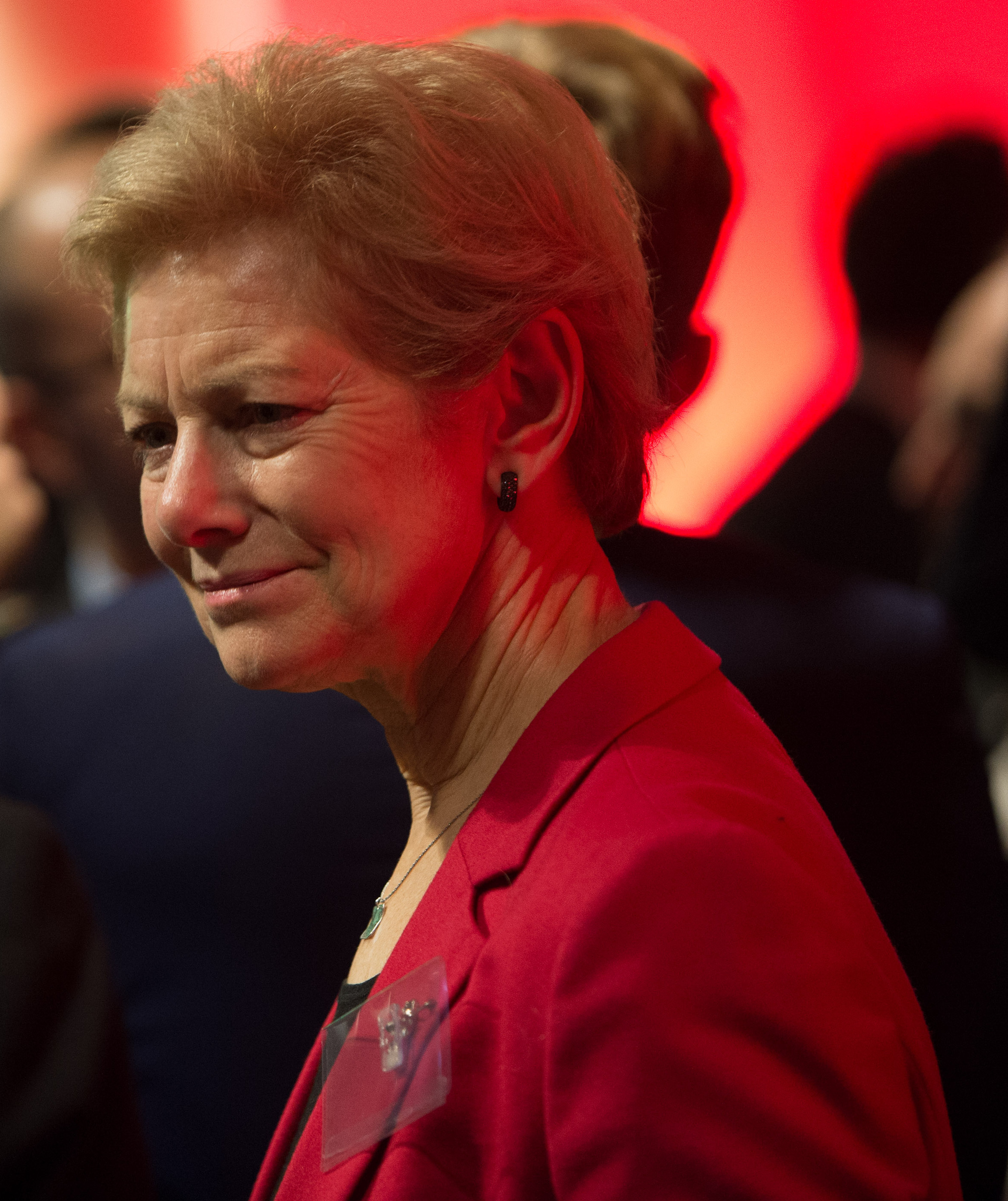
- Born: Bendigo, Victoria Australia
- Education: La Trobe University (BA) & London School of Economics (Msc)
- Occupation: Economist Author Speaker Advisory Board Member
- Awards: Order of the British Empire (OBE) Award (2008)
- Honours: Honorary Doctorate - La Trobe University (2017)

Bronwyn Nanette Curtis OBE is a British Australian Economist. Curtis has had a career as a global financial economist through her work at a number of financial firms including Deutsche Bank, HSBC, Nomura International (as Chief Economist), and Bloomberg LP. Curtis has served since 2018 for the Office for Budget Responsibility. Curtis also formerly served as the Governor for the London School of Economics (LSE).

== Biography ==
Born as Bronwyn Nannette Schlotterlein in Bendigo, Victoria in Australia, studied ballet at the Australian Ballet School after getting her high school diploma. She received her undergraduate degree in economics with Honours at La Trobe University in 1969, and a Masters in Economics from the London School of Economics in 1974. Curtis later married (is currently widowed) and has two children. Her hobbies include yacht racing and ballet.

In 2008, she received the Order of the British Empire award for outstanding service to business economics and in 2017 received an honorary doctorate from her alma mater (La Trobe University).

== Career ==
After receiving her master's degree from LSE, Curtis worked as a consultant for the World Bank and the United Nations Conference on Trade and Development (UNCTAD). She focused on projects situated in West Africa, Asia and the Caribbean. In her early career, she also held senior positions with Commodities Research Unit, Masterfoods and Gill & Duffus.

In 1987, Curtis assumed a position with Deutsche Bank Group, rising to the role of Global Head of Currency & Fixed Income Strategy by 1995. She subsequently transitioned to Nomura International in 1996, serving as the Chief Economist. In 1999, she shifted her career to media, becoming the Head of European Broadcast and Managing Editor for Bloomberg LP. Returning to the financial sector in 2008, she joined HSBC Bank, initially as the Head of Global Research, later advancing to Senior Advisor for Global Banking and Markets, and also assuming the role of Executive Editor for Global Communications.

Curtis served as an audit subcommittee chair for the UK Office of Budget Responsibility, appointed in 2018 and re-appointed for June 2021 for three years. Through this position, Curtis oversees the regulation and independence of the OBR.

== Awards ==
- Appointed Order of the British Empire in 2008 for outstanding services to business economics
- Doctor of Letters in 2017 from La Trobe University
- Recipient of a 'European Women of Achievement' Award
