= Outsights =

Outsights is an independent scenario planning consultancy founded in 1998 by Richard O'Brien and Tim Bolderson. The company is based in Islington, London, with seven full-time employees and 30 associates. Outsights uses scenario planning and future thinking to help business, Government and organisations to anticipate, interpret and act upon important external developments in the outside world, and to plan strategies for several possible futures.

In 2006, Outsights created the Sigma Scan, an online database of trends and drivers over the next 50 years for the UK Government, in partnership with Ipsos MORI. Scenario planning is currently being used to help advise UK Government policy, for example in the "Tackling Obesities: Future Choices Project" which was launched by Health Minister Dawn Primolo in October 2007.

== Case studies in scenario planning ==
- Irdeto: Facing the future through scenario planning
