= Alan Budd =

British economist (1937–2023)

Sir Alan Budd GBE
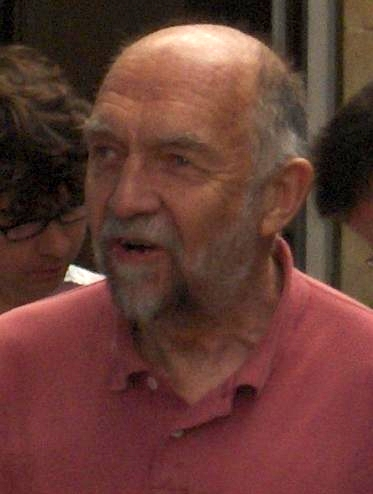
- Budd in 2008

Chairman of the Office for Budget Responsibility
- In office May 2010 – 4 October 2010
- Preceded by: office established
- Succeeded by: Robert Chote

Personal details
- Born: Alan Peter Budd; 16 November 1937 Bromley, Kent, England
- Died: 13 January 2023 (aged 85)
- Spouse: Susan Millott (m. 1964)
- Children: 3
- Education: London School of Economics; University of Oxford; University of Cambridge

Sir Alan Peter Budd (16 November 1937 – 13 January 2023) was a British economist, who was a founding member of the Bank of England's Monetary Policy Committee (MPC) in 1997.

Budd left the MPC in May 1999, and between August 1999 and 2008 was Provost of The Queen's College, Oxford.

Budd was temporarily head of Her Majesty's Government's Office for Budget Responsibility during 2010.

== Education ==
Budd went to Oundle School, a public school in Northamptonshire, and then studied at the London School of Economics where he received a B.Sc. degree in economics. He subsequently went to the University of Oxford where he received an MA degree and a D.Phil. degree and to the University of Cambridge where he obtained a Ph.D. degree.

His academic posts included the University of Southampton, Carnegie-Mellon University, University of Pittsburgh (Ford foundation visiting professor), and the University of New South Wales (Reserve Bank of Australia visiting professor).

== Economic positions ==
After various academic roles, he became senior economic advisor to HM Treasury between 1970 and 1974. Alan Budd was featured in Adam Curtis's 1992 documentary Pandora's Box, in which he was being interviewed about his time as economic advisor to the treasury.

From 1979 to 1981 he was Special Adviser at the Treasury in Margaret Thatcher's government. Reflecting on his position during this time, Budd expressed concerns that the policies that were implemented to allegedly reduce inflation might, in fact, have had a hidden agenda. In a documentary interview, Budd postulated that Thatcher's actual goal might have been to deliberately raise unemployment in order to reduce the strength of the working classes and re-create a reserve army of labour to allow capitalists to make high profits.

During the 1980s he was a professor of economics and director of the Centre for Economic Forecasting at the London Business School. Other appointments have included group economic adviser, Barclays Bank (1989–91), and membership of the advisory board for Research Councils (1990–91).

Between 1991 and 1997, he was chief economic adviser to the Treasury, and headed the government economic service.

Among his activities as an economist, he was a governor of the National Institute for Economic and Social Research; a founder member of the UK-Japan 21st Century Group; an executive editor of World Economics and a member of the editorial advisory board of the Oxford Review of Economic Policy. He was also a senior adviser to Credit Suisse First Boston and a consultant to the G8 Group. In 2005, he was appointed to the board of the IG Group, a spread betting firm founded by Stuart Wheeler.

== Public profile ==
Budd was a member of the Independent Review Panel on the Future Funding of the BBC (1999), and chairman of the Gambling Review Body which produced the Gambling Review Report (2001). In 2004 he was asked to investigate the circumstances surrounding the issue of a visa to the nanny of Kimberly Quinn, the lover of David Blunkett, the then Home Secretary; Budd's report concluded that there was no evidence that Mr Blunkett had personally interfered in the visa application, but that he was "able to establish a chain of events linking Mr Blunkett to the change in the decision on [the] application." Blunkett resigned as home secretary after being told in advance of the report's findings.

Budd was elected Provost (1999–2008) of The Queen's College, Oxford University and later was an Honorary Fellow of the college.

In May 2010 he came out of retirement to be the interim Chairman of the Office for Budget Responsibility, set up by Chancellor of the Exchequer George Osborne to assess the state of public finances and issue economic forecasts.

Budd described this as "the most exciting challenge of my professional life". In July 2010 it was announced that he would not continue in the role after his initial 3-month contract expired.

The Financial Times reported "His departure was expected and Budd had let it be known privately that he had never intended to serve as chairman of the OBR for anything other than a short period. His contract spanned the emergency Budget, leaving enough time thereafter to advise on the legislation needed to establish the OBR on a permanent basis."

== Personal life and death ==
Budd married Susan Millott in 1964, and they had three sons. He died of a suspected heart attack on 13 January 2023, at the age of 85.

== Honours ==
Budd was knighted in the 1997 New Year Honours. He was awarded an Honorary DSc degree by the University of Salford in 2008. He was appointed Knight Grand Cross of the Order of the British Empire (GBE) in the 2013 New Year Honours for services to economic policy and the Office for Budget Responsibility.

Preceded by New office	Chairman of the Office for Budget Responsibility; 2010	Succeeded by Robert Chote
