= François Bourguignon =

French economist (born 1945)

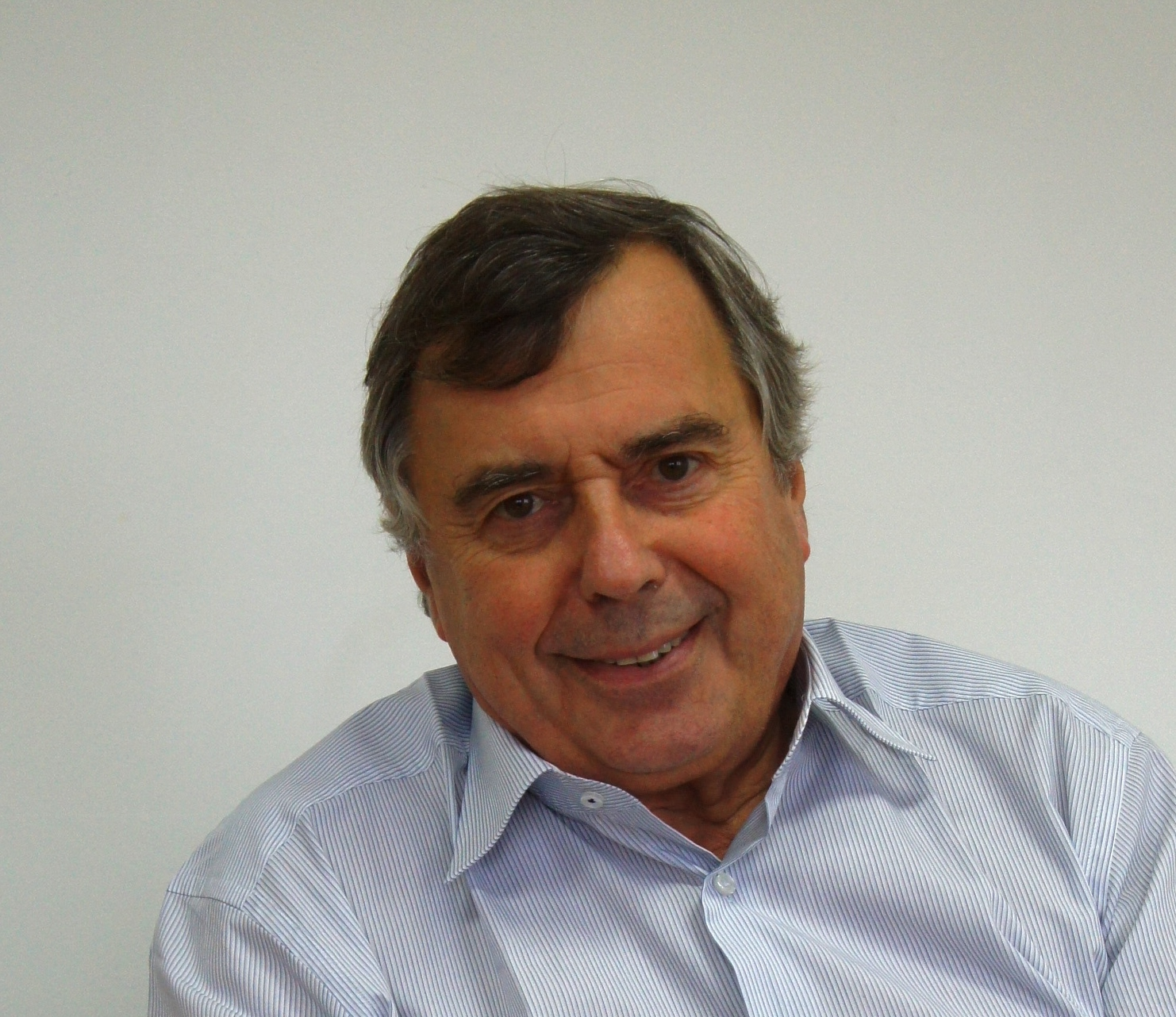

Chief Economist of the World Bank
- In office 2003–2007
- President: James Wolfensohn; Paul Wolfowitz
- Preceded by: Nicholas Stern
- Succeeded by: Justin Yifu Lin

Personal details
- Born: 22 May 1945 (age 81) Paris, France
- Education: ENSAE Paris (BS); Pierre and Marie Curie University (DEA); University of Western Ontario (PhD)

Academic work
- Institutions: Paris School of Economics
- Doctoral students: Bernard Salanié
- Awards: Dan David Prize (2016)
- Website: Information at IDEAS / RePEc

François Bourguignon (born May 22, 1945) is a former Chief Economist (2003–2007) of the World Bank. He has been the Director of the Paris School of Economics, and from 1985 to his retirement in 2013 a professor of economics at the École des Hautes Études en Sciences Sociales in Paris. In 2016, Bourguignon was awarded the Dan David Prize. He focuses on the study of income and wealth inequality, economy-wide country studies, international trade, trade and tax policy, redistribution and education.

== Education ==
Bourguignon is trained as a statistician at ENSAE Paris and has a PhD from the University of Western Ontario.

== Selected publications ==
=== Books ===
- Bourguignon, François; Atkinson, Anthony B. (2000). Handbook of income distribution. Amsterdam New York: Elvesier. ISBN 9780444816313.
- Bourguignon, François; Pereira da Silva, Luiz A. (2003). The impact of economic policies on poverty and income distribution: evaluation techniques and tools. Washington, DC: World Bank and Oxford University Press, New York. ISBN 9780821354919.
- Bourguignon, François; Lustig, Nora; Ferreira, Francisco (2005). The microeconomics of income distribution dynamics: in East Asia and Latin America. Washington, DC; New York: World Bank Oxford University Press. ISBN 9780821358610.
- Bourguignon, François; Bussolo, Maurizio; Pereira da Silva, Luiz A. (2008). The impact of macroeconomic policies on poverty and income distribution: macro-micro evaluation techniques and tools. Houndmills, Basingstoke, Hampshire; New York; Washington, DC: Palgrave Macmillan World Bank. ISBN 9780821357781.
- Bourguignon, François (2015). The Globalization of Inequality. Translated by Scott-Railton, Thomas. Princeton University Press. ISBN 9780691160528.

=== Chapters in books ===
- Bourguignon, François (2005), "The effect of economic growth on social structures", in Aghion, Philippe; Durlauf, Steven N. (eds.), Handbook of economic growth, vol. 1B, Amsterdam: Elsevier, pp. 1701–1748, ISBN 9780444520432.
- Bourguignon, François; Stern, Nicholas; Pereira da Silva, Luiz A. (2006), "Evaluating the poverty impact of economic policies: some analytical challenges", in Mody, Ashoka; Pattillo, Catherine (eds.), Macroeconomic policies and poverty, London; New York: Routledge, ISBN 041570071X. Pdf version.
- Bourguignon, François; Chakravarty, Satay R. (2009), "Multidimensional poverty orderings: theory and applications", in Kanbur, Ravi; Basu, Kaushik (eds.), Arguments for a better world: essays in honor of Amartya Sen | Volume I: Ethics, welfare, and measurement, Oxford; New York: Oxford University Press, pp. 337–362, ISBN 9780199239115.

=== Journal articles ===
- Bourguignon, François; Pereira da Silva, Luiz A. (2003). Pereira Da Silva, Luiz A.; Bourguignon, Francois (eds.). The impact of economic policies on poverty and income distribution: evaluation techniques and tools. World Bank and Oxford University Press, New York. doi:10.1596/0-8213-5491-4 (inactive 1 July 2025). hdl:10986/15090. ISBN 978-0-8213-5491-9.
- Bourguignon, François; Lustig, Nora; Ferreira, Francisco (2005). Lustig, Nora; Bourguignon, Francois; Ferreira, Francisco H. G. (eds.). The microeconomics of income distribution dynamics: in East Asia and Latin America. World Bank Oxford University Press. doi:10.1596/0-8213-5861-8 (inactive 1 July 2025). hdl:10986/14844. ISBN 978-0-8213-5861-0.
- Bourguignon, François; Sundberg, Mark (May 2007). "Aid effectiveness: opening the black box" (PDF). The American Economic Review. 97 (2). American Economic Association: 316–321. doi:10.1257/aer.97.2.316. JSTOR 30034468.
- Bourguignon, François; Ferrera, Francisco H.G.; Walton, Michael (August 2007). "Equity, efficiency and inequality traps: a research agenda". The Journal of Economic Inequality. 5 (2). Springer: 235–256. doi:10.1007/s10888-006-9042-8. S2CID 54090211.
- Bourguignon, François; Bussolo, Maurizio; Pereira da Silva, Luiz A. (2008). Pereira Da Silva, Luiz A.; Bourguignon, Francois; Bussolo, Maurizio (eds.). "The impact of macroeconomic policies on poverty and income distribution: macro-micro evaluation techniques and tools". Open Knowledge Repository. Palgrave Macmillan World Bank. doi:10.1596/978-0-8213-5778-1. hdl:10986/6586. ISBN 978-0-8213-5778-1.

== See also ==
- Poverty-Growth-Inequality Triangle

Diplomatic posts
Preceded by Nicholas Stern	Chief Economist of the World Bank; 2003–2007	Succeeded by Justin Yifu Lin
