= Poverty-Growth-Inequality Triangle =

Model in developmental economics

In developmental economics, the Poverty-Growth-Inequality Triangle (also called the Growth-Inequality-Poverty Triangle or GIP Triangle) refers to the idea that a country's change in poverty can be fully determined by its change in income growth and income inequality. According to the model, a development strategy must then also be based on income growth and income inequality. The Poverty-Growth-Inequality Triangle model was created by François Bourguignon, the former Chief Economist (2003-2007) of the World Bank.

== Background ==
The Poverty-Growth-Inequality Triangle was originally introduced by Bourguignon in a paper presented at the Conference on Poverty, Inequality and Growth in Paris on November 13, 2003. A modified version of the paper was presented at the Indian Council for Research on International Economic Relations in New Delhi on February 4, 2004.

Economists working for international organizations like the World Bank use the Poverty-Growth-Inequality Triangle to create poverty reduction strategies that include both steps to reduce inequality and stimulate growth. Economists have used the Poverty-Growth-Inequality Triangle to study poverty in both developing countries and developed countries, including China, Egypt, India, Mexico, and Nigeria.

In 2013, a study of the 138 countries over the period 2005 to 2010 found that the basic ideas of Poverty-Growth-Inequality Triangle hold and that both growth and inequality impact absolute poverty as Bourguignon described.

== Model ==
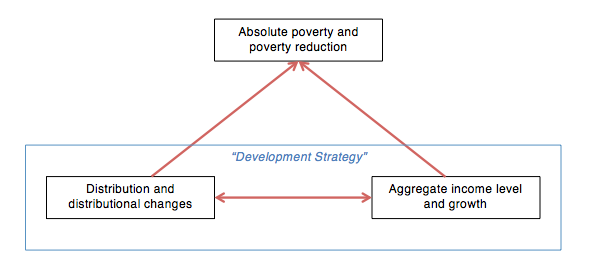
The Poverty-Growth-Inequality Triangle, by François Bourguignon.

The Poverty-Growth-Inequality Triangle can be drawn as a triangle with arrows pointing out of each corner. At the top of the triangle is "absolute poverty." This refers to the percent of the population below the income poverty line. At the bottom left of the triangle is "inequality" or "distribution." This refers to differences in income across a population. At the bottom right of the triangle is "growth." This refers to the change in income for a population (for example, a change in GDP).

The arrows pointing out of "absolute poverty," "growth," and "inequality" in the Poverty-Growth-Inequality Triangle represent cause and effect. In the model, inequality and growth affect each other and both of them affect absolute poverty.

Bourguignon defines the change in poverty as a function of growth, distribution, and changes in distribution: Δ poverty ≡ F(growth, distribution, Δ distribution). This equation assumes small changes in poverty. Bourguignon uses per capita income (GDP per capita) as the measure of growth and the Gini Index as the measure of inequality in his model.

== Significance ==
The Poverty-Growth-Inequality Triangle model differs from previous models of poverty in that it looks at the interactions between growth and inequality, rather than considering the two separately. On the Poverty-Growth-Inequality Triangle, the bottom points of the triangle are boxed together under the heading of "development strategy," because Bourguignon believed the mix of policies to reduce poverty should depend on that relationship between growth and inequality.

The Poverty-Growth-Inequality Triangle model suggests that effectively reducing poverty necessitates implementing comprehensive country-wide policies aimed at fostering economic growth and reducing inequality simultaneously. Strategies that prioritize only one of these dimensions may overlook potential opportunities to alleviate absolute poverty comprehensively. The model describes that a change in inequality affects absolute poverty in two ways. First, a change in relative poverty affects absolute poverty by immediately changing the number of people below the poverty line. Second, a change in relative poverty changes the growth elasticity of poverty. A redistribution of income means more poverty reduction for a given amount of growth. The consequence of this is that policies that focus only on growth without considering distribution limit poverty reduction in two ways. Economists theorize that for this reason sub-Saharan Africa and other less developed countries will not be able to meet poverty goals like the Millennium Development Goals through growth alone.

== Controversy ==
Critics argue that the Poverty-Growth-Inequality Triangle looks at aggregate concepts in a way that ignores the processes behind those concepts. Critics say terms like "poverty," "inequality," and "growth" are too broad. Instead, critics suggest that poverty should be traced back to individual behavior. Developmental economists Abhijit Banerjee and Esther Duflo argue that cross-country data cannot be used to give any meaningful insight on topics like poverty and inequality.

Critics also argue that the simplified nature of the model means that it misses factors that affect absolute poverty. Poverty itself can be considered a barrier for economic growth, meaning that the Poverty-Growth-Inequality Triangle would need to consider the effect of poverty on growth. Other economists argue that the triangle should include financial instability, crises, the business cycle, and their effects on poverty. Finally, many economists believe that there is a strong link between education, literacy rates, and poverty, and that the focus on decreasing poverty should lie in targeting these areas in addition to inequality and growth.

== See also ==
- François Bourguignon
- Developmental economics
- Poverty reduction
