= Green Fiscal Commission =

The Green Fiscal Commission (GFC) was a British body set up in 2007 to examine the best way of implementing green taxes (also known as ecotax) in the United Kingdom. GFC includes members from business, academia and the three main British political parties. It produced a final report "The case for green fiscal reform" in 2009.

GFC was chaired by Robert Napier, chairman of the Met Office and former chief executive of the World Wide Fund for Nature (WWF). GFC's director was Paul Ekins, Professor of Energy and Environment Policy at King's College London. The secretariat for the commission is provided by the Policy Studies Institute. The stated aim of the commission was to bring about green fiscal reform, that is to move taxation away from bads to goods.
