= Morville Chote =

British javelin thrower (1924–2023)

Personal information
- Nationality: British (English)
- Born: 6 October 1924 Luton, Bedfordshire, England
- Died: 17 March 2023 (aged 98)

Sport
- Sport: Athletics
- Event: javelin
- Club: British Army; University of Cambridge AC; Achilles Club

Morville Vincent William Chote (6 October 1924 – 17 March 2023) was a British javelin thrower who competed in the 1948 Summer Olympics.

== Biography ==
Chote was born in Luton, Bedfordshire on 6 October 1924. He was educated at Luton Modern School and studied modern languages at Emmanuel College, Cambridge.

He joined the British Army in 1943, serving in World War II. He was commissioned in the Queen's Royal Regiment in July 1944.

Chote finished third behind Jan Stendzenieks in the javelin throw event at the 1948 AAA Championships. Shortly afterwards he represented the Great Britain team at the 1948 Olympic Games in London, where he participated in the javelin throw competition, finishing 19th.

Chote worked for the Canada Life insurance company and died on 17 March 2023, at the age of 98.

He was the father of British economist Sir Robert Chote.
