= Julie Harvey (footballer) =

New Zealand footballer

Personal information
- Full name: Julie Harvey
- Place of birth: Wellington, New Zealand

Senior career*
Years	Team	Apps	(Gls)
- Miramar Rangers

International career
1981–1982	New Zealand	5	(0)
- * Club domestic league appearances and goals

Julie Harvey is a former association football player who represented New Zealand at international level. Harvey made her Football Ferns début in a 3–0 win over Switzerland on 14 October 1981, and finished her international career with five caps to her credit.
