= Ben Broadbent =

British economist

Deputy Governor of the Bank of England for Monetary Policy
- In office 1 July 2014 – 30 June 2024
- Governor: Mark Carney; Andrew Bailey
- Preceded by: Charlie Bean
- Succeeded by: Clare Lombardelli

Member of the Monetary Policy Committee
- In office 1 June 2011 – 30 June 2024
- Governor: Mervyn King; Mark Carney; Andrew Bailey

Personal details
- Born: 1 February 1965 (age 61)
- Education: Trinity Hall, Cambridge; Harvard University
- Profession: Economist, central & investment banker

Benjamin Robert Hamond Broadbent (born 1 February 1965) is a British economist and has been Deputy Governor for Monetary Policy at the Bank of England since 1 July 2014. He had previously been an external member of the Bank of England's Monetary Policy Committee between June 2011 and June 2014.

== Early life ==
He attended St Paul's School, London from 1977 to 1982, gained a first-class honours degree in economics from Trinity Hall, Cambridge, in 1988, and then studied for a Ph.D. at Harvard University, where he was a Fulbright Scholar.

== Career ==
After working for HM Treasury, he worked for the Bank of England, before becoming an assistant professor at Columbia University. He joined Goldman Sachs in 2000 as Senior European Economist, a position he held until 2011. In June 2011, he replaced the departing Andrew Sentance on the Bank of England Monetary Policy Committee.

Broadbent was reappointed, for a second term, Deputy Governor for the Bank of England on 31 May 2019.
