= David Chote =

New Zealand footballer

Personal information
- Full name: David A Chote
- Place of birth: New Zealand
- Position: Forward

Senior career*
Years	Team	Apps	(Gls)
1983–1997	Miramar Rangers	209	(68)

International career
1986–1988	New Zealand	4	(0)
- * Club domestic league appearances and goals

David Chote is a former association football player who represented New Zealand at international level.

Chote made his full All Whites debut in a 4–2 win over Fiji on 17 September 1986 and ended his international playing career with four A-international caps to his credit, his final cap an appearance in a 0–1 loss to Fiji on 19 November 1988.
