= Peter Whiting (footballer) =

New Zealand footballer

Personal information
- Full name: Peter Leslie Whiting
- Date of birth: 22 July 1939
- Place of birth: England
- Date of death: 12 October 2026 (aged 87)
- Place of death: New Zealand
- Position: Goalkeeper

Senior career*
Years	Team	Apps	(Gls)
- Miramar Rangers

International career
1962	New Zealand	2	(0)
- * Club domestic league appearances and goals

Peter Leslie Whiting (22 July 1939 – 12 October 2026) was a football (soccer) goalkeeper who represented New Zealand at international level., and Charlton Athletic in their Reserves.

Whiting played two official A-international matches for the All Whites in 1962 against visitors New Caledonia, the first a 4–1 on 2 June 1962, his second a 4–2 win on 4 June. They were to be his only official matches as New Zealand played no other official matches until 1967.

== Charlton Athletic ==
British Pathé released 90" of silent film footage in 1966 shot at Charlton's ground, ' The Valley (stadium) '. (Its identification number, is:- ID:VLVAAAKS5QBFWCFSFG612YK9AGW93). It was released on 7/12/1966. It's catalogued under the description:-

" U.K.: New Zealand Soccer star begins trial with Charlton Athletic in London. (1966). "

The synopsis says:-

" A young New Zealand soccer player, Peter Whiting, who has financed his own trip to Britain on the chance of playing for a British Professional team has started training with The London club, Charlton Athletic ".

Whiting, who was actually born in 1939 just a few miles from ' The Valley ', and left for New Zealand aged fourteen, experienced some injuries whilst at Charlton. He played two seasons in their Reserves, before returning to Australia.
