= Robert Chote =

British economist

Sir Robert Chote

Chairman of the UK Statistics Authority
- In office 1 June 2022 – 8 July 2025
- Preceded by: Sir David Norgrove

Chairman of the Office for Budget Responsibility
- In office 4 October 2010 – 4 October 2020
- Preceded by: Sir Alan Budd
- Succeeded by: Richard Hughes

Personal details
- Born: 24 January 1968 (age 58)
- Spouse: Baroness White of Tufnell Park (m. 1997)
- Children: 2
- Parent: Morville Chote (father)
- Education: Queens' College, Cambridge; City University, London; Johns Hopkins University

Sir Robert William Chote (born 24 January 1968) is a British economist and president of Trinity College, Oxford. Previously he was chair of the UK Statistics Authority and chairman of the Office of Budget Responsibility from 2010 to 2020.

== Education ==
Chote completed his secondary education at St Mary's College in Bitterne Park, Southampton. In 1989, he graduated in economics from Queens' College, Cambridge (where he was president of the Cambridge University Social Democrats and, after the merger of the SDP with the Liberals, chair of the Cambridge University Social and Liberal Democrats). He then studied journalism at City University, London, and international public policy at the School of Advanced International Studies at Johns Hopkins University in the United States.

== Career ==
Chote began his career as a reporter and columnist at The Independent and was named Young Financial Journalist of the Year in 1993 when working for the Independent on Sunday by the Wincott Foundation. He then moved to the Financial Times to become Economics Editor in 1995.

From 1999 to 2002, he served as an adviser to the senior management of the International Monetary Fund in Washington, D.C., where he worked under Stanley Fischer and Anne Krueger. Chote was appointed director of the Institute for Fiscal Studies in October 2002. He has also served as a member of the Statistics Advisory Committee of the Office for National Statistics.

In September 2010, he was appointed chairman of the Office of Budget Responsibility, succeeding Sir Alan Budd. This appointment was subject to Parliamentary approval, which was received. He started as chairman on 4 October 2010. As of 2015, Chote was paid a salary of between £150,000 and £154,999 by the department, making him one of the 328 most highly paid people in the British public sector at that time. He served two five-year terms and stepped down in 2020.

In March 2021, he began as the inaugural chair of the Northern Ireland Fiscal Council, which was established to provide independent scrutiny of the NI public finances.

On 1 June 2022, Chote was appointed chairman of the UK Statistics Authority. Chote also has a position as a senior advisor at Francis Maude Associates, a consultancy set up by Francis Maude.

In May 2024, Chote was appointed the next president of Trinity College, Oxford. He took up the position on 1 September 2025, succeeding Dame Hilary Boulding as the college's 29th president.

== Honours and awards ==
Chote was knighted in the 2021 New Year Honours for services to fiscal policy and the economy.

== Personal life ==
Since 1997, Chote has been married to Baroness Sharon White, the former chairman of the John Lewis Partnership and previously the chief executive of Ofcom. The couple has two children. He is the son of Olympic athlete Morville Chote.
