= Nicholas Stern, Baron Stern of Brentford =

British economist and academic (born 1946)

The Right Honourable The Lord Stern of Brentford CH FRS FBA FAcSS
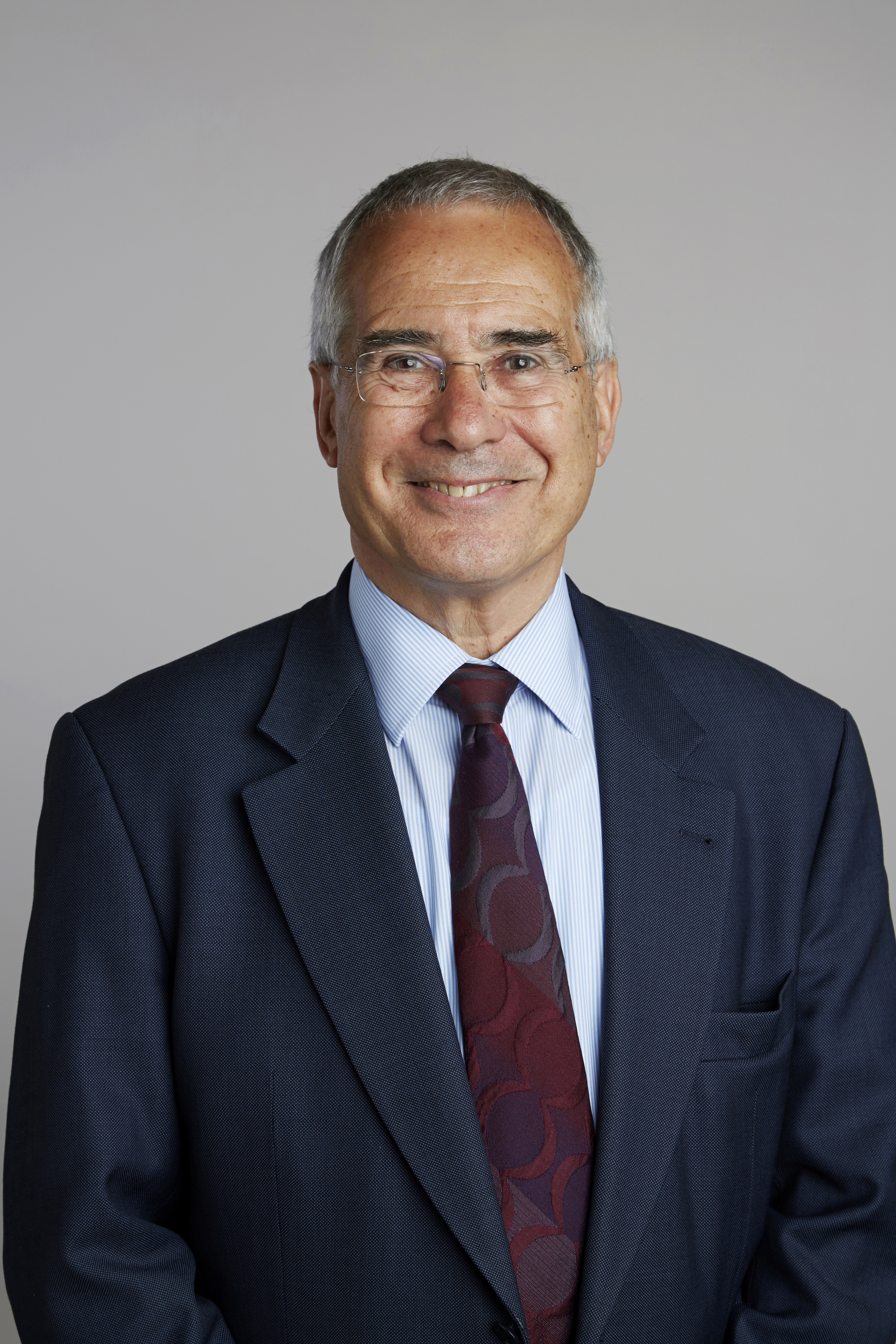
- Stern in 2015

President of the British Academy
- In office 2013–2017
- Preceded by: Adam Roberts
- Succeeded by: David Cannadine

Chief Economist of the World Bank
- In office July 2000 – 2003
- President: James Wolfensohn
- Preceded by: Joseph Stiglitz
- Succeeded by: François Bourguignon

Member of the House of Lords
- Lord Temporal
- Life peerage 10 December 2007

Personal details
- Born: Nicholas Herbert Stern; 22 April 1946 (age 80) Hammersmith, London, England
- Party: Crossbench
- Education: Peterhouse, Cambridge (BA); Nuffield College, Oxford (MA, DPhil)
- Website: Official website
- Scientific career
- Known for: Stern Review (2006)
- Awards: Fellow of the British Academy (1993); Blue Planet Prize (2009); Fellow of the Royal Society (2014); Member of the Order of the Companions of Honour (2017)
- Workplaces: University of Oxford; University of Warwick; London School of Economics; Collège de France; British Academy
- Thesis: Location and the Rate of Development: A Study in the Theory of Optimum Planning (1971)
- Doctoral advisor: James Mirrlees

Nicholas Herbert Stern, Baron Stern of Brentford, CH, FRS, FBA, FAcSS (born 22 April 1946), is a British economist, banker, and academic. He is the IG Patel Professor of Economics and Government and Chair of the Grantham Research Institute on Climate Change and the Environment at the London School of Economics (LSE), and 2010 Professor of Collège de France. He was President of the British Academy from 2013 to 2017, and was elected Fellow of the Royal Society in 2014.

== Education ==
After attending Latymer Upper School, Stern studied the Mathematical Tripos and was awarded a Bachelor of Arts degree in maths at Peterhouse, Cambridge in 1967. In 1971, his DPhil degree in economics at Nuffield College, Oxford, with thesis on the rate of economic development and the theory of optimum planning, was supervised by James Mirrlees, winner of the Nobel Prize in Economics in 1996.

== Career and research ==
=== 1970–2007 ===
He was a lecturer at the University of Oxford from 1970 to 1977 and served as a professor of economics at the University of Warwick from 1978 to 1987. From 1986 to 1993 he taught at the London School of Economics, becoming the Sir John Hicks Professor of Economics. From 1994 until 1999 he was the Chief Economist and Special Counsellor to the President of the European Bank for Reconstruction and Development. His research focused on economic development and growth, and he also wrote books on Kenya and the Green Revolution in India. Since 1999, he has been a member of the International Advisory Council of the Center for Social and Economic Research (CASE). From 1999 until 2000 Stern was Chairman of the consultancy London Economics founded by John Kay.

From 2000 to 2003 he was the Chief Economist and Senior Vice-president of the World Bank. Stern was then recruited by Gordon Brown, then Chancellor of the Exchequer, to work for the British government where, in 2003, he became second permanent secretary at HM Treasury, initially with responsibility for public finances, and head of the Government Economic Service. Having also been Director of Policy and Research for the Commission for Africa, in July 2005 he was appointed to conduct reviews on the economics of climate change and also of development, which led to the publication of the Stern Review. At the time, he ceased to be a second permanent secretary at the Treasury, though he retained the rank until retirement in 2007; the review team he headed was based in the Cabinet Office. It was reported that Stern's time at the Treasury was marked by tensions with his boss, Gordon Brown:

... several Whitehall sources told The Times that Mr Brown did not like some of the advice he received from Sir Nicholas, including some "home truths" about long-term trends in the economy and he never broke into the chancellor's tight-knit inner circle. ... He subsequently lacked a real role and spent most of his time working on major international reports on global warming and alleviating poverty in Africa. His doom-laden report on the risks of failing to address climate change, published in October, caused tensions within the Government by triggering a debate on environmental taxes and leading to calls for big policy changes.

=== The Stern Review (2005—2006) ===
The Stern Review Report on the Economics of Climate Change was produced by a team led by Stern at HM Treasury, and was released in October 2006. In the review, climate change is described as an economic externality, which is a type of market failure. Stern has subsequently referred to the climate change externality as the largest ever market failure:

Climate change is a result of the greatest market failure the world has seen. The evidence on the seriousness of the risks from inaction or delayed action is now overwhelming ... The problem of climate change involves a fundamental failure of markets: those who damage others by emitting greenhouse gases generally do not pay

Regulation, carbon taxes and carbon trading, along with pollution permits and property rights, are recommended to reduce greenhouse gas emissions. It is argued that the world economy can lower its greenhouse gas emissions at a significant but manageable cost. The review concludes that immediate reductions of greenhouse gas emissions are necessary to reduce the worst risks of climate change. The review's conclusions were widely reported in the press. Stern's relatively large cost estimates of 'business-as-usual' climate change damages received particular attention. These are the estimated damages that might occur should no further effort be made to cut greenhouse gas emissions.

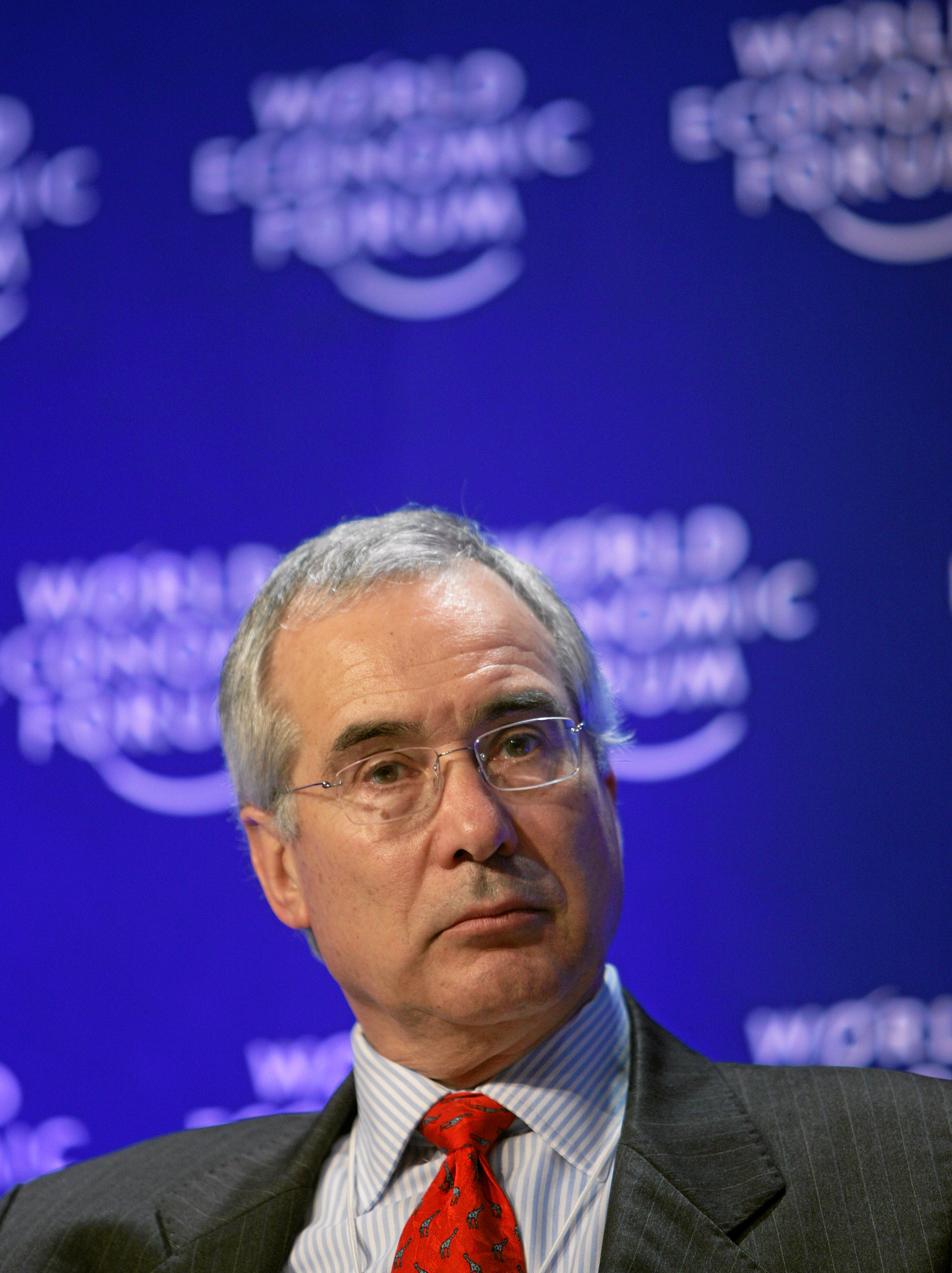
Stern at World Economic Forum annual meeting in Davos, January 2009

There has been a mixed reaction to the Stern Review from economists. Several economists have been critical of the review, for example, a paper by Byatt et al. (2006) describes the review as "deeply flawed". Some have supported the Review, while others have argued that Stern's conclusions are reasonable, even if the method by which he reached them is incorrect. The Stern Review team has responded to criticisms of the review in several papers. Stern has also gone on to say that he underestimated the risks of climate change in the Stern Review.

Stern's approach to discounting has been debated amongst economists. The discount rate allows economic effects occurring at different times to be compared. Stern used a discount rate in his calculation of the effects of "business-as-usual" climate change damages. A high discount rate reduces the calculated benefit of reducing greenhouse gas emissions. Using too low a discount rate wastes resources because it will result in too much investment in cutting emissions (Arrow et al., 1996, p. 130). Too high a discount rate will have the opposite effect, and lead to under-investment in cutting emissions. Most studies on the damages of climate change use a higher discount rate than that used in the Stern Review. Some economists support Stern's choice of discount rate (Cline, 2008; Shah, 2008 Heal, 2008) while others are critical (Yohe and Tol, 2008; Nordhaus, 2007).

Another criticism of the Stern Review is that it is a political rather than an analytical document. Writing in the Daily Telegraph newspaper, columnist Charles Moore compared the Stern Review to the UK Government's "dodgy dossier" on Iraqi weapons of mass destruction.

=== 2007—present ===
In a speech given in 2007 at the Australian National Press Club, Stern called for one per cent of gross global product to be employed in global warming-related environmental measures. He also joined the Cool Earth advisory board. In 2009, Stern linked recovery from the global economic crisis with an effective response to climate change. His book, Blueprint for a Safer Planet, was published in April 2009.

In June 2007, Stern became the first holder of the I. G. Patel Chair at the London School of Economics. In 2007, Nicholas Stern joined IDEAglobal as vice-chairman. In 2008, he was appointed Chair of the Grantham Research Institute on Climate Change and the Environment, a major new research centre also at LSE. He is Chair of the Centre for Climate Change Economics and Policy at Leeds University and LSE. Stern is co-chair of the Global Commission for the Economy and Climate, with Ngozi Okonjo-Iweala and Paul Polman.

In 2009, he published the non-fiction literary work, The Global Deal: Climate Change and the Creation of a New Era of Progress and Prosperity. The book examines climate change from an economist's perspective, and outlines the necessary steps toward achieving global economic growth while managing climate change. In 2009, he also became a member of the International Advisory Council of the Chinese sovereign wealth fund China Investment Corporation.

Stern is an advocate of vegetarianism as a climate change mitigation element.

He is a member of the scientific committee of the Fundacion IDEAS, Spain's Socialist Party's think tank.

In 2015, he was co-author of the report that launched the Global Apollo Programme, which calls for developed nations to commit to spending 0.02% of their GDP for 10 years, to fund co-ordinated research to make carbon-free baseload electricity less costly than electricity from coal by the year 2025.

After the successful United Nations Climate Change Conference in Paris (mid-December 2015), Stern appeared optimistic, saying, "If we get this right, it will be more powerful than the Industrial Revolution. A green race is going on." He also said

Where we can, we have to go to zero carbon, because of a growing population and a rising middle class in developing countries which wants the same standard of living the developed world already enjoys. GHGs must be cut by at least 50% around the world by 2050, with the rich, developed countries cutting by 80%, compared to 1990 levels. We are at the beginning of a technical revolution of the magnitude of the railway, the motor car ... The economic crisis is an opportunity to lay the foundation for the future ... You can tell a very positive story here.

In November 2015 he was commissioned by the UK Minister of Universities and Science, Jo Johnson, to chair a review of the Research Excellence Framework (REF) that is used in assessing the research performance of universities and research institutes in the UK. The report was published in July 2016.

In October 2021, Stern released a working paper stating that economists had grossly undervalued young lives in relation to the climate crisis. The manuscript is due to be published in the Economic Journal of the Royal Economic Society.

== Awards and honours ==
Stern was elected a Fellow of the British Academy in 1993; he is also an Honorary Fellow of the American Academy of Arts and Sciences and a Foreign Honorary Member of both the American Economic Association and the American Philosophical Society. In the 2004 Queen's Birthday Honours he was made a Knight Bachelor, for services to Economics. On 18 October 2007, it was announced that Stern would receive a life peerage and was to be made a non-party political peer (i.e. would sit as a cross-bencher in the House of Lords). He was duly created Baron Stern of Brentford, of Elsted in the County of West Sussex and of Wimbledon in the London Borough of Merton on 10 December 2007. He is, however, usually addressed as Lord Stern, or Lord Stern of Brentford.

In 2006, he was elected as an Honorary Fellow at Peterhouse, Cambridge, and he is also an Honorary Fellow of St Catherine's College, Oxford.

Stern was awarded an honorary Doctor of Science degree by the University of Warwick in 2006, an Honorary Doctor of International Relations degree in 2007 by the Geneva School of Diplomacy and International Relations, an Honorary Doctor of Letters by the University of Sheffield in 2008, an Honorary Doctor by the Technische Universität Berlin in 2009 and also in 2009 an honorary degree of Doctor of Science from the University of Brighton.

In 2009, Stern was also awarded the Blue Planet Prize for his contributions to research on global environmental problems.

Stern participated in one of the showings of The Age of Stupid at the RSA. At the after-showing webcast panel discussion was director Franny Armstrong, journalist George Monbiot, and the Met Office head of climate impacts Richard Betts. In 2009 Nicholas Stern lent his support to the 10:10 project, a movement encouraging people to take positive action on climate change by reducing their carbon emissions.

Stern received the 2010 BBVA Foundation Frontiers of Knowledge Award in the category of Climate Change for his "pioneering report [that] shaped and focused the discourse on the economics of climate change" and provided "a unique and robust basis for decision-making."

On 11 December 2013, Stern was awarded the 2013 Stephen H. Schneider Award for Outstanding Climate Science Communication by Climate One at The Commonwealth Club in San Francisco, California.

Stern was elected a Fellow of the Royal Society (FRS) in 2014 in recognition of his work challenging the world view on the economics of climate change. In 2016, he was elected a Fellow of the Academy of Social Sciences (FAcSS).

Stern was appointed Member of the Order of the Companions of Honour (CH) in the 2017 Birthday Honours for services to economics, international relations, and tackling climate change.

The Kiel Institute for the World Economy announced, that Stern will be awarded the Bernhard Harms Prize 2021.

== Personal life ==
Stern is the son of the late Bert Stern and Marion Stern and nephew of Donald Swann, half of the Flanders and Swann duo.

== Works ==
- A Strategy for Development, World Bank Publications, 2002 (ISBN 978-0821349809).
- The Economics of Climate Change: The Stern Review, Cambridge University Press, 2007 (ISBN 978-0521700801).
- A Blueprint for a Safer Planet: How to Manage Climate Change and Create a New Era of Progress and Prosperity, Bodley Head, PublicAffairs, 2009 (ISBN 978-1-84792-037-9).
- The Global Deal: Climate Change and the Creation of a New Era of Progress and Prosperity, 2009 (ISBN 978-1586486693).
- Why Are We Waiting? The Logic, Urgency, and Promise of Tackling Climate Change, MIT Press, 2015 (ISBN 9780262029186).

Diplomatic posts
Preceded by Joseph Stiglitz	Chief Economist of the World Bank; 2000–2003	Succeeded by François Bourguignon
Non-profit organization positions
Preceded by Adam Roberts	President of the British Academy; 2013–2017	Succeeded by David Cannadine
Orders of precedence in the United Kingdom
Preceded by The Lord Janvrin	Gentlemen; Baron Stern of Brentford	Followed by The Lord Smith of Kelvin
