= Charlie Bean (economist) =

British economist

Sir Charlie Bean
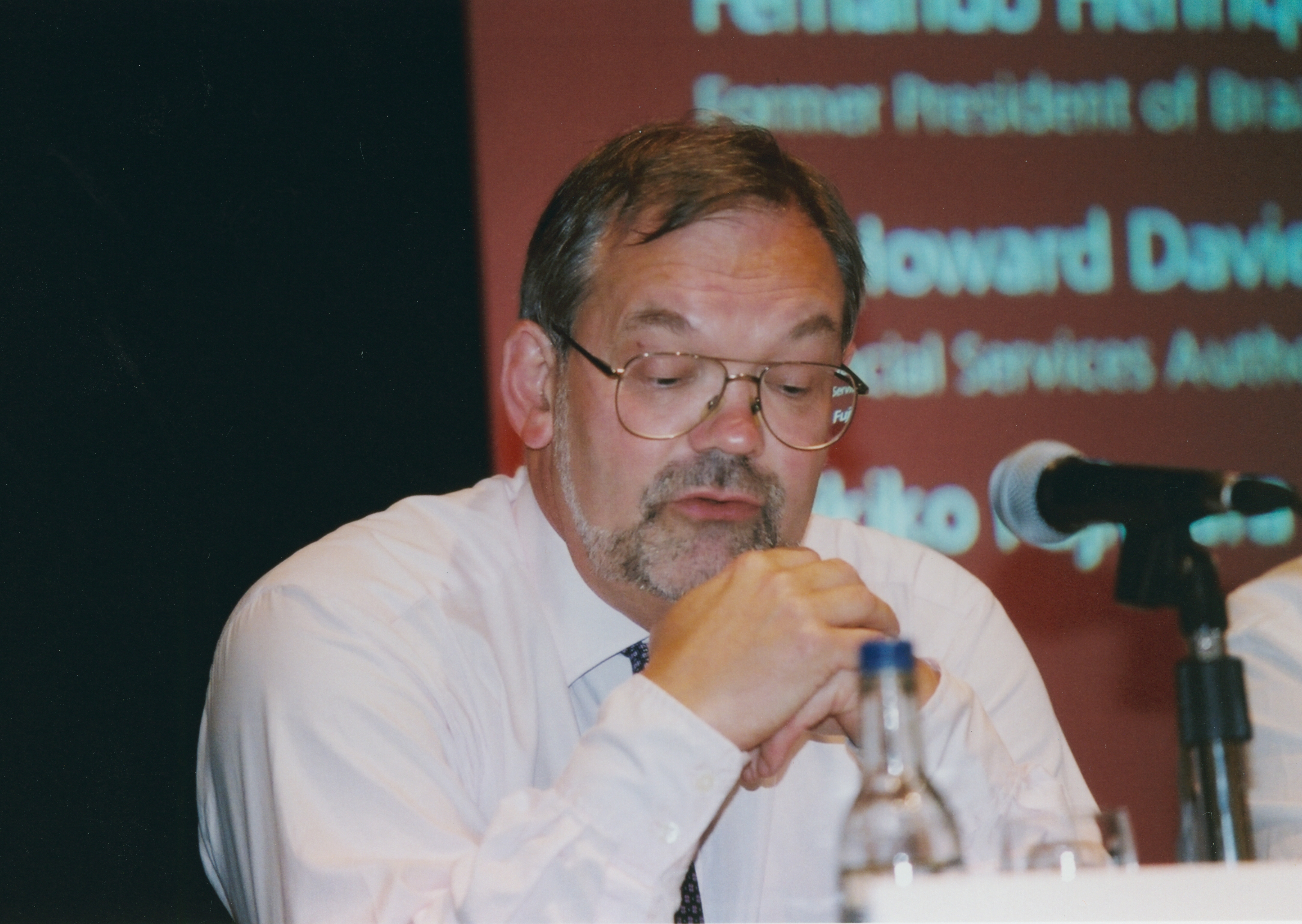

Deputy Governor of the Bank of England for Monetary Policy
- In office 1 July 2008 – 30 June 2014
- Governor: Mervyn King; Mark Carney
- Preceded by: Rachel Lomax
- Succeeded by: Ben Broadbent

Member of the Monetary Policy Committee
- In office October 2000 – 30 June 2014
- Governor: Sir Edward George (2000–2003); Mervyn King (2003–2013); Mark Carney (2013–2014)

Personal details
- Born: 16 September 1953 (age 72)
- Education: Emmanuel College, Cambridge; Massachusetts Institute of Technology
- Profession: Economist, central banker

Academic background
- Doctoral advisor: Robert Solow

Academic work
- Doctoral students: Fabrizio Zilibotti
- Website: Information at IDEAS / RePEc

Sir Charles Richard Bean (born 16 September 1953) is a British economist and Professor of Economics at the London School of Economics. He was previously Deputy Governor for Monetary Policy at the Bank of England from 1 July 2008 until 30 June 2014. From 2000 to 2008, he served as Chief Economist at the Bank.

Bean attended Brentwood School and Emmanuel College, Cambridge, and was a contemporary of the comedian Griff Rhys Jones at both, and the writer Douglas Adams and the Member of Parliament Fabian Hamilton at Brentwood School. He gained a PhD degree at the Massachusetts Institute of Technology in 1981 with a thesis titled Essays in unemployment and economic activity under the supervision of Robert Solow. In 1990 he was visiting professor at Stanford University in 1990, and then a lecturer at the London School of Economics, becoming a professor in 1990 and head of the Economics Department in 1999.

He has published articles on European unemployment, the Economic and Monetary Union, and on macroeconomics generally. He was Managing Editor of the Review of Economic Studies from 1986 to 1990. Bean has also served in a variety of public policy roles, such as consultant to Her Majesty's Treasury and as special adviser to both the Treasury Committee of the House of Commons and to the Economic and Monetary Affairs Committee of the European Parliament. He was a special adviser to the House of Lords enquiry into the European Central Bank.

He was knighted in the 2014 Birthday Honours for services to monetary policy and central banking. He is a fellow of the European Economic Association.
