= Clare Lombardelli =

British economist

Clare Lombardelli CB FAcSS is a British economist. She has been deputy governor for monetary policy of the Bank of England from 1 July 2024, and on the nine-member monetary policy committee (MPC).

She earned a bachelor's degree in philosophy, politics and economics from Magdalen College, Oxford, and a master's degree in economics from the London School of Economics.

She began her career at the Bank of England, then worked for HM Treasury and as an advisor to David Cameron, George Osborne, Philip Hammond, Sajid Javid and Rishi Sunak.

Lombardelli served as the OECD's chief economist before rejoining the Bank of England as Deputy Governor for Monetary Policy on 1 July 2024. In that role, she is a member of the Monetary Policy Committee, the Financial Policy Committee and the Bank's Court of Directors.

She was elected Fellow of the Academy of Social Sciences in 2021. She was appointed Companion of the Order of the Bath (CB) for public service in the 2022 Birthday Honours.
