= Dual interest rates =

Dual interest rates refers to a policy implemented by central banks which aims to influence lending rates independently of deposit rates as a means of stimulating economic activity. Policies similar to this have long been a feature of Chinese monetary policy. More recently dual interest rates have been introduced by the European Central Bank (ECB), under its TLTRO II scheme as an unconventional monetary policy. More aggressive use of these policies has been suggested as an effective alternative to negative interest rates, quantitative easing (QE) and forward guidance.

== Historical context ==
Central banks have always operated with a number of different interest rates. Historically, the Federal Reserve has relied on two interest rates, the discount rate, and the federal funds rate. The federal funds rate is the primary policy rate, which is aimed at determining money market rates, at which banks lend to each other. In conventional central banking, the discount rate is set above the policy rate, as a disincentive to banks who are in need of short-term liquidity. Under a policy of dual interest rates, however, central banks determine the quantity of credit they will make available to the banking system at an interest rate which is sufficiently attractive to encourage them to make new loans.

Under the ECB’s TLTRO III scheme, banks could obtain access to funds from the ECB at a rate as low as -1%, that is, -50 basis points below the standard deposit rate. Access to these favourable terms is contingent on banks making new loans (except for mortgage lending). Research by the ECB has found that the introduction of dual rates "had a strong positive effect on bank credit provision during the COVID-19 crisis, helping to sustain economic activity [and was not] accompanied by excessive risk-taking".

== Supporters ==
Recognition of the monetary power of dual interest rates is relatively recent. Oxford economics professor, Simon Wren-Lewis, advocated the policy for the ECB in July 2019, suggesting that the ECB could cut rates for borrowers well below the lower bound, while keeping interest rates for depositors at the lower bound. Harvard University’s and Bank of England's MPC member Megan Greene suggested that the ECB could use dual interest rates to offset an apparent weakening of the European economic outlook, citing work by the Irish economist, Eric Lonergan, which argues that the ECB’s TLTRO was the most significant monetary innovation since the Great Financial Crisis, due to the possibility of deploying dual interest rates.

In the EU, a growing number of academics, bankers, and activist organisations have advocated for the ECB to introduce "green dual rates" as a means to encourage bank lending towards energy-efficiency and renewables projects. ECB President Christine Lagarde has repeatedly said she was interested in this concept.

== Concerns ==
The main concern with dual interest rates is the potential impact on the central bank’s balance sheet. If the interest rate at which the targeted loans are made to banks falls below the interest rate which the central bank earns on reserves, the operation would cause a decline in the central bank’s net interest income. Mario Draghi, has argued that the impact on central banks’ profitability should not be a consideration in monetary policy, what matters is the effect on inflation. Other economists have expressed concern about banks’ ability to game dual interest rates.
