= Simon Haskel, Baron Haskel =

British Labour politician and life peer

The Right Honourable The Lord Haskel
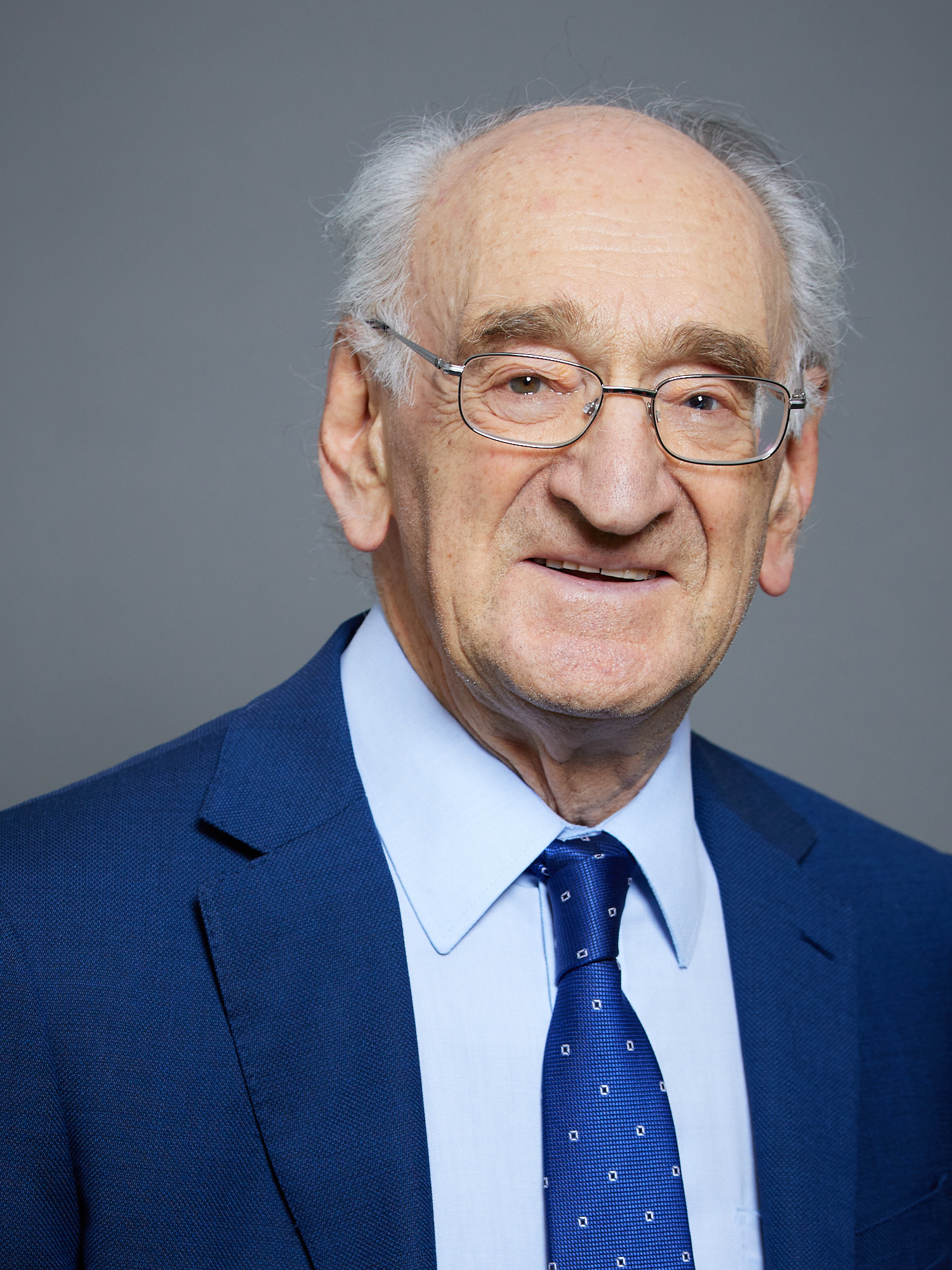
- Official portrait, 2022

Deputy Speaker of the House of Lords
- In office 9 December 2002 – 21 May 2026

Lord-in-waiting Government Whip
- In office 8 May 1997 – 28 August 1998
- Prime Minister: Tony Blair
- Preceded by: The Lord Lucas
- Succeeded by: The Baroness Ramsay of Cartvale

Member of the House of Lords
- Lord Temporal
- Life peerage 4 October 1993 – 21 May 2026

Personal details
- Born: 9 October 1934 (age 92)
- Party: Labour
- Education: University of Salford

Simon Haskel, Baron Haskel (born 9 October 1934) is a retired British Labour Party politician and life peer.

== Life and career ==
Simon Haskel was born in Lithuania, and educated at Sedbergh School and Salford College of Advanced Technology (now the University of Salford), where he graduated with a BSc in Textile Technology. He then built up his own national and international textile firm, the Perrotts Group Plc.

Haskel was created a life peer in the House of Lords on 4 October 1993, taking the title Baron Haskel, of Higher Broughton in the County of Greater Manchester. He served as a Lord-in-Waiting in the first Blair ministry from May 1997 to August 1998.

He retired from the House of Lords on 21 May 2026.

His son, Jonathan Haskel, is a professor of economics at Imperial College Business School, chair of the Office for Budget Responsibility and former member of the Bank of England's Monetary Policy Committee (MPC).

Orders of precedence in the United Kingdom
Preceded by The Lord Woolf	Gentlemen; Baron Haskel	Followed by The Lord Dixon-Smith
