= Michael Saunders (economist) =

British economist with Citigroup

- Education: London School of Economics
- Occupation: Economist
- Title: Head of European Economics, Citigroup

Michael Saunders is a British economist, and a senior economic advisor at the consultancy Oxford Economics. In August 2016 he became an external member of the Bank of England's Monetary Policy Committee, replacing Martin Weale.

Saunders studied econometrics at the London School of Economics (LSE).

Saunders worked for a short time as an economist at Greenwell Montagu (now HSBC) and the Institute for Fiscal Studies, before joining Citigroup, in 1990, rising to become Head of European Economics.
