= Ian McCafferty (economist) =

British economist (born 1956)

Ian Alexander McCafferty CBE (born 1 July 1956) is a British economist, who served on the Bank of England's Monetary Policy Committee (MPC). He joined in September 2012, following a time as Chief Economic Adviser to the Confederation of British Industry (CBI).

McCafferty was educated at Dulwich College, the University of Durham (Bachelor's) and the University of Amsterdam (Master's equivalent). Before joining the CBI in 2001, he worked at the International Chamber of Commerce, The Economist, Baring Securities, Natwest Markets and BP.

In May 2018, it was announced that McCafferty would be leaving the MPC, and would be replaced by Jonathan Haskel from 1 September.

He was appointed a Commander of the Order of the British Empire (CBE) in the 2019 New Year Honours for services to the Economy.
