= Ian Plenderleith =

Ian Plenderleith CBE (born 27 September 1943) was a member of the Bank of England's Monetary Policy Committee from June 1997 to May 2002.

He was a deputy governor of the South African Reserve Bank from January 2003 until 2005.

He is a former chairman of Morgan Stanley since 2011 and the Board of Governors at Reed's School, Cobham.
