= Marian Bell (economist) =

British economist

Marian Patricia Bell, CBE (born 28 October 1957) is a British consultant economist, and was a member of the Bank of England's Monetary Policy Committee from June 2002 to June 2005.

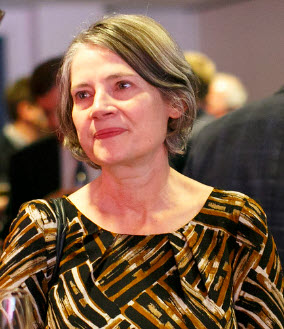
Marian Bell in 2015.

== Education ==
She was educated at Heriots Wood Grammar School, Harrow; Hertford College, Oxford (BA Philosophy, Politics and Economics) and Birkbeck, University of London (MSc Economics).

== Career ==
Bell was at the London Enterprise Agency from 1980 to 1982, she then joined the Royal Bank of Scotland as an economist from 1982 to 1989. In 1989 Bell joined Her Majesty's Treasury as an economic adviser and in 1991 rejoined the Royal Bank of Scotland where she set up and ran the research function of the treasury and capital markets. From 2000 to 2002 Bell was director of Alpha Economic and from 2002 to 2005 was an external member of the Monetary Policy Committee at the Bank of England appointed by the Chancellor of the Exchequer to set monetary policy. Bell was appointed to the Fiscal Policy Panel States of Jersey from 2007 to 2014 and the International Advisory Council of Zurich Financial Services from 2007. She was on the Fiscal Policy Panel States of Jersey, Channel Islands providing independent advice on fiscal policy from 2010 to 2011, and Governor of the National Institute of Economic and Social Research from 2014. Bell has been the non-executive director of the Emerging Health Threats Forum from 2006 to 2012 and vice-chair of the Contemporary Dance Trust.

In 2005 Bell was appointed a Commander of the Order of the British Empire (CBE) for her services to macroeconomics and fiscal regulation.

== Personal life ==
Bell is married with 2 children.
