= Jonathan Haskel =

British economist, and academic

Jonathan Haskel CBE
- Haskel in 2024
- Born: Jonathan Edward Haskel; 13 August 1963 (age 63); London, England
- Education: University of Bristol, London School of Economics
- Occupations: Chair of the Office for Budget Responsibility, Professor of Economics, Imperial College Business School, Imperial College London and External Member, Monetary Policy Committee, Bank of England
- Honours: Commander of the Order of the British Empire
- Website: https://www.imperial.ac.uk/people/j.haskel

Jonathan Edward Haskel (born 13 August 1963) is a British economist. He is currently Chair of the Office of Budget Responsibility, a role he took up on 1st September 2026.

Haskel is a former board member of the UK Statistics Authority, a former member of the Bank of England's Monetary Policy Committee and a former member of the Financial Conduct Authority Competition Decisions Committee and the Payment System Regulator Enforcement and Competition Decisions Committee.

He is the son of Simon Haskel.

== Early life ==
Haskel obtained a BSc at the University of Bristol and a PhD at the London School of Economics.

== Academic career ==
Prior to joining Imperial College London, Haskel was a professor and head of the economics department at Queen Mary University of London.

Haskel has taught at the University of Bristol and London Business School and been a visiting professor at the Tuck School of Business, Dartmouth College, US; Stern School of Business, New York University, US; and visiting researcher at the Australian National University.

Haskel is currently on long-term leave from his position as Professor of economics at Imperial College Business School, specialising in innovation and productivity.

== Other roles ==
In February 2016, he was appointed as a non-executive director of the UK Statistics Authority. A position he held until January 2023.

In September 2015, Haskel has been appointed as a member of the Financial Conduct Authority Competition Decisions Committee and the Payment System Regulator Enforcement and Competition Decisions Committee.

In May 2018, it was announced that Haskel would become a member of the Bank of England's Monetary Policy Committee (MPC), replacing Ian McCafferty from 1 September. He was in the MPC until August 2024. There were four women on the five-person shortlist. He was appointed Commander of the Order of the British Empire in the 2018 Birthday Honours.

In June 2026, Haskel was nominated as the preferred candidate for Chair of the Office for Budget Responsibility, subject to parliamentary approval.

== Publications ==
- Capitalism Without Capital: The Rise of the Intangible Economy (co-author, Stian Westlake)

== Personal life ==
He is the son of politician Simon Haskel. He is married to the artist Sue Haskel, and they have two daughters. He is Jewish, and of Lithuanian extraction via his father.
