= Swati Dhingra =

Indian economist

Swati Dhingra (born 1980) is an Associate Professor of Economics at the London School of Economics and an external member of the Bank of England's Monetary Policy Committee. She was reappointed in February 2025 for a second three-year term ending on 8 August 2028.

== Early life and education ==
She hails from Saharanpur, Uttar Pradesh. Her parents moved to India during the 1947 partition and are into a small business of buying and selling shawls. She earned her undergraduate degree from Delhi University, holds an MA from the Delhi School of Economics and obtained an MS and a PhD in Economics from the University of Wisconsin–Madison. She did a post doctoral fellowship at Princeton University. She lives with her partner in Islington, north London.

She has been a prominent critic of Brexit.
