= Martin Weale =

British economist

- Born: Martin Robert Weale; 4 December 1955 (age 70); London, United Kingdom

Academic background
- Education: University of Cambridge (MA 1977, ScD 2006)

Academic work
- Discipline: Macroeconomics, Microeconomics, Econometrics
- Institutions: King's College London (2016–present); NIESR (1995-2010); Bank of England (2010-2016)
- Awards: Commander of the British Empire (1999); Honorary DsC from City University of London (2007)

Martin Robert Weale CBE (born 4 December 1955) is a British economist. He was educated at Highgate School and Clare College, Cambridge, where he qualified for an MA in economics, with first-class honours, and was later a fellow from 1981 to 1995. On 5 July 2010 it was announced that he would join the Bank of England's Monetary Policy Committee, replacing Kate Barker. He was in turn replaced by Michael Saunders, attending his last meeting in July 2016.

Since 1995, he has also held the position of director at the National Institute of Economic and Social Research (NIESR). He was made a Commander of the Most Excellent Order of the British Empire (CBE) in 1999 for services to economics after contributing to a report for the Treasury and the Bank of England into the Average Earnings Index. As of 2010 he was a part-time professor at Queen Mary, University of London.

At NIESR, he has "written hundreds of studies and reports for a wide range of bodies and governments". A 2010 paper for the European Commission argued that "Britain's long boom under Labour was based on unsustainable consumption" and that "the budget deficit has to be closed at some point ... You cannot put it off forever on the grounds that the economy might never be able to stand it."

Since leaving the Monetary Policy Committee he has become Professor of Economics at King's College London, where he lectures on macroeconomic policy. He has joined the panel of expert economists at the Office for National Statistics and is an associate of the Centre for Macroeconomics at the London School of Economics. He was a founding trustee of Alzheimer's Research UK (formally Alzheimer's Research Trust). On 27 September 2010, Weale began a five-year term as a trustee of the Kennedy Memorial Trust.
