= Paul Fisher (economist) =

British economist

Paul Fisher OBE

Chair of the London Bullion Market Association
- Incumbent
- Assumed office September 2016

Chair of the London Institute of Banking and Finance
- Incumbent
- Assumed office June 2011

Personal details
- Education: University of Bristol; University of Warwick
- Profession: Economist

Paul Gregory Fisher (born 7 September 1958) is a British economist, who left the Bank of England in July 2016 after 26 years service. In September 2016 he was appointed chair of the London Bullion Market Association and in December 2016, he became a non-executive director at the UK Debt Management Office. Fisher has been a visiting professor at Richmond, The American International University in London since 2012; and is a senior research fellow in the new DAFM Centre of the Business School at King's College London. He was chair of the board of trustees at the London Institute of Banking and Finance, from 2011 to 2017.

Since July 2016, he has also been a Senior Associate/Fellow at the Cambridge Institute for Sustainability Leadership (CISL), where he works on issues around climate change and the financial sector in a pro bono capacity. CISL successfully nominated him to be a member of the EU High-Level Experts Group on Sustainable Finance from January 2017 to January 2018; the UK Green Finance Task Force from September 2017 to March 2018; and also as vice-chair of the CISL-supported Banking Environment Initiative.

Previously executive director of the Bank of England's Markets Directorate, he was appointed to the Bank of England's interest rate-setting Monetary Policy Committee from March 2009 to July 2014. Following a reorganisation at the bank, Fisher relinquished his membership of the MPC with effect from 1 August 2014, replaced by Nemat Shafik. He was appointed as Deputy Head of the Prudential Regulation Authority at the Bank of England in July 2014 and to its board from September 2015.

Fisher holds a BSc in economics with statistics from the University of Bristol, an MA in economics from the University of Warwick and a PhD in macroeconomic modelling, also from the University of Warwick.
