= TLTRO =

European Central Bank monetary policy instruments

The Targeted Longer-Term Refinancing Operations (TLTROs) are unconventional monetary policy instruments issued by the European Central Bank (ECB) to provide long-term financing to Eurozone credit institutions. Distinct from standard open market operations, TLTROs are conditional: the favorable interest rates offered are contingent upon participating banks granting loans to the real economy, specifically to non-financial corporations and households (excluding residential mortgages). The primary objective of these operations is to incentivize bank lending, prevent credit contraction, and ensure that monetary policy effectively stimulates economic activity and inflation towards the ECB's target.

== History ==
The program has been implemented through three distinct series: TLTRO I (launched in 2014), TLTRO II (2016), and TLTRO III (2019). The framework was significantly recalibrated in response to the COVID-19 pandemic to avert a credit crunch. In 2020, the ECB introduced new modalities for TLTRO III, raising borrowing allowances to 55% of a bank's eligible loan portfolio and lowering interest rates to as low as -1%—rates below the standard deposit facility—for banks that met specific lending thresholds. These measures were temporarily supplemented by Pandemic Emergency Longer-Term Refinancing Operations (PELTROs) to further ensure liquidity stability.

The mechanism operates through a "dual interest rate" policy, acting as a form of credit guidance where the central bank serves as the lender and commercial banks as intermediaries. By differentiating the cost of funding based on lending performance, the ECB effectively subsidizes commercial banks to maintain or expand their loan books during economic downturns. Academic analysis and ECB research suggest that this conditionality successfully enhanced financing conditions and supported credit flows during the pandemic without leading to excessive risk-taking by financial institutions.

The operations have faced scrutiny and sparked debate regarding their future application. Critics and some economists have characterized the provision of negative interest rates as a form of "helicopter money" or a direct wealth transfer to the banking sector. Conversely, think tanks and political leaders, including French President Emmanuel Macron, have called for the evolution of the tool into "Green TLTROs." These would align monetary policy with climate goals by offering discounted funding specifically for green projects, mirroring similar differentiated rate policies adopted by the Bank of Japan and the People's Bank of China in 2021.
