= Spencer Dale =

British economist

- Born: January 12, 1967 (age 59)
- Education: University of Wales (University College Cardiff), University of Warwick
- Occupation: Chief Economist
- Employer: BP
- Known for: Monetary policy economics
- Website: www.bp.com/en/global/corporate/energy-economics/spencer-dale-group-chief-economist.html

Spencer Dale

Member of the Monetary Policy Committee
- In office July 2008 – May 2014
- Governor: Mervyn King (2003–2013); Mark Carney (2013-2014)

Spencer Dale (born 12 January 1967) is a British economist who sat on the Bank of England's Monetary Policy Committee from 2008 through 2014, including a period as Chief Economist. He is currently the group chief economist of BP.

Dale was educated at the University of Wales (University College Cardiff), gaining BSc in Economics in 1988 and at the University of Warwick, gaining an MSc in Economics in 1989, whereupon he immediately joined the Bank of England. He was appointed to the position of Chief Economist on 1 July 2008. He finished being Chief Economist with effect from 1 June 2014, becoming the Bank's Executive Director for Financial Stability Strategy and Risk, moving from the Monetary Policy Committee to the Financial Policy Committee.

On 4 August 2014 it was announced that Dale would leave his post at the Bank of England in October 2014 to take up the position of Chief Economist at BP. He manages BP's global economics team and provides economic input into the firm's commercial decisions. BP's economics team also produces the annual Statistical Review of World Energy and Energy Outlook.
