= Christopher Allsopp =

British economist (1941-2025)

Christopher Allsopp (6 April 1941—5 March 2025) was a British economist. He was Director of the Oxford Institute for Energy Studies from 2006 to 2013, was emeritus Fellow of New College, Oxford, and a Reader in Economic Policy at the University of Oxford.

A former director of the Bank of England (1997–2000) and Member of its Monetary Policy Committee (2000–2003), he has completed a Review of Statistics for Economic Policymaking (the 'Allsopp Review'). He was the Editor of the Oxford Review of Economic Policy and a Director of Oxford Economic Forecasting. Previous activities include working at HM Treasury, the OECD and the Bank of England (where he was Adviser from 1980 to 1983) as well as extensive involvement with domestic and international policy issues as consultant to international institutions and private sector organisations. He has published extensively on monetary, fiscal and exchange rate issues as well as the problems of economic reform and transition.

His involvement in the economics of oil and other energy issues goes back to the shocks of the 1970s.
