= Huw Pill =

Welsh economist

Member of the Monetary Policy Committee
- Incumbent
- Assumed office September 2021
- Governor: Andrew Bailey (2020-)

Personal details
- Education: University College, Oxford (B.A.); Stanford University (PhD)
- Profession: Economist

Huw Pill is a Welsh economist, and the chief economist of the Bank of England since September 2021, succeeding Andy Haldane.

Pill studied philosophy, politics and economics at University College, Oxford, and graduated in 1989. He earned a doctorate in economics from Stanford University in 1995.

He worked as an economist at the Bank of England from 1990 to 1992. After graduating from Stanford, he was appointed assistant professor of business administration at Harvard University. He left Harvard to work at the European Central Bank (ECB) for a couple of years and returned to Harvard as an associate professor in 2003. In 2004, he worked at the ECB again and left to become chief European economist for Goldman Sachs in 2011. From 2019 to 2021 he worked as senior lecturer at Harvard.

== Publications ==
- Institutions, Macroeconomics and the Global Economy (2003, co-author)
