= Direct operations =

Direct operations is the term for when a central bank purchases bonds directly from its government.

Direct operations work as follows: Governments typically sell bonds when their expenditures exceed revenue from taxes (this is known as a budget deficit). This issuance of bonds occurs is termed the primary market, and the value of the outstanding bonds constitutes a national debt.

Paying interest on outstanding bonds means tax rates will be higher, but national debts have an advantage: they can be extremely useful for conducting monetary policy. When a central bank would like to increase the money supply, it can merely purchase previously-issued bonds. When it would like to contract the money supply, it can sell them. This is known as the secondary market, but for this to work, the bonds, of course, have to have been issued previously in the primary market.

But if a country does not have a significant national debt, direct operations are called for. Essentially, the government prints and sells bonds to the central bank on an ad hoc basis; the central bank in turns issues currency to pay for them. Essentially the government is provided with cash to meet its needs, although it has created a corresponding liability.
