= Megan Greene =

American economist

Megan Greene is an American economist, and was the global chief economist at Kroll Inc. from September 2021 to June 2023.

She joined the Bank of England's Monetary Policy Committee (MPC) as an external member on a three-year term on 5 July 2023, replacing Silvana Tenreyro.

Greene earned a bachelor's degree in political economy from Princeton University, and a master's degree in international relations from Nuffield College, Oxford.

Greene is a senior fellow at the Watson Institute for International and Public Affairs at Brown University, and a board member of the academic advisory committee at the Federal Reserve Bank of San Francisco.

In December 2017, she told Bloomberg that she believed Brexit was bad for the UK economically.
