= Forward guidance =

Central bank communications on monetary policy

Forward guidance is a tool used by a central bank to exercise its power in monetary policy in order to influence, with their own forecasts, market expectations of future levels of interest rates.

Communication about the likely future course of monetary policy is known as "forward guidance". Individuals and businesses will use this information in making decisions about spending and investments. Thus, forward guidance about future policy can influence financial and economic conditions today.

The strategy can be implemented in an explicit way, expressed through communication of forecasts and future intentions, sometimes known as Odyssean forward guidance. Implied forward guidance also exists, sometimes referred to as Delphic forward guidance. It is a softer and less-binding version of forward guidance to achieve similar effects. Among the main central banks, Delphic forward guidance dominates, although there are a couple of exceptions such as the US Federal Reserve, which makes quite specific but still conditional statements, and the Bank of Japan.

== History ==
The communication policy of the Federal Reserve Bank of the United States has evolved over time. The current policy is known as "forward guidance" but this is quite recent. In fact, starting in 1994 the decisions of scheduled meetings have been announced to the public within a few minutes of 2:15 pm Eastern Time. Prior to 1994 monetary policy decisions were not announced, and investors had to indirectly infer policy actions through the size and type of open market operations in the days following each meeting. In the current context, this could be called "reverse guidance". The policy of "forward guidance" came about in the early 2000s. This has apparently resulted in a market-timing strategy, in use since 1994, "where the S&P500 index has on average increased 49 basis points in the 24 hours before scheduled FOMC announcements. These returns do not revert in subsequent trading days and are orders of magnitude larger than those outside the 24-hour pre-FOMC window. As a result, about 80% of annual realized excess stock returns since 1994 are accounted for by the pre-FOMC announcement drift". In fact, about half of the realized excess stock market returns between January 1980 and March 2011 were earned during the "pre-FOMC" window whereas there is no evidence of pre-FOMC returns before 1980. The drift is generally not dependent on either the macro economic state, market trends or action taken by the FOMC

In 2026, Prime Minister of Canada Mark Carney, who was the former governor of the Bank of Canada and Bank of England, began publishing Forward Guidance messages on YouTube to inform the public on his changes to economic policy during the trade war with the United States.

== See also ==
- Window guidance
