= List of economists =

This is an incomplete alphabetical list by surname of notable economists, experts in the social science of economics, past and present. For a history of economics, see the article History of economic thought. Only economists with biographical articles in Wikipedia are listed here.

== A ==
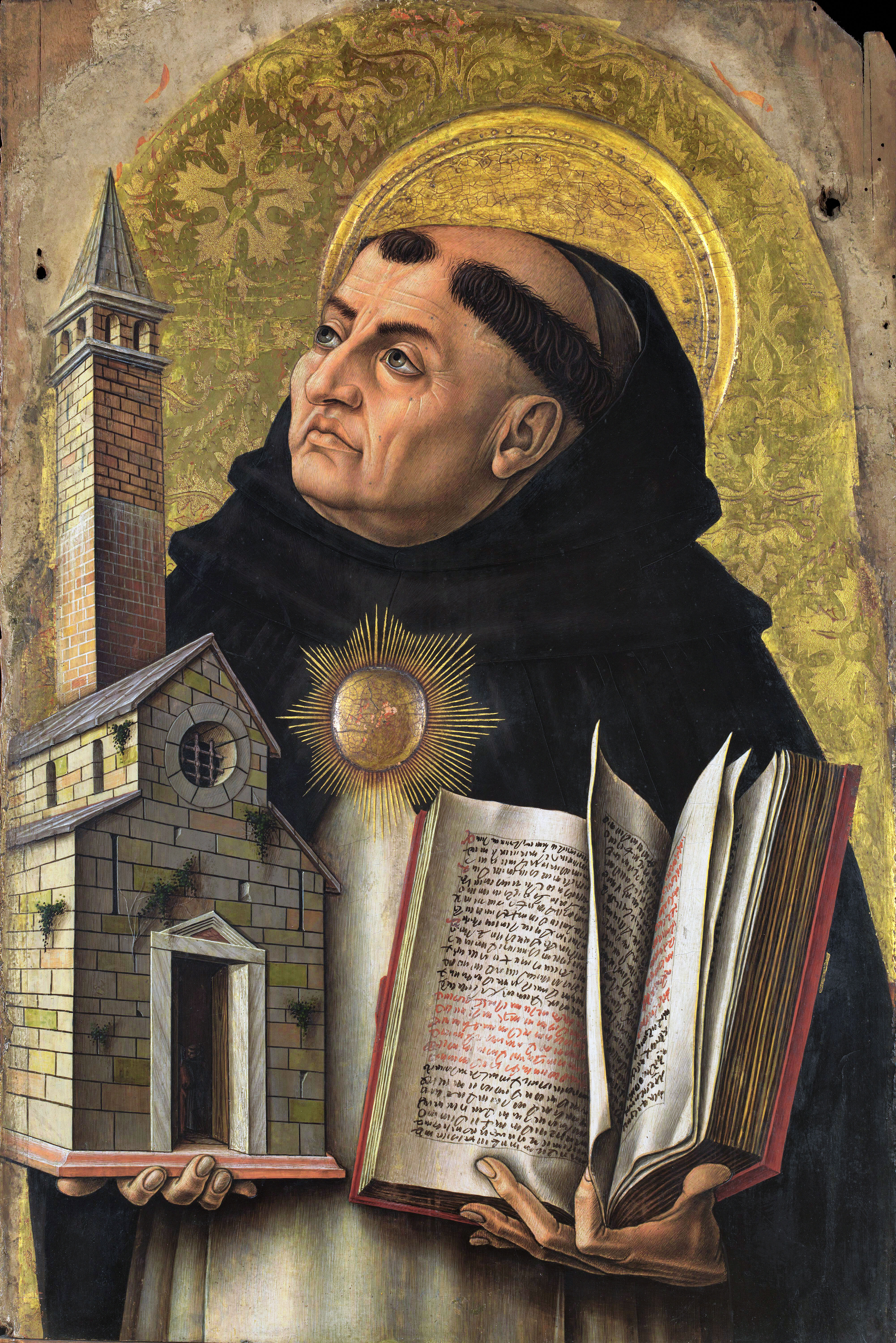
Thomas Aquinas

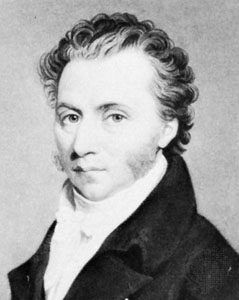
Thomas Attwood

William Ashley

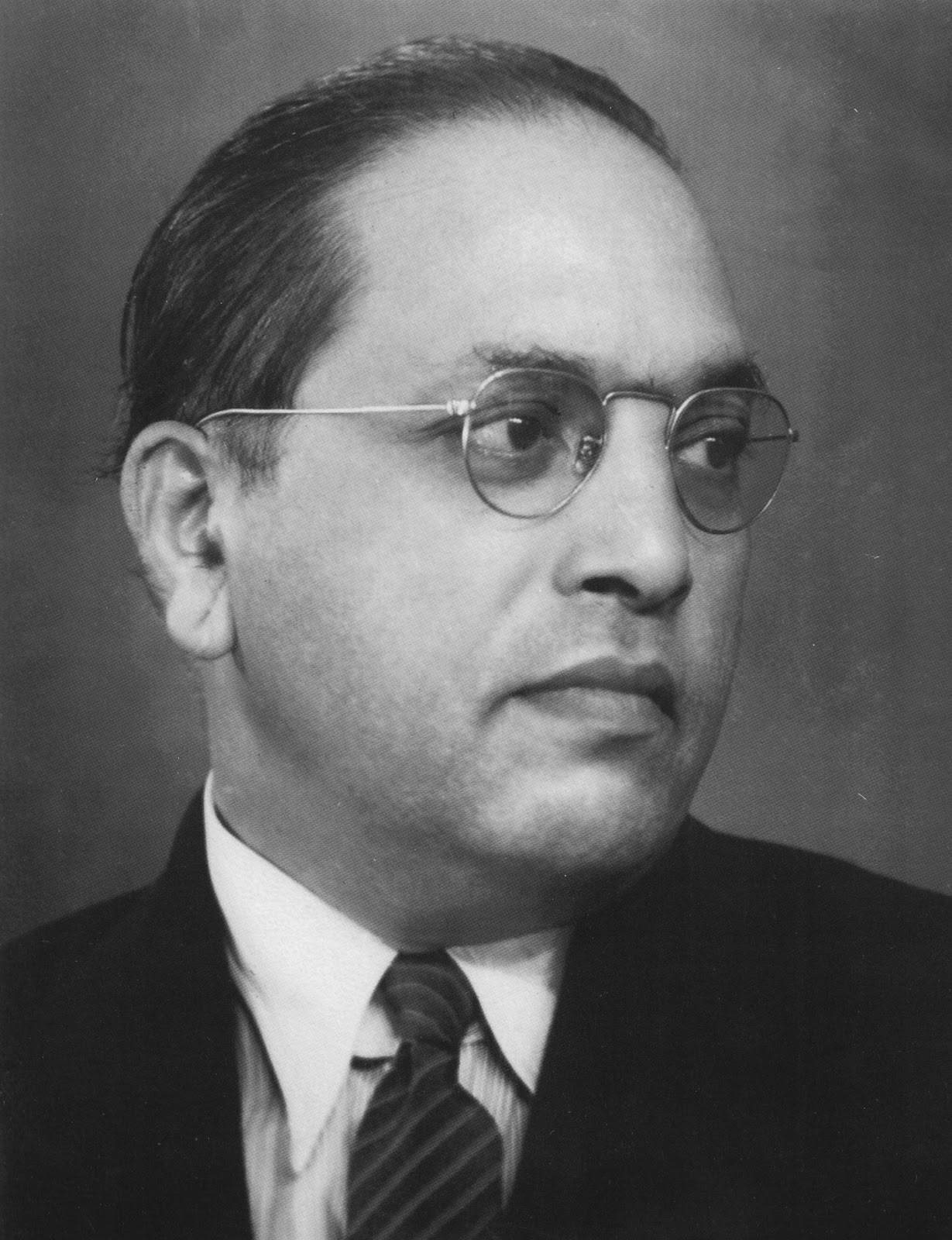
B. R. Ambedkar

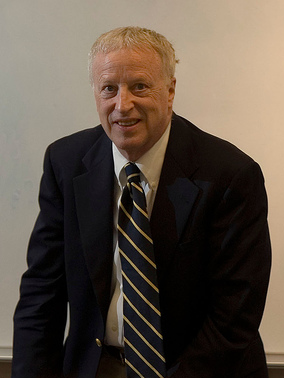
George Akerlof

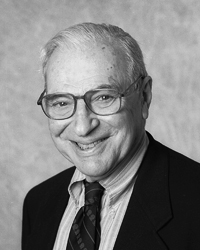
Kenneth Arrow

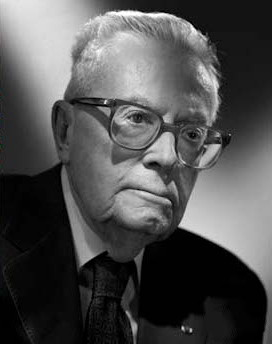
Maurice Allais

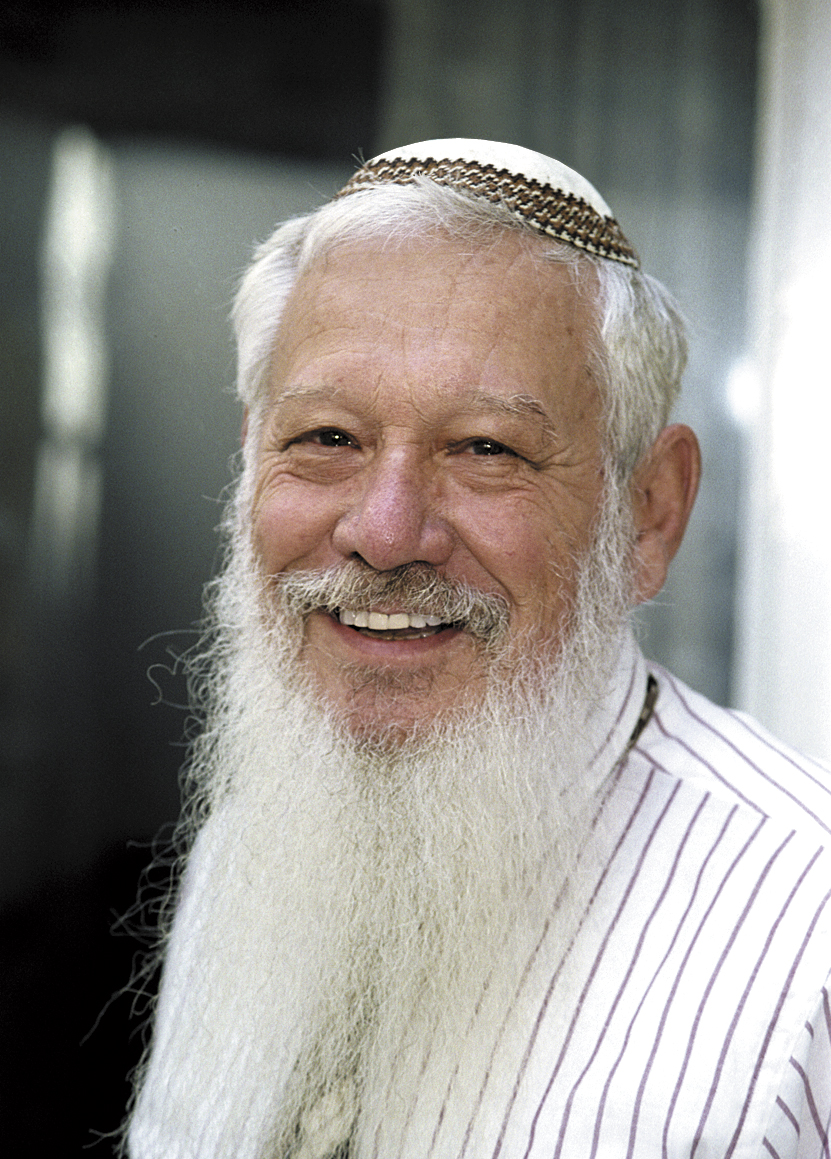
Robert Aumann

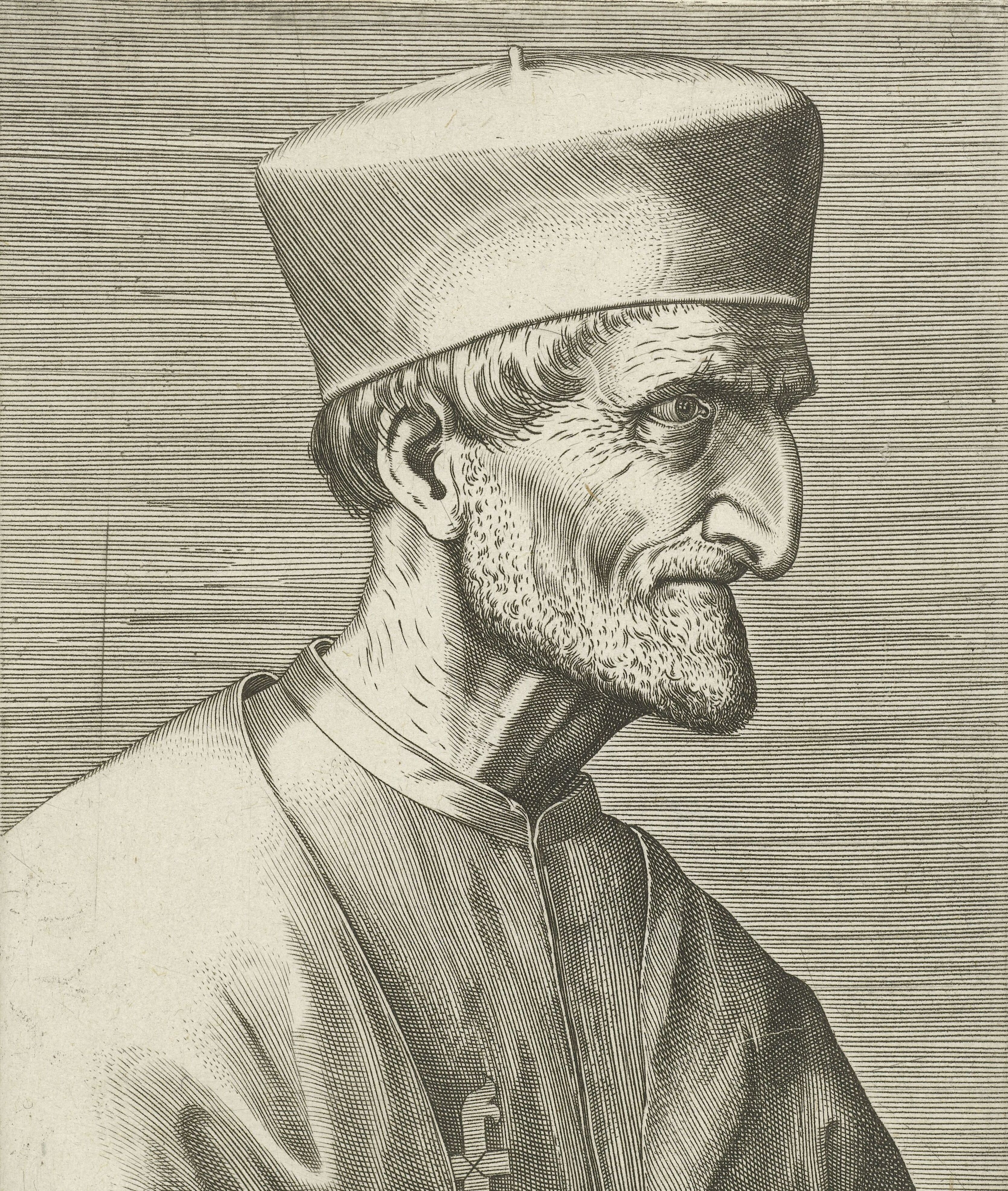
Martín de Azpilcueta
- Edith Abbott (1876–1957), American economist and social worker
- Daron Acemoglu (born 1967), Turkish/American economist
- Nicola Acocella (born 1939), Italian economist
- Zoltan Acs (born 1947), American economics professor
- Henry Carter Adams (1851–1921), American economist
- Walter Adams (1922–1998), American economist and congressional expert
- Philippe Aghion (born 1956), French economist
- Montek Singh Ahluwalia (born 1943), Indian economist
- Qazi Kholiquzzaman Ahmad (born 1943), Bangladeshi economist and environmentalist
- George Akerlof (born 1940), American economist and shared winner of the 2001 Nobel Prize in Economics
- Armen Alchian (1914–2013), American economist
- Alberto Alesina (1957–2020), Italian political economist
- Sadie Alexander (1898–1989), American lawyer and first African American to receive a PhD in economics
- Sidney S. Alexander (1916–2005), American economist
- Maurice Allais (1911–2010), French economist and 1988 winner of the Nobel Memorial Prize in Economic Sciences
- Franklin Allen (born 1956), American economist
- R. G. D. Allen (1906–1983), English economist and statistician
- Gar Alperovitz (born 1936), American political economist and historian
- Lee J. Alston (born 1951), American economist
- Elisabeth Altmann-Gottheiner (1874–1930), German economist, first woman university lecturer in Germany
- Fernando Alvarez, Argentine economist
- Jack Amariglio (born 1951), American economist
- B. R. Ambedkar (1891–1956), Indian economist and jurist
- Takeshi Amemiya (1935–2026), Japanese economist specializing in econometrics and the economy of ancient Greece
- Samir Amin (1931–2018), Egyptian economist
- Georges Anderla (1921–2005), Czechoslovak-born French economist
- W. H. Locke Anderson (1933–2002), American economist and professor
- Donald Andrews (born 1955), Canadian economist
- George-Marios Angeletos (born 1975), Greek/American economist
- Norman Angell (1872–1967), English economist and politician
- Joshua Angrist (born 1960), Israeli/American economist
- Kofi Annan (1938–2018), Ghanaian economist and Secretary-General of the United Nations
- Masahiko Aoki (青木昌彦, 1938–2015), Japanese economist
- Thomas Aquinas (1225–1274), Italian priest and writer on economics
- Luis Arce (born 1963), Bolivian economist and president
- Peter Arcidiacono (born 1971), American economist and econometrician
- Pérsio Arida (born 1952), Brazilian economist
- Dan Ariely (born 1967), Israeli/American behavioral economist
- Aristotle (384–322 BC), Ancient Greek philosopher and polymath
- Heinz Arndt (1915–2002), German-born Australian economist
- Kenneth Arrow (1921–2017), American economist, joint 1972 winner of Nobel Memorial Prize in Economics
- Gloria Macapagal Arroyo (born 1947), Philippine academic and politician
- Enrique R. Arzac (born 1943), Argentine/American economist
- Orley Ashenfelter (born 1942), American economist
- William Ashley (1860–1927), English economic historian
- Cliff Asness (born 1966), American economist and hedge-fund manager
- Jeremy Atack (born 1949), Anglo-American economic historian
- Susan Athey (born 1970), American economist
- Anthony Barnes Atkinson (1944–2017), Welsh/English economist
- Orazio Attanasio (born 1959), Italian economist
- Thomas Attwood (1783–1856), English economist
- David B. Audretsch (born 1954), American economist
- Leonardo Auernheimer (1936–2010), Argentine economist and international monetary consultant
- Robert Aumann (born 1930), Israeli/American mathematician and 2005 winner of the Nobel Memorial Prize in Economics
- David Autor (born 1967), American economist, known for work on labor economics
- George Ayittey (1945–2022), Ghanaian economist
- Clarence Ayres (1891–1972), American economist
- Martín de Azpilcueta (1492-1586), Navarrese canonist, theologian and economist

== B ==
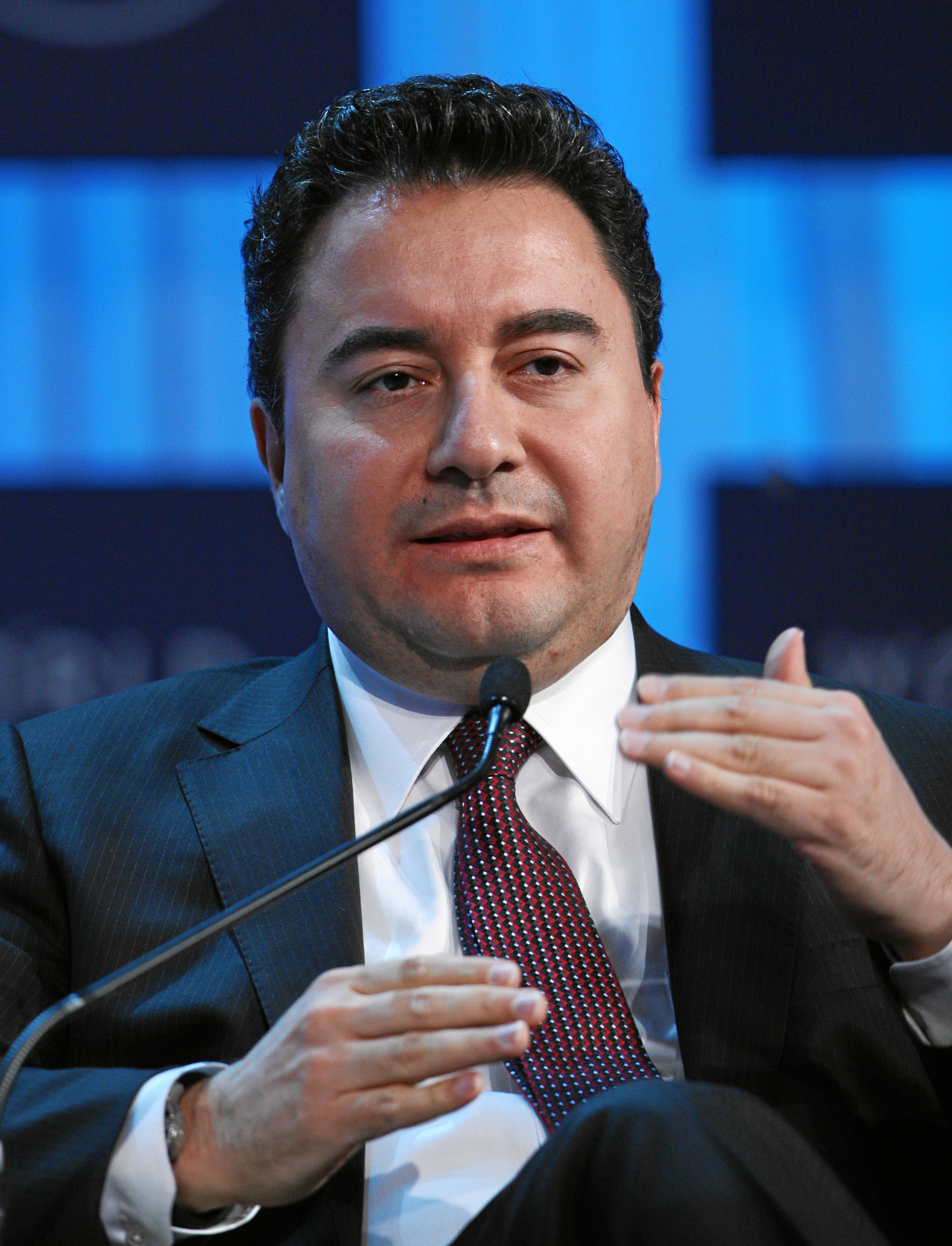
Ali Babacan

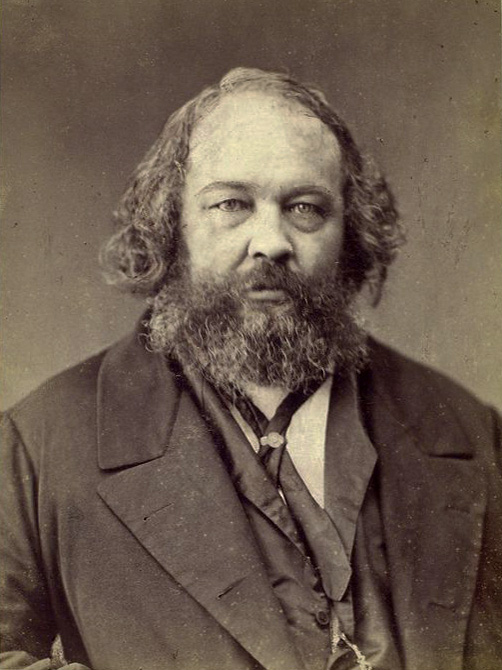
Mikhail Bakunin

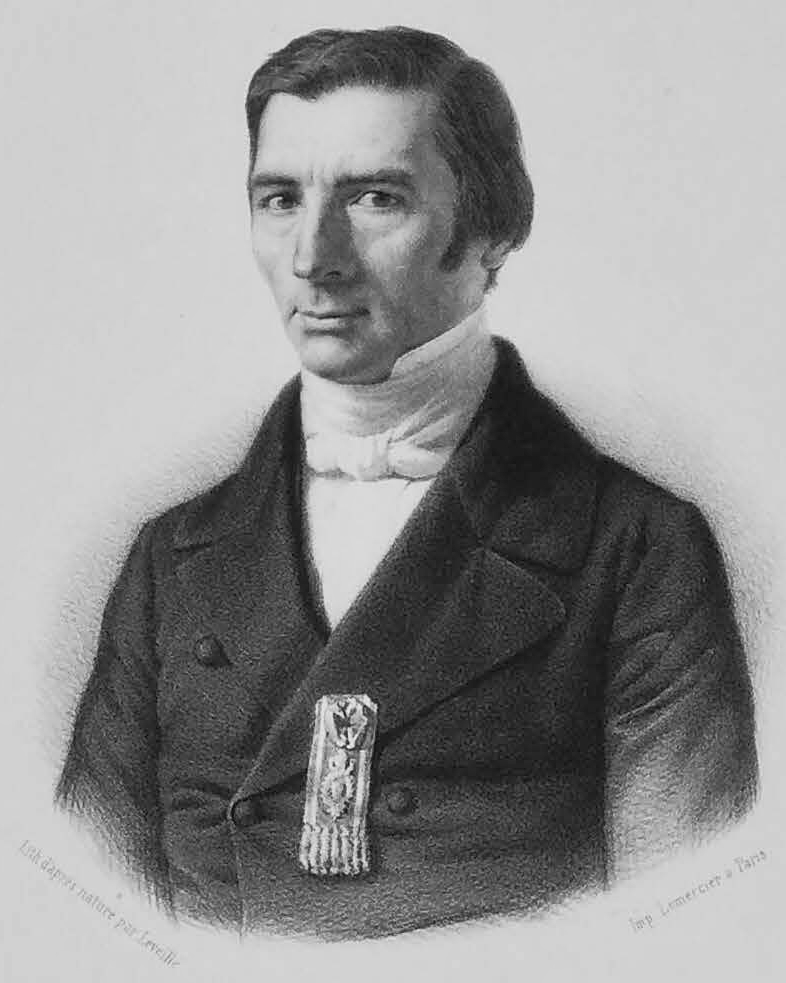
Frédéric Bastiat

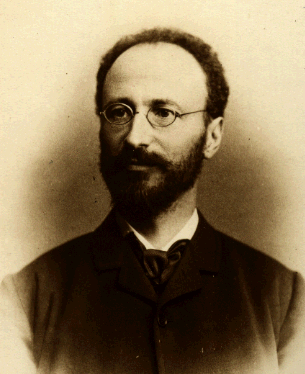
Eugen von Böhm-Bawerk

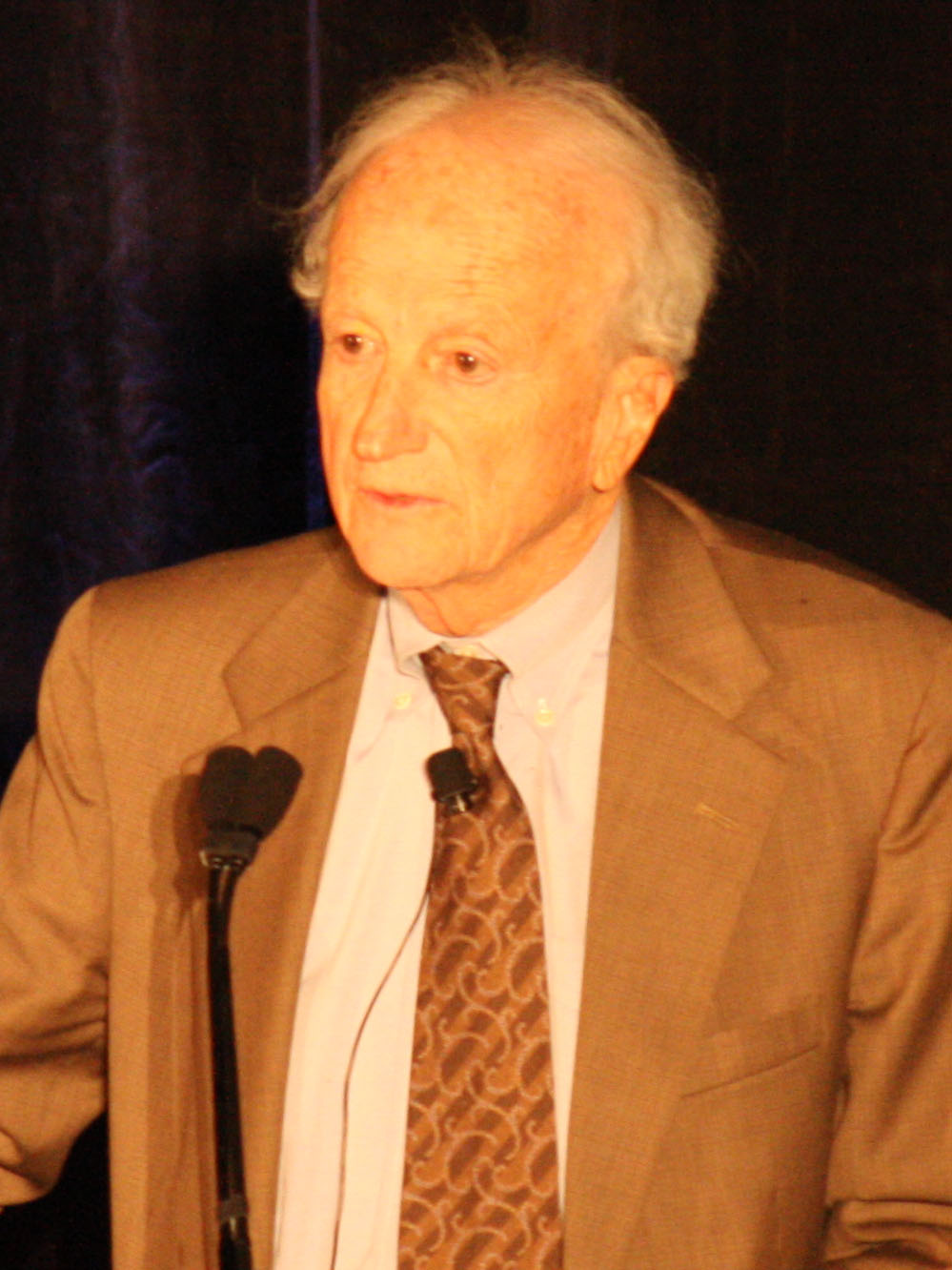
Gary Becker

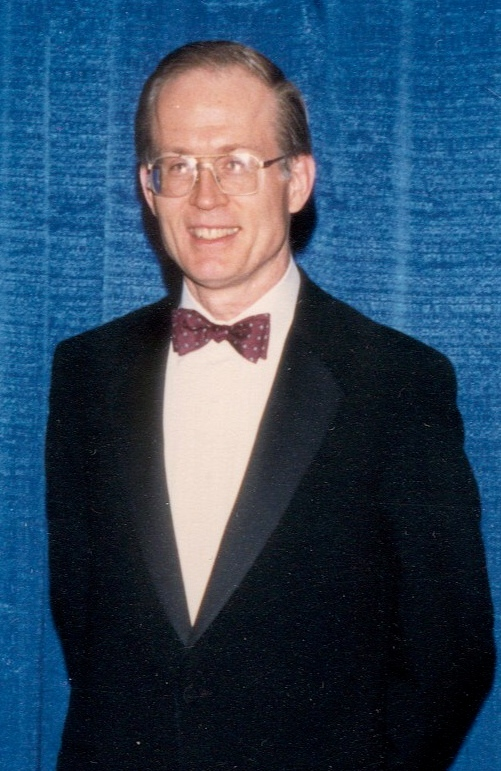
Fischer Black

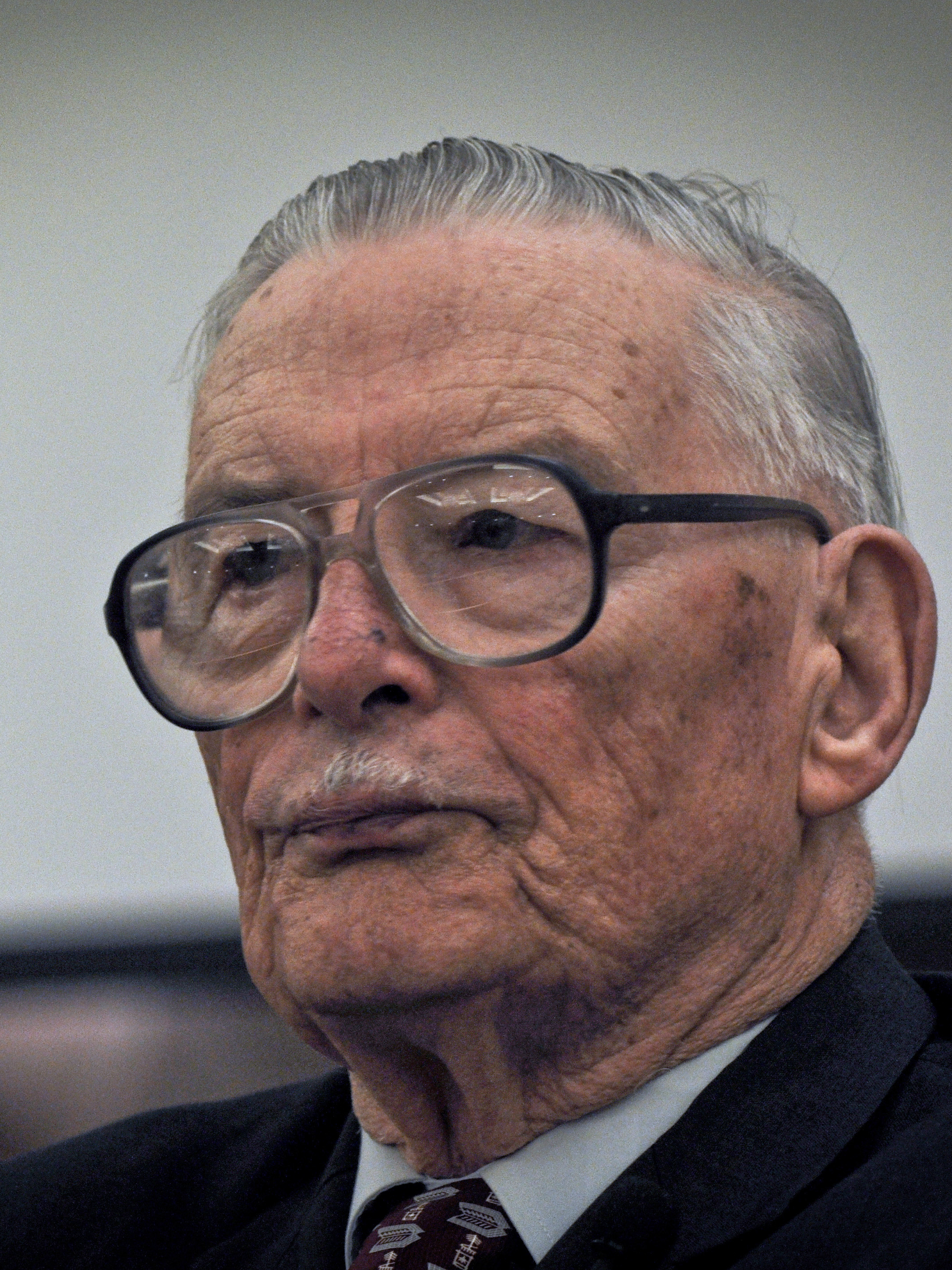
James M. Buchanan

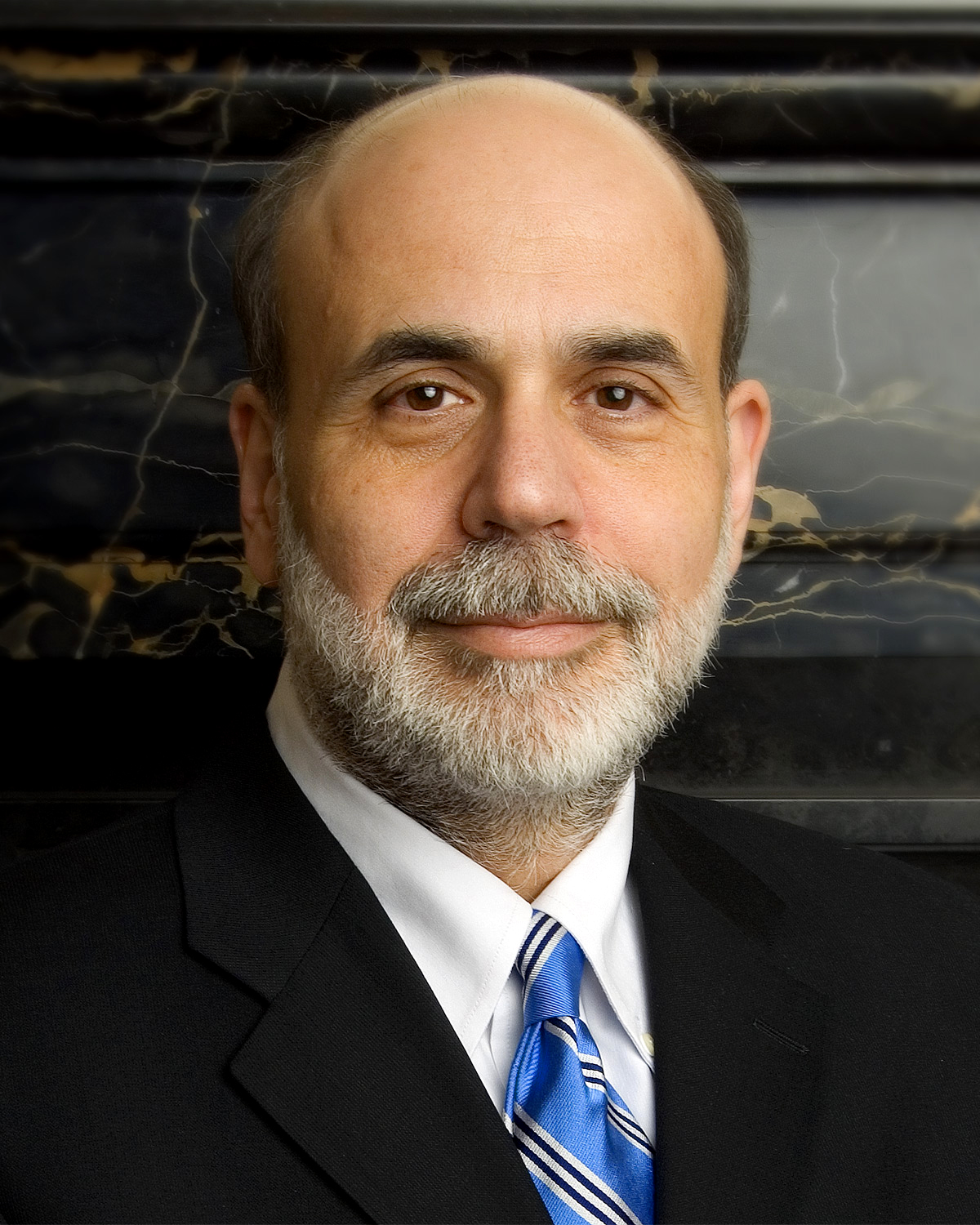
Ben Bernanke

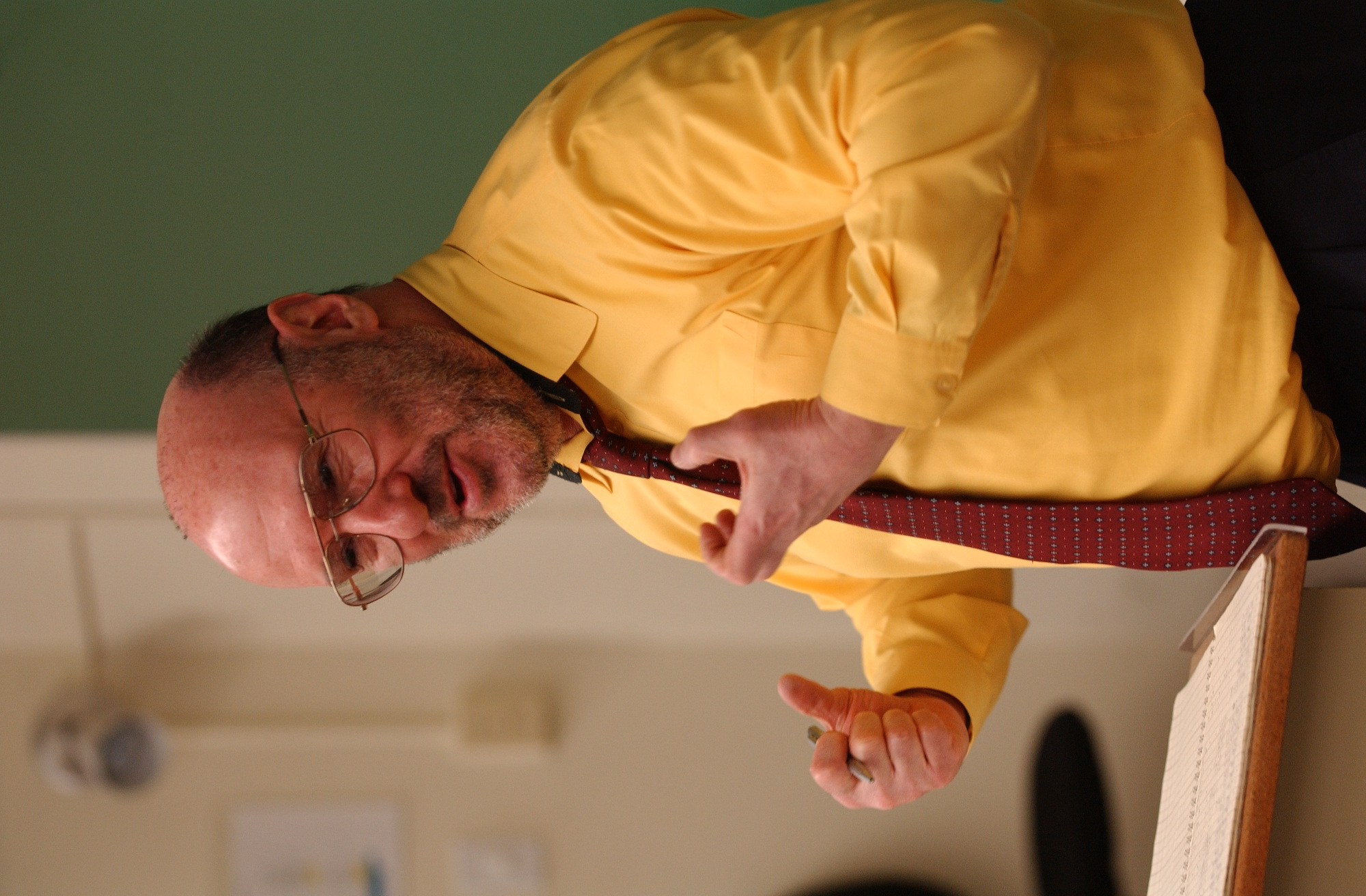
Walter Block

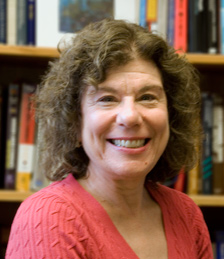
Francine D. Blau

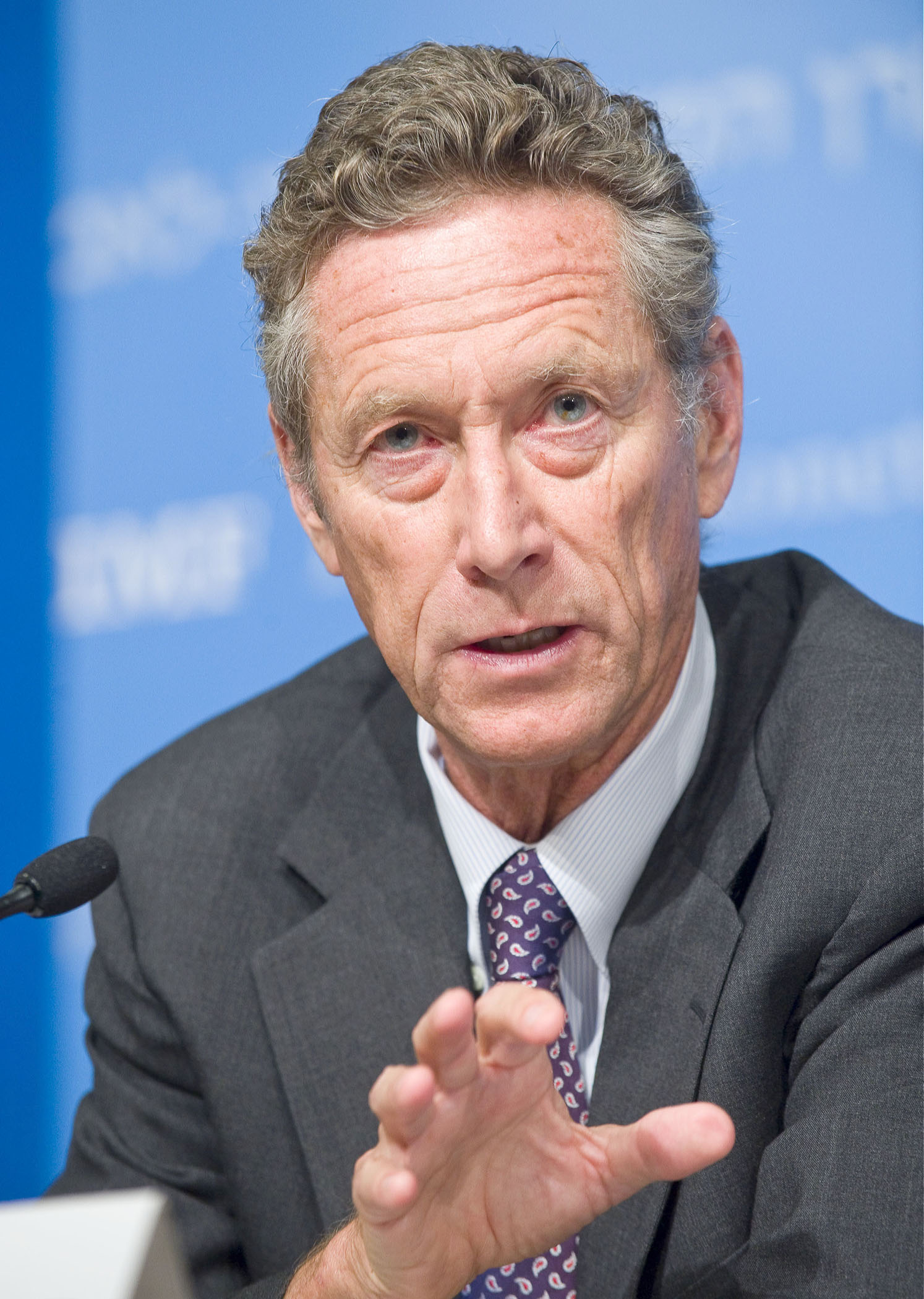
Olivier Blanchard

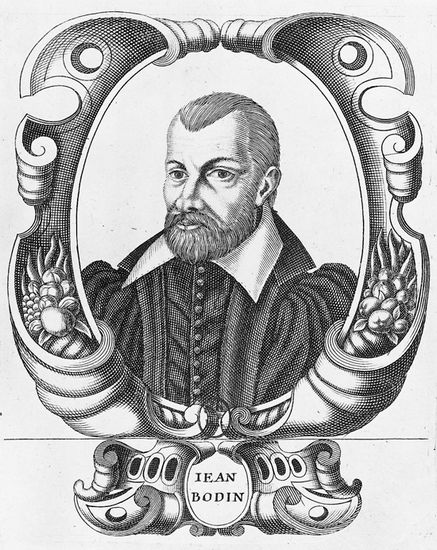
Jean Bodin

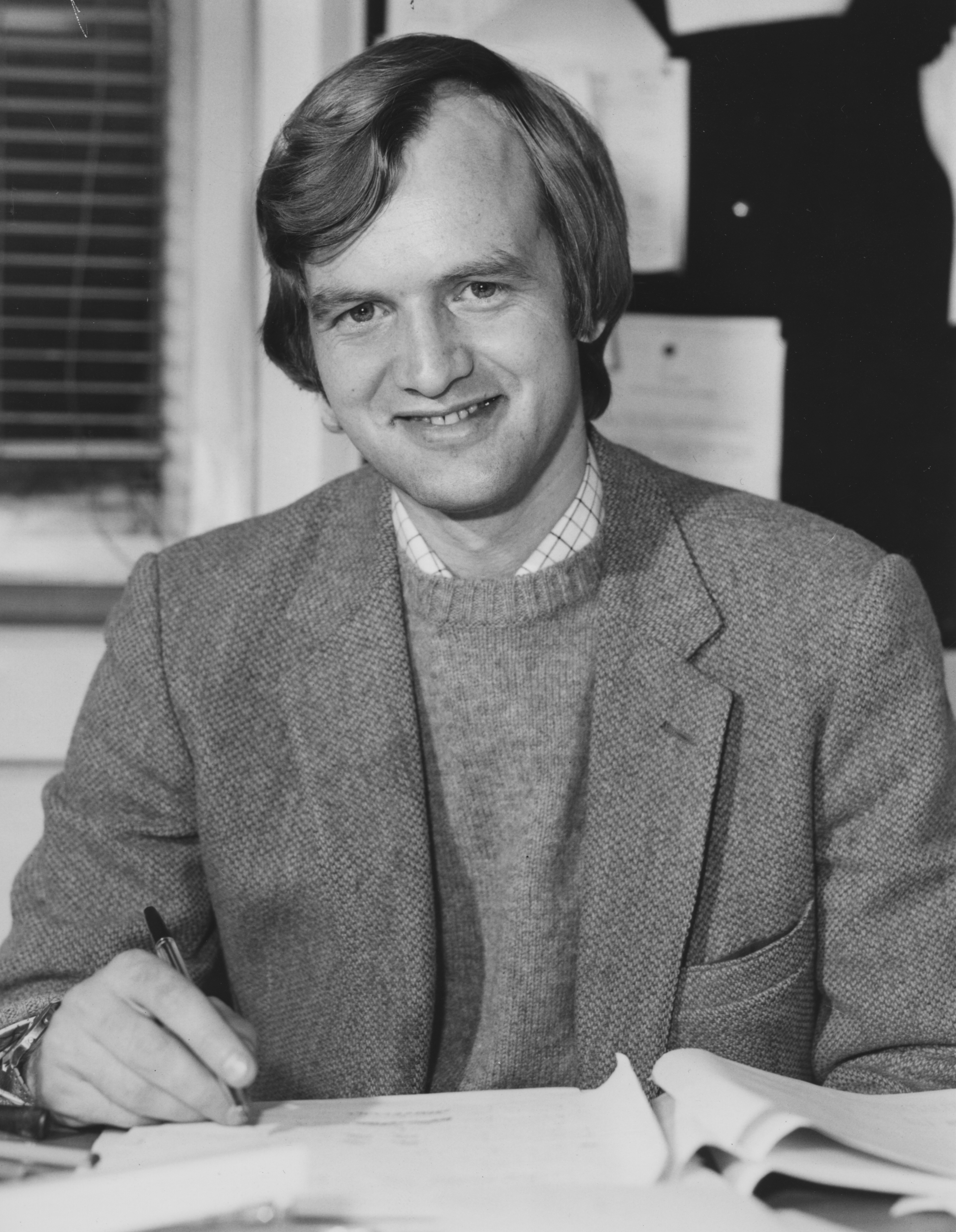
Willem Buiter

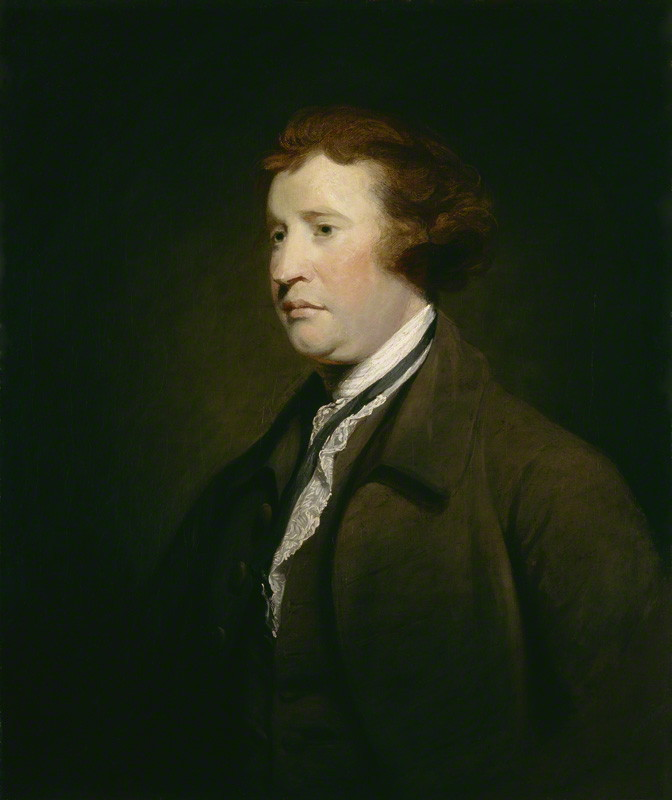
Edmund Burke
- Ali Babacan (born 1967), Turkish economic minister
- Roger Babson (1875–1967), American business theorist
- Lawrence Bacow (born 1951), American economist and university administrator
- Louis Bachelier (1870–1946), French mathematician
- Hans-Georg Backhaus (born 1929), German economist and philosopher
- Roger Backhouse (born 1951), English economist
- Walter Bagehot (1826–1877), English journalist, businessman, and essayist; wrote extensively on government, economics and literature
- Philipp Bagus (born 1980), German economist and university lecturer
- Nikolai Baibakov (1911–2008), Soviet bureaucrat, economist and Hero of Socialist Labor
- Joe S. Bain (1912–1991), American economist, founder of Industrial organization economics
- Dean Baker (born 1958), American macroeconomist and co-founder of the Center for Economic and Policy Research
- E. Wight Bakke (1903–1971), American industrial relations specialist and professor at Yale University
- Mikhail Bakunin (1814–1876), Russian revolutionary anarchist, socialist, and founder of collectivist anarchism
- Leszek Balcerowicz (born 1947), Polish economist, the former chairman of the National Bank of Poland
- Emily Greene Balch (1867–1961), American economist and peace activist (1946 Nobel Peace Prize)
- Richard Baldwin (living), American economist
- Sir James Ball (1933–2018), English econometrician, Emeritus Professor of Economics at the London Business School and a leading figure in econometric modeling
- Ludwig Bamberger (1823–1899), German economist, politician and writer
- Abhijit Banerjee (born 1961), Indian economist, Ford Foundation International Professor of Economics at the Massachusetts Institute of Technology
- Pratima Bansal (living), Canadian economist
- Paul A. Baran (1909–1964), Russian/American, the only tenured Marxist economist in the United States until his death in 1964
- Pranab Bardhan (born 1939), Indian economist, Professor Emeritus of Economics at the University of California, Berkeley
- Alexandru Bârlădeanu (1911–1997), Romanian economist and statesman
- William A. Barnett (born 1941), American economist, works in chaos, bifurcation, and nonlinearity
- Enrico Barone (1859–1924), Italian soldier, military historian, and economist
- Nicholas Barr (living), English/American economist, professor of public economics at the London School of Economics
- Raymond Barre (1924–2007), French economist and politician
- Robert Barro (born 1944), American macroeconomist, presently the Paul M. Warburg Professor of Economics at Harvard University
- Yoram Barzel (1931–2022), Israeli economist, works in property rights, applied price theory, and political economy
- Frédéric Bastiat (1801–1850), French classical liberal theorist, political economist
- Miguel Anxo Bastos (born 1967), Spanish economist
- Kaushik Basu (born 1952), Indian economist and academic, Senior Vice President and Chief Economist of the World Bank
- Ratan Lal Basu (born 1948), Indian economist
- Ravi Batra (born 1943), American economist, author and professor at Southern Methodist University in Dallas, Texas
- Peter Thomas Bauer (1915–2002), Hungarian developmental economist
- William Baumol (1922–2017), American, New York University economics professor
- Mahamudu Bawumia (born 1963), Ghanaian economist; worked at the Research Department of International Monetary Fund in Washington, D.C., United States
- Eugen von Böhm-Bawerk (1851–1914), Austrian, founder of the Austrian School of economics
- Robert Dudley Baxter (1827–1875), English economist and statistician
- Michael Baye (born 1958), American business economist
- Charlie Bean (born 1953), English economist and professor at London School of Economics
- Gary Becker (1930–2014), American economist and winner of the Nobel Memorial Prize in Economic Sciences
- Yoram Ben-Porat (died 1992), Israeli economist and president of the Hebrew University of Jerusalem
- Jeremy Bentham (1748–1832), English jurist, philosopher, and legal and social reformer
- Dwayne Benjamin (born 1961), Canadian economist, managing editor of the Canadian Journal of Economics
- Barbara Bergmann (1927–2015), American, forerunner in feminist economics with a passion for social policy and equality
- C. Fred Bergsten (born 1941), American founder of the Peterson Institute for International Economics
- Rex Bergstrom (1925–2005), New Zealand econometrician recognized for his work in continuous time econometrics
- Adolf Berle (1895–1971), American lawyer, educator, author, and US diplomat
- Ben Bernanke (born 1953), American economist, former Chairman of the United States Federal Reserve and winner of the Nobel Memorial Prize in Economic Sciences
- Jared Bernstein (1925–2005), American economist
- Marianne Bertrand (b. c. 1970), Belgian economist
- Tim Besley (born 1960), English academic economist
- Charles Bettelheim (1913–2006), French economist and historian
- William Beveridge (1879–1963), English economist and politician
- Truman Bewley (born 1941), American mathematician and economist
- Jagdish Bhagwati (born 1934), Indian economist and professor of economics and law at Columbia University
- Debapriya Bhattacharya (living), Bangladeshi economist and policy analyst
- Mark Bils (born 1958), macroeconomist at the University of Rochester
- Nancy Birdsall (born 1946), American founding president of the Center for Global Development
- Kenneth Binmore (born 1940), English economist and game theorist, professor emeritus of economics at University College, London
- Mette Koefoed Bjørnsen (1920–2008), Danish economist at the Niels Brock Copenhagen Business College
- William K. Black (born 1951), American professor of economics at UMKC
- Fischer Black (1938–1995), American economist, best known as one author of the famous Black–Scholes equation
- William Blake (1774–1852), English classical economist
- Olivier Blanchard (born 1948), French, chief economist at the International Monetary Fund
- Rebecca Blank (born 1955), American economist and politician
- Francine D. Blau (born 1946), American economist and academic
- Knut Blind (born 1965), German innovation economist
- Alan Blinder (born 1945), American economist, serves at Princeton University
- Walter Block (born 1941), American free market economist and anarcho-capitalist
- Barry Bluestone (born 1944), American economist and academic
- John Blundell (1952–2014), English economist
- Richard Blundell (born 1952), English economist and econometrician
- Jean Bodin (1530–1596), French, early proponent of the Quantity Theory of Money
- Tito Boeri (born 1958), Italian economist, professor of economics at Bocconi University, Milan
- Peter J. Boettke (born 1960), American economist of the Austrian School
- Michele Boldrin (born 1956), Italian-American economist, expert in economic growth
- Tim Bollerslev (born 1958), Danish economist
- Matilde Bombardini (living), Italian Canadian economist in Vancouver
- Murray Bookchin (1921–2006), American political philosopher
- Korkut Boratav (born 1935), Turkish, marxist economist
- George Borjas (born 1950), American, Harvard Kennedy School
- Michael Boskin (born 1945), American, T. M. Friedman Professor of Economics and senior fellow at Stanford University's Hoover Institution
- Giovanni Botero (c. 1544–1617), Italian thinker, priest, poet, and diplomat
- O. Fred Boucke (1881–1935), American economist
- Kenneth E. Boulding (1910–1993), American economist, educator, peace activist, poet, religious mystic, devoted Quaker
- Heather Boushey (born 1970), senior economist with the Center for US Progress
- Samuel Bowles (born 1939), American Professor Emeritus at the University of Massachusetts Amherst
- David Boyle (born 1958), English historian and economist
- William Brainard (b. c. 1935), American economist
- James Brander (born 1953), Canadian economist
- Avishay Braverman (born 1948), Israeli president of the Ben-Gurion University of the Negev
- Harry Braverman (1920–1976), American socialist, economist and political writer
- John Francis Bray (1809–1897), American radical, Chartist, writer on socialist economics
- Richard A. Brealey (living), English economist and corporate finance expert
- William Breit (1933–2011), American professor of economics at Trinity University, San Antonio, Texas
- Robert Brenner (born 1943), American economic historian
- George Ignatius Brizan (1942–2012), economics lecturer and later Prime Minister of Grenada
- Sophie Brochu (born 1963), Canadian economist
- Martin Browning (born 1946), English economist, professor of economics at the University of Oxford
- Sylvie Brunel (born 1960), French economist
- Markus Brunnermeier (born 1969), German/American economist
- Michael Bruno (1932–1996), Israeli economist, governor of the Bank of Israel, World Bank Chief Economist
- Erik Brynjolfsson (born 1962), American economist known for work on productivity and the economics of AI
- James M. Buchanan (1919–2013), American economist known for work on public choice theory, received the Swedish central bankers' "Nobel" prize in 1986
- Alan Budd (born 1937), English economist and central banker
- Willem Buiter (born 1949), Dutch economist
- Sergei Bulgakov (1871–1944), Russian Orthodox theologian, philosopher and economist
- Edmund Burke (1729–1797), Irish statesman, economist, and philosopher, known for writing A Vindication of Natural Society
- Paul Burkett (1956–2024), American economist, educator and musician

== C ==
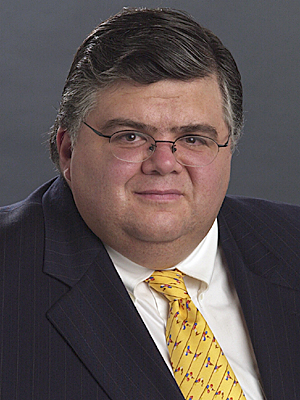
Agustín Carstens

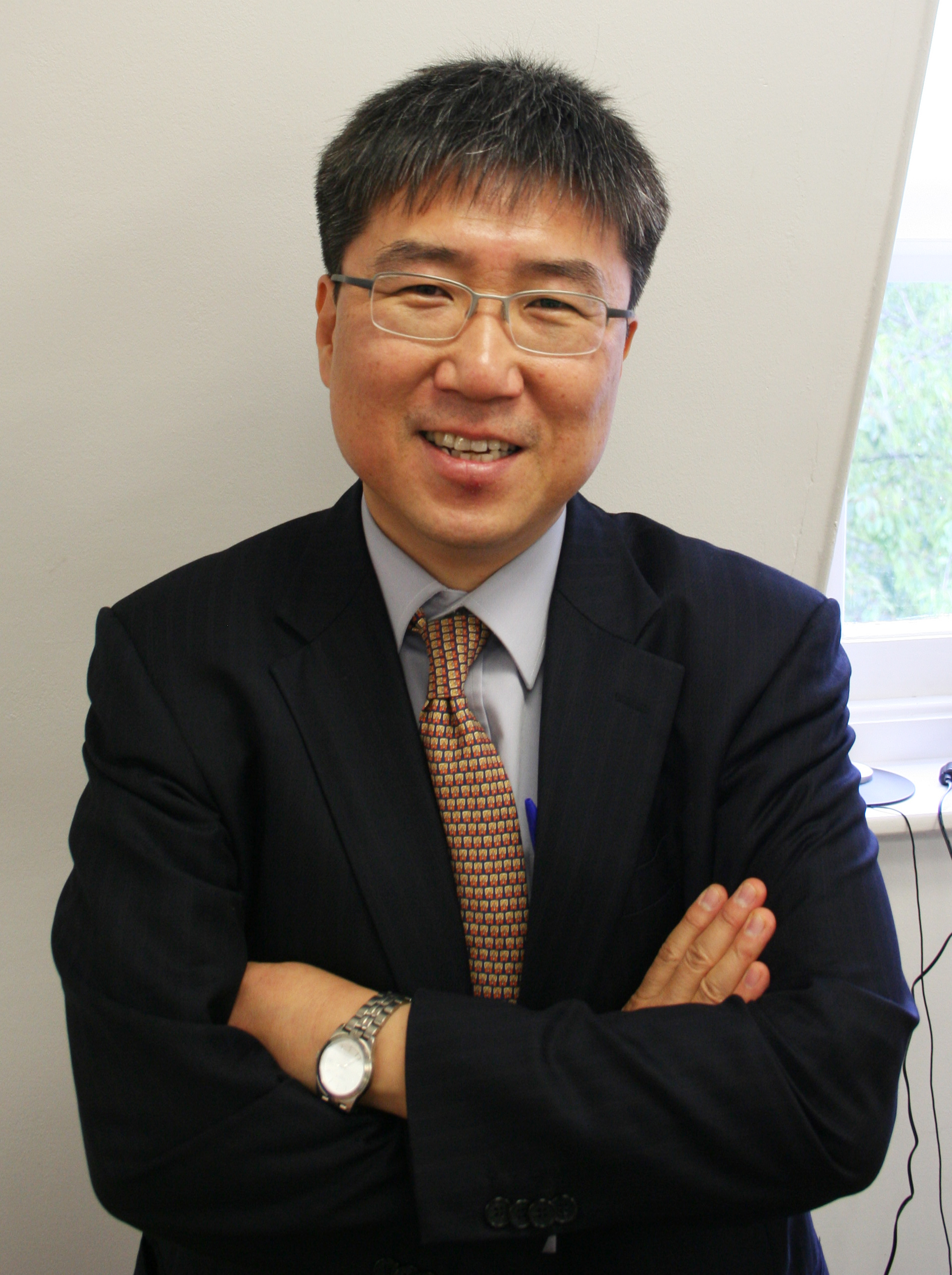
Ha-Joon Chang

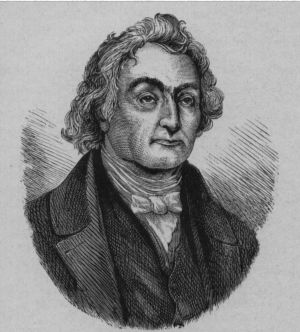
Thomas Chalmers

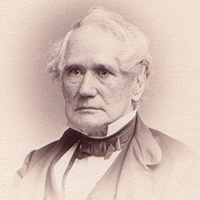
Henry Charles Carey

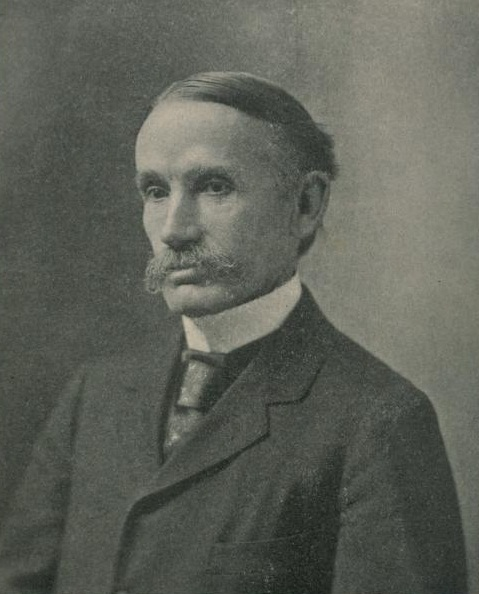
John Bates Clark

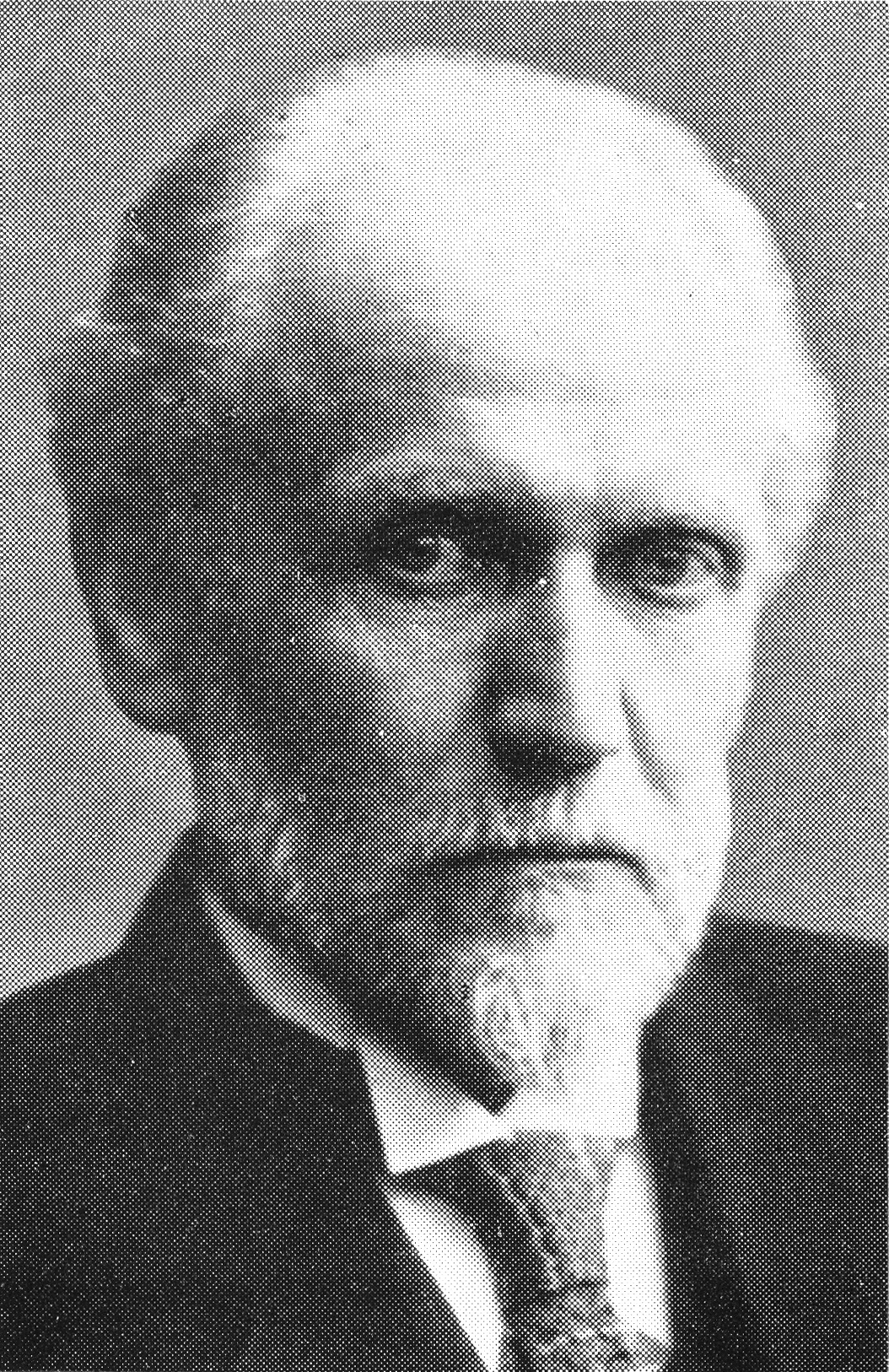
Gustav Cassel

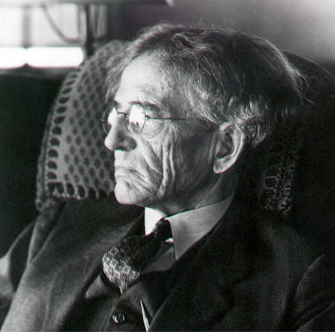
John R. Commons
- Ricardo J. Caballero (born 1959), Chilean macroeconomist, holds the Ford International chair of economics at MIT
- Vince Cable (born 1943), English economist
- Federico Caffè (1914–1987), Italian, economist and Professor of Economic and Financial Policy at "Sapienza" University of Rome, Rome
- Phillip D. Cagan (1927–2012), American scholar and author, Professor of Economics Emeritus at Columbia University
- John Elliot Cairnes (1823–1875), Ireland, "last of the classical economists"
- Guillermo Calvo (born 1941), Argentine economist
- John Y. Campbell (born 1958), British/American economist, chairman of the Harvard economics department
- Colin Camerer (born 1959), American economist
- Lisa Cameron (born 1967), Australian, Professional Research Fellow at the Melbourne Institute of Applied Economic and Social Research
- Stephen Cameron (b. c. 1960), American financial analyst, economist and Adjunct Associate Professor of International and Public Affairs at Columbia University
- Richard Cantillon (c. 1680–1734), Irish-French, economist and author of Essay on the Nature of Trade in General
- Edwin Cannan (1861–1935), English economist and historian of economic thought
- Bryan Caplan (born 1971), American professor of economics at George Mason University in Fairfax, Virginia
- Luis Caputo (born 1965), Argentinian economist and politician
- David Card (born 1956), Canadian labor economist and professor at the University of California, Berkeley
- Matias D. Cattaneo (born 1978), Argentine economist and professor at Princeton University
- Henry Charles Carey (1793–1879), American economist of the American School of Capitalism
- Mark Carney (born 1965), Canadian economist, governor of the Bank of England, Prime Minister of Canada since March 2025
- Kevin Carson (born 1963), American social and political theorist and scholar of political economy writing in the mutualist and individualist anarchist traditions
- Richard Carson (born 1955), American environmental economist
- Agustín Carstens (born 1958), Mexican economist, governor of the Bank of Mexico
- Anne P. Carter (born 1925), American economist, professor at Brandeis University
- David Cass (1937–2008), American professor of economics at the University of Pennsylvania
- Gustav Cassel (1866–1945), Swedish economist and professor of economics at Stockholm University
- Attilio Celant (born 1942), Italian economist, Dean of the Faculty of Economics (2002–2011) and Professor of Economic Geography at "Sapienza" University of Rome, Rome
- Seweryn Chajtman (1919–2012), Polish scientist, engineer, teacher of the Industrial Management, creator of the Alternative Theory of Organization and Management
- Thomas Chalmers (1780–1847), Scottish mathematician, political economist and a leader of the Free Church of Scotland
- Frank J. Chaloupka (b. c. 1962), American professor of economics at the University of Illinois at Chicago and affiliate of the National Bureau of Economic Research
- Edward Hastings Chamberlin (1899–1967), American economist
- Neil W. Chamberlain (1915–2006), American economist at Yale University and Columbia University most known for work in industrial relations
- Alfred D. Chandler, Jr. (1918–2007), American professor of business history at Harvard Business School and Johns Hopkins University
- Ha-Joon Chang (born 1963), Korean, one of the leading heterodox economists and institutional economists specialising in development economics
- V. V. Chari (born 1952), Indian/American economist
- François Chesnais (1934–2022), French economist
- Raj Chetty (born 1979), Indian/American economist
- Steven N. S. Cheung (born 1935), Chinese economist specializing in transaction costs and property rights
- Ajay Chhibber (living), Indian economist and politician
- Graciela Chichilnisky (born 1946), Argentine/American mathematical economist
- Victoria Chick (born 1936)
- Josiah Child (1630–1699), English mercantilist, politician and governor of the East India Company
- Menzie Chinn (born 1961)
- Lawrence J. Christiano (born 1952), American economist
- Anders Chydenius (1729-1803) Swedish-Finnish lutheran priest and economist
- Richard Clarida (born 1957)
- Colin Clark (1905–1989), British/Australian economist, pioneered the use of the gross national product (GNP)
- Gregory Clark (born 1957), American economic historian at the University of California, Davis
- John Bates Clark (1847–1938), American neoclassical marginalist
- John Maurice Clark (1884–1963), American marginalist
- William D. Clark (1916–1985), English economist and public servant
- Harry Cleaver (born 1944), American economist, scholar and professor
- Michael Clemens (born 1972), American economist
- Ronald Coase (1910–2013), winner of the Swedish central bankers' "Nobel" prize in 1991, for contributions including transaction costs and Coase theorem
- Warren Coats (born 1942), American economist specializing in monetary policy
- John H. Cochrane (born 1957), American financial economist and macroeconomist
- Paul Cockshott (born 1952), Scottish economist and computer scientist
- Luc Coene (1947–2017), Belgian economist, governor of the National Bank of Belgium
- Jean-Baptiste Colbert (1619–1683), French King Louis XIV's Minister of Finances, known for protectionism and dirigisme
- Paul Collier
- John R. Commons (1862–1945), American institutional economist and labor historian
- Auguste Comte (1798–1857), French philosopher, founder of sociology and positivism
- Marquis de Condorcet (1743–1794), French enlightenment philosopher, mathematician, and early political scientist known for the Condorcet method of voting
- Tim Congdon (born 1951), English economist and euro-sceptic politician
- Alfred Haskell Conrad (1924–1970), American Harvard professor of economics
- Victor Prosper Considerant (1808–1893), French economist and utopian socialist philosopher
- Hugh E. Conway (born 1942), American economist and professor at the Industrial College of the Armed Forces
- Thomas F. Cooley (1943–2021), American economist
- Richard N. Cooper (1934–2020), American economist and policy adviser
- Russell W. Cooper (born 1955), American macroeconomist
- Antoine Augustin Cournot (1801–1877), French philosopher and mathematician, influenced the use of mathematics in economics, known for oligopoly theory, Cournot competition is named for him
- Nicolaus Copernicus (1473–1543), Polish mathematician and economist
- Carol Corrado (living), American economist
- Dora L. Costa (born 1964), American economist and academic
- Edmilson Costa (born 1950), Brazilian professor of economics
- Christopher Coyne (born 1977), F. A. Harper professor of Economics at the Mercatus Center, George Mason University
- Tyler Cowen (born 1962), American economist and writer, one of the authors of the Marginal Revolution blog
- Vincent Crawford (born 1950), American economist and game theorist
- August Friedrich Wilhelm Crome (1753–1833), German economist and statistician, known particularly for his Producten-Karte von Europa (1782), one of the first uses of cartograms
- James Crotty (born 1940), American macroeconomist
- Raymond Crotty (1925–1994), Irish economist and campaigner against Irish membership of the European Union; his 1987 successful legal challenge in the Irish Supreme Court is the basis for EU treaty changes having to be submitted to referendum in Ireland
- Benoit Crutzen (born 1972), Belgian economist and assistant university professor
- Jakša Cvitanić (born 1962), Croatian/American economist, professor at Caltech

== D ==
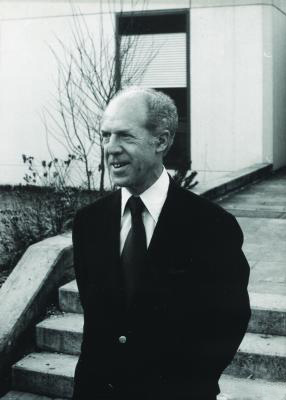
Gérard Debreu

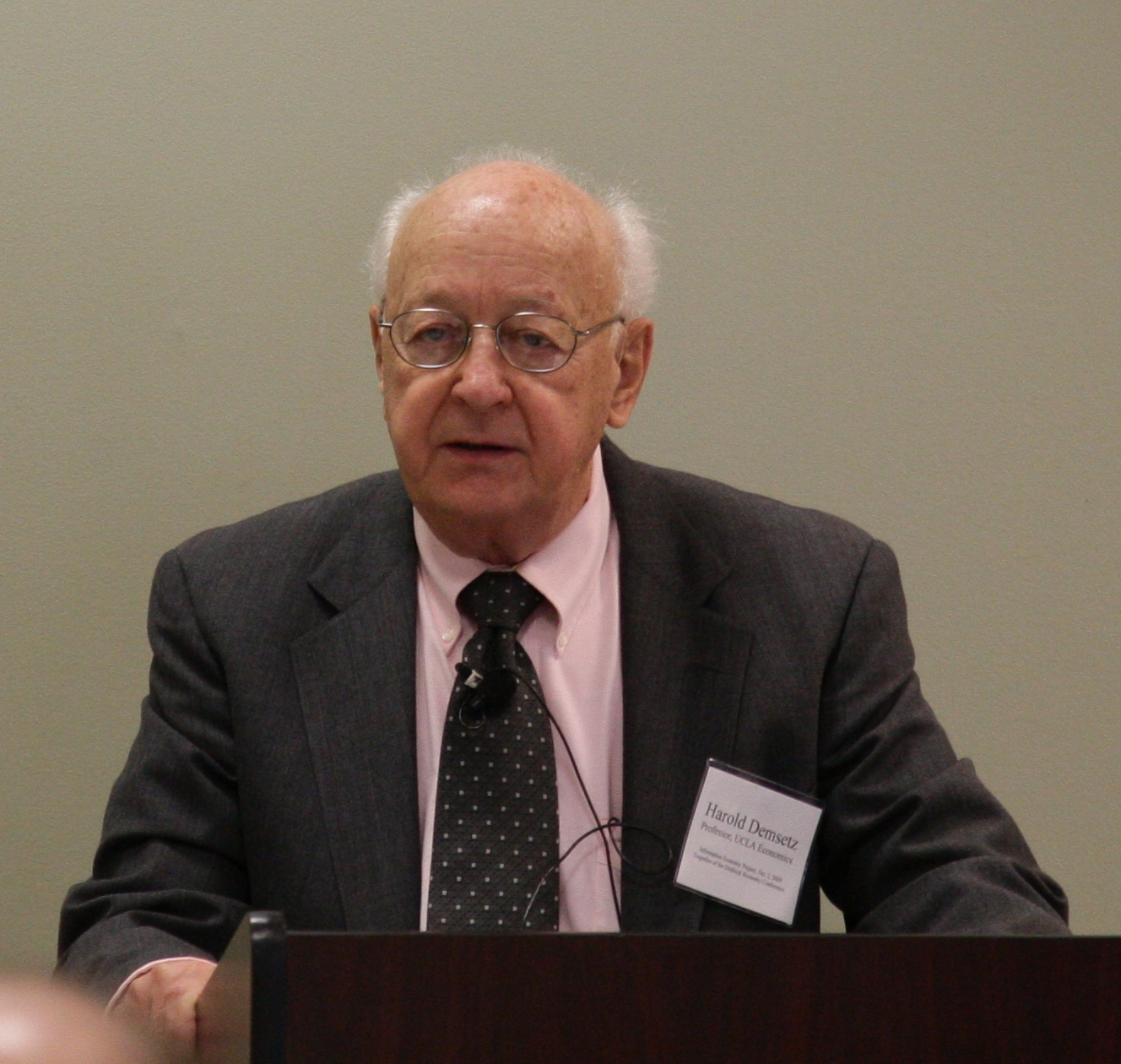
Harold Demsetz

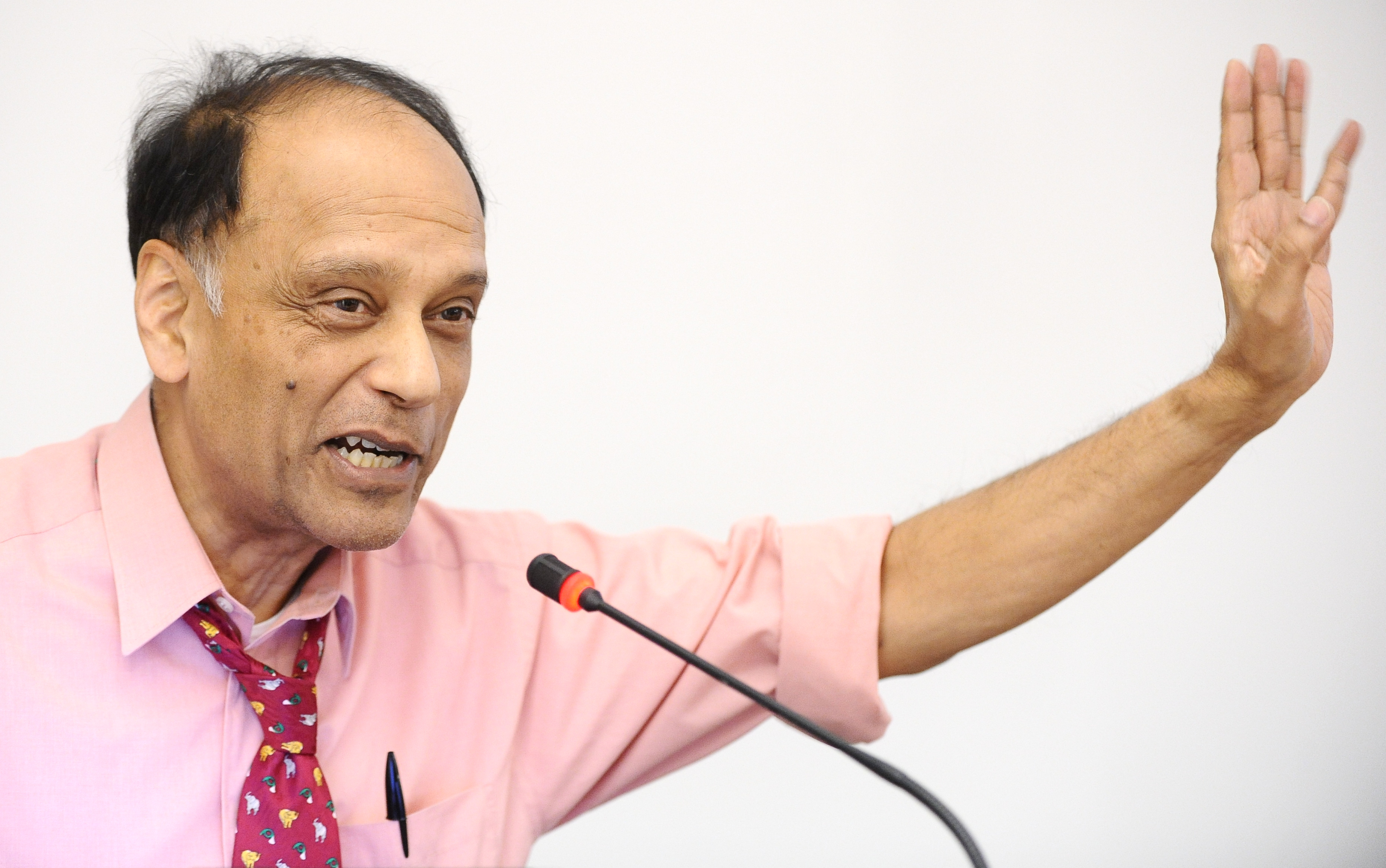
Partha Dasgupta

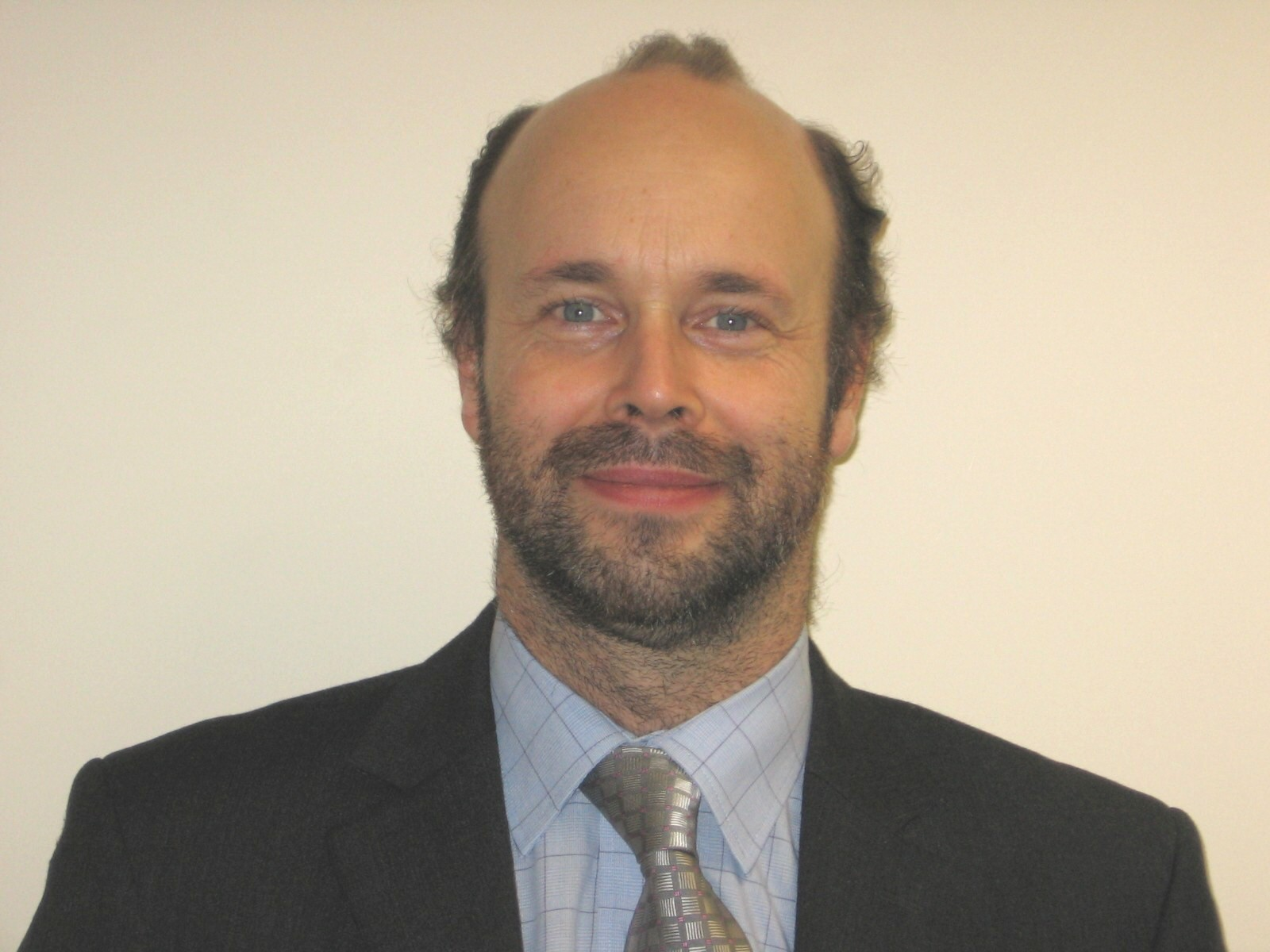
Huw Dixon

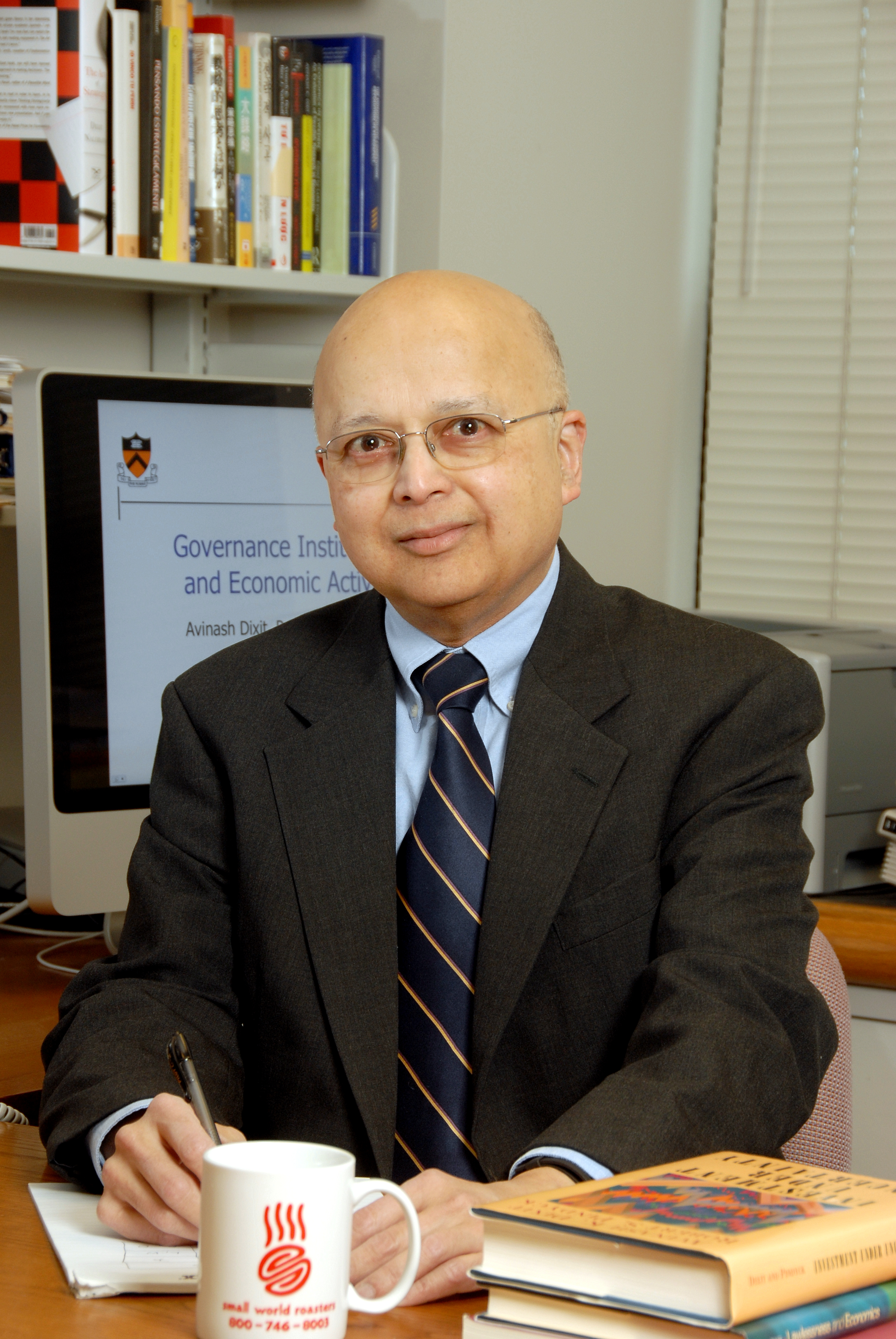
Avinash Dixit

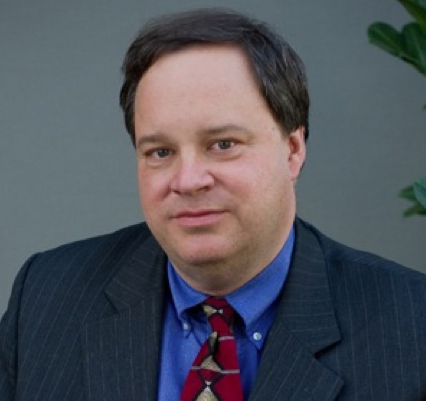
J. Bradford DeLong
- Uri Dadush (living), French scholar in Washington DC
- Hugh Dalton (1887–1962), Welsh/English economist and politician
- Herman Daly (born 1938), American "father" of ecological economics
- George Dantzig (1914–2005), American mathematical scientist
- William A. "Sandy" Darity Jr. (born 1953), American economist and researcher
- Biplab Dasgupta (1938–2005), Indian economist
- Partha Dasgupta (born 1942), Bangladeshi/British development economist
- Charles Davenant (1656–1714), English mercantilist and politician
- Paul Davidson (born 1930), American macroeconomist
- Antony Davies (born 1965), American economist and author
- D. J. Davies (1893–1956), Welsh economist and author
- Lance E. Davis (1928–2014), American social science professor
- Angus Deaton (born 1945), Scottish-American economist and academic
- Gérard Debreu (1921–2004), French-American economist and mathematician
- Rajeev Dehejia (born 1973), American professor of public policy
- J. Bradford DeLong (born 1960), American economic historian
- Harold Demsetz (1930–2019), American professor of economics
- Isaac de Pinto (1717–1787), Dutch banker and scholar
- Meghnad Desai, Baron Desai (born 1940), Indian/British economist and Labour Party politician
- Hernando de Soto Polar (born 1941), Peruvian economist of the informal economy
- Pat Devine (living), English industrial economist
- Mathias Dewatripont (born 1959), Belgian economist and professor
- Armando Di Filippo (living), Argentine economist and academic
- Douglas Diamond (born 1953), American finance expert
- Peter Diamond (born 1940), American social security expert
- Gladys Dickason (1903–1971), American labor economist
- Peter Dicken (born 1938), English economic geographer
- Benjamin Diokno (born 1948), Philippine central banker
- Avinash Dixit (born 1944), Indian/American economist
- Huw Dixon (born 1958), Welsh economist and academic
- Peter Dixon (born 1946), Australian economist and academic
- Simeon Djankov (born 1970), Bulgarian economist and politician
- Maurice Dobb (1900–1976), English Marxist economist
- David Dodd (1895–1988), American financial analyst
- Randall Dodd (living), American policy regulator
- Jennifer Doleac (living), American economist
- Evsey Domar (1914–1997), Soviet/American economist
- Paul Donovan (born 1972), British economist
- Stephen J. Dubner (born 1963), American economics author and broadcaster
- Henda Ducados (born 1964), French/Angolan economist
- Esther Duflo (born 1972), French/American economist
- Steven N. Durlauf (born 1958), American economist and social scientist
- Philip H. Dybvig (born 1955), American economist and professor at Olin Business School

== E ==
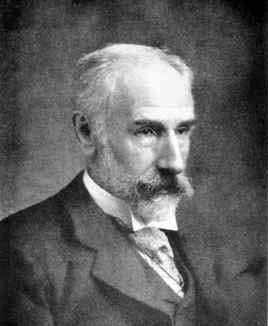
Francis Ysidro Edgeworth

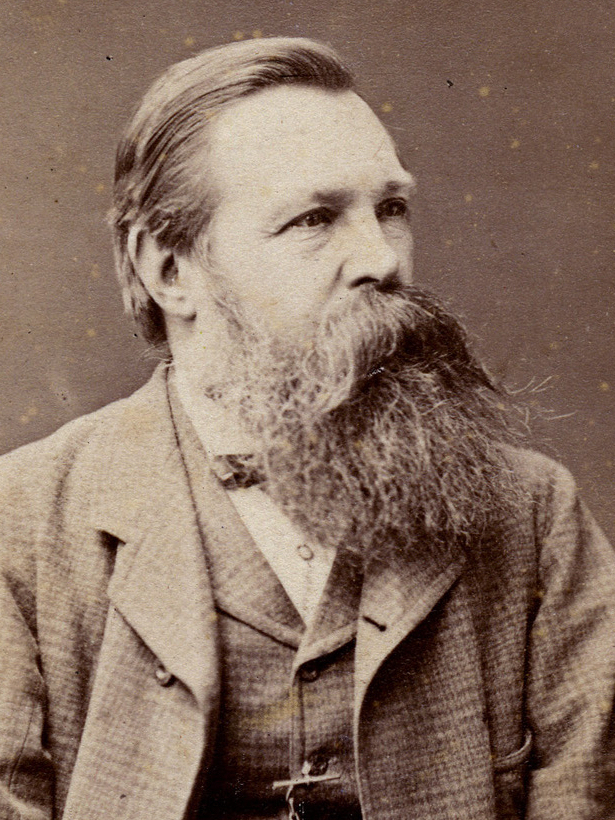
Friedrich Engels

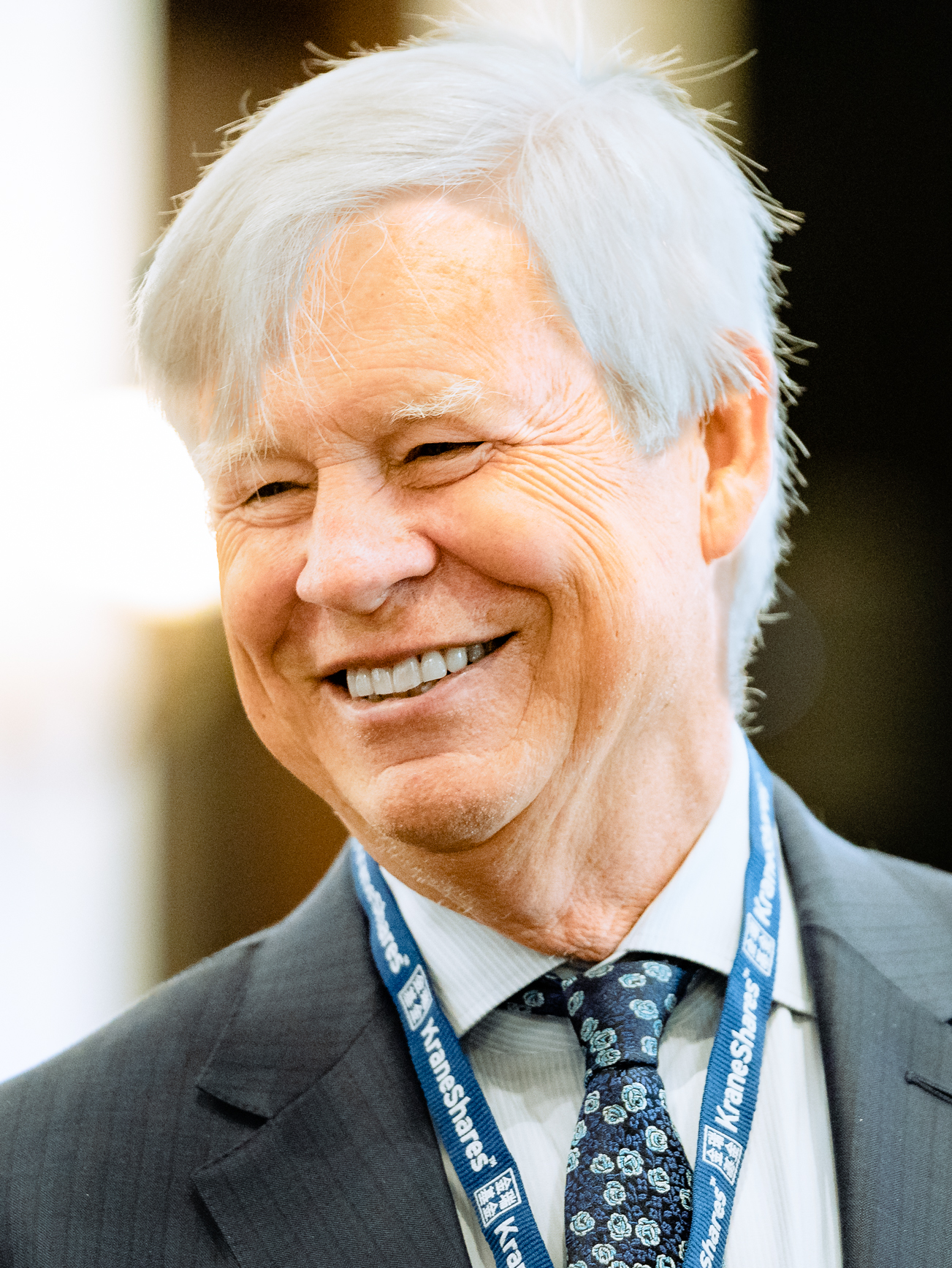
Robert F. Engle

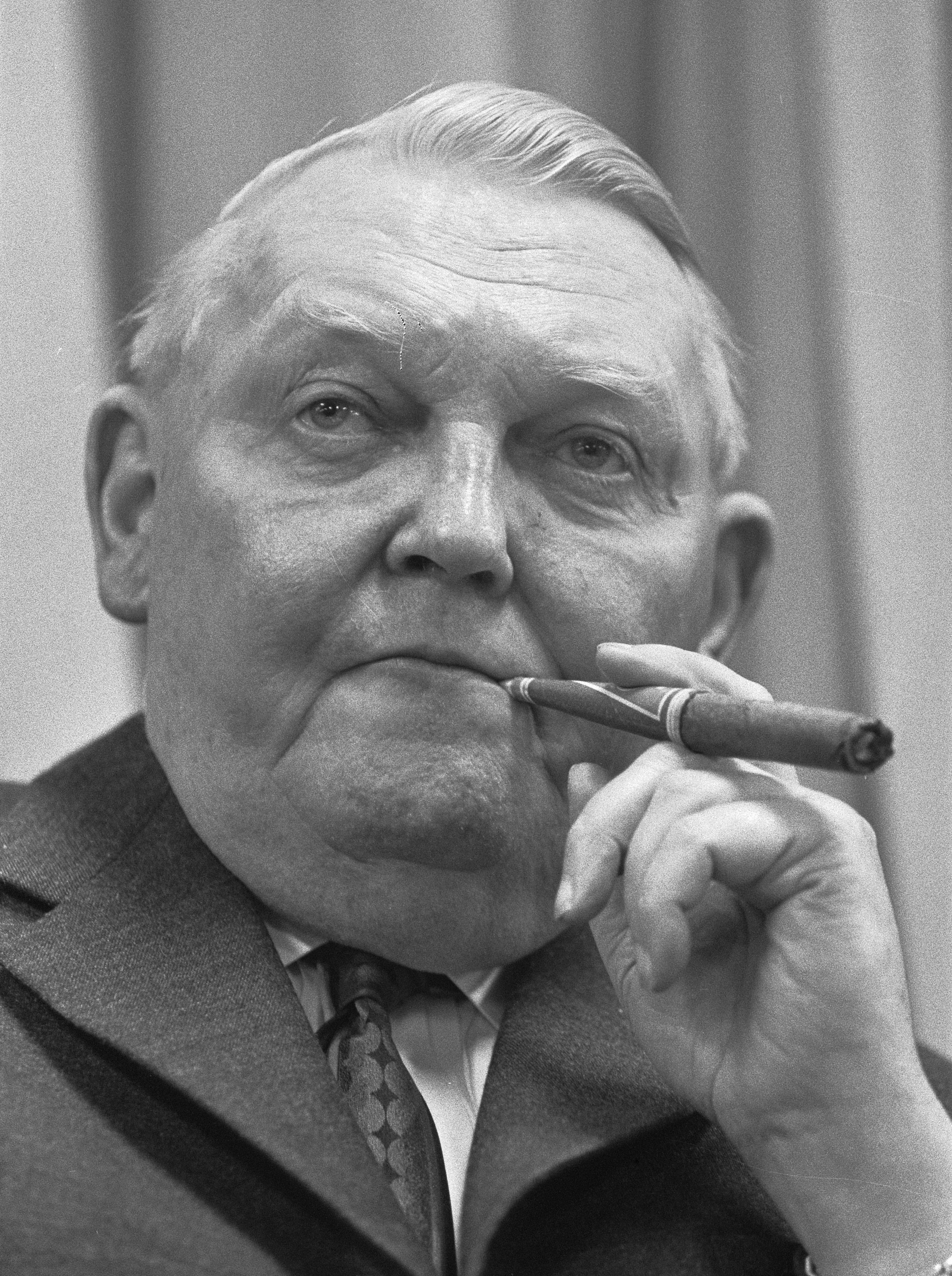
Ludwig Erhard

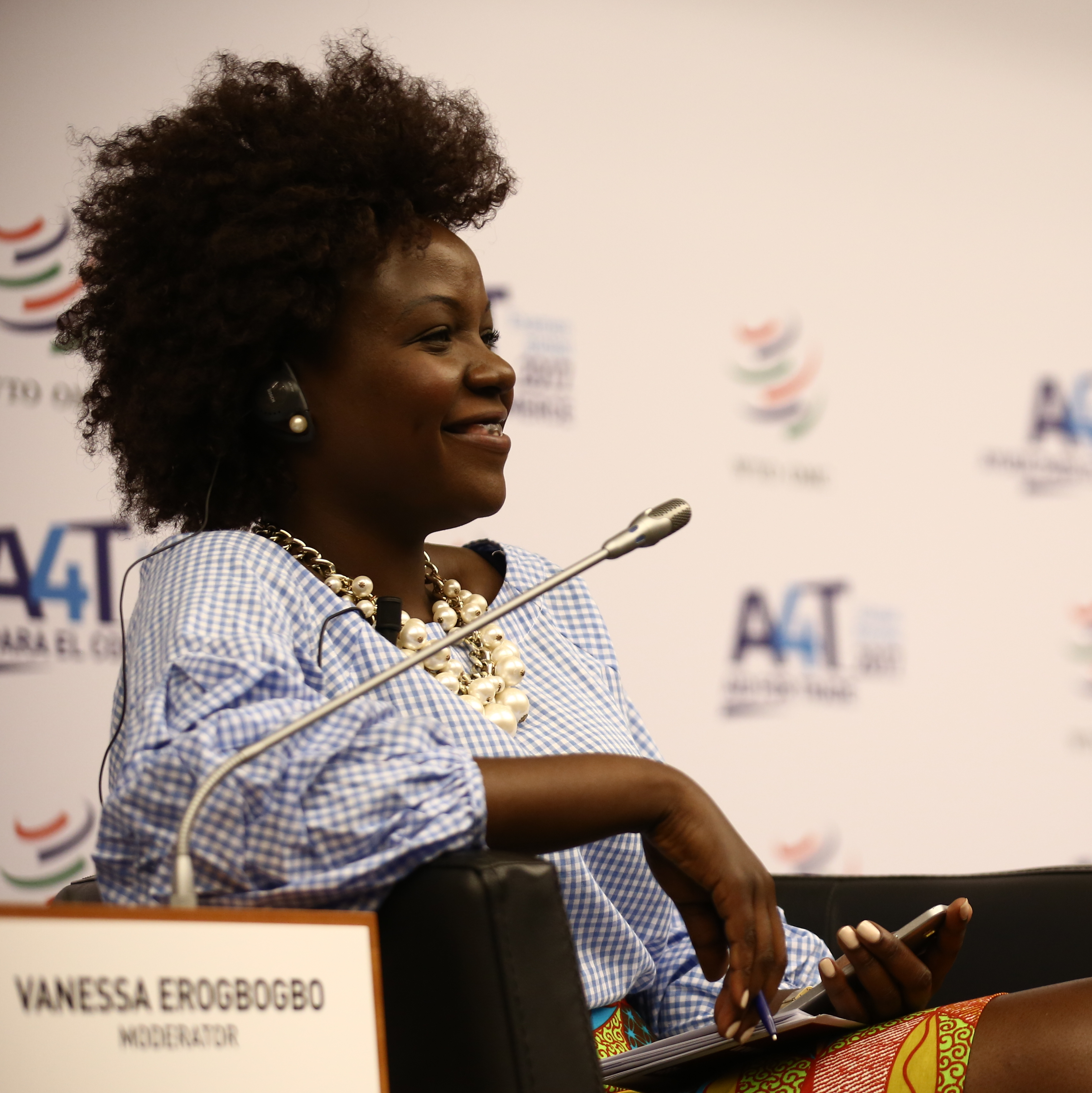
Vanessa Erogbogbo
- Shlomo Eckstein (1929–2020), Israeli economist and academic
- Nicholas Economides, Greek economist
- Francis Ysidro Edgeworth (1845–1926), Anglo-Irish philosopher and political economist
- Sebastian Edwards (born 1953), Chilean economist and academic
- Martin Eichenbaum (born 1954), American professor of economics
- Barry Eichengreen (born 1952), American economist and political scientist
- Alfred Eichner (1937–1988), American economist
- Ali M. El-Agraa (born 1941), Sudanese/British economist
- Daniel Ellsberg (1931–2023), American economist and politician
- Richard T. Ely (1853–1943), American economist and social interventionist
- Kenneth G. Elzinga (living), American economist and writer
- Ernst Engel (1821–1896), German economist and statistician
- Friedrich Engels (1820–1895), German/British Marxist economist
- Stanley Engerman (born 1936), American economist and economic historian
- Robert F. Engle (born 1942), American statistician and economist
- Ludwig Erhard (1897–1977), German economist and politician
- Vanessa Erogbogbo (living), Ugandan/British development specialist
- Saul Eslake, Australian economist and commentator
- José Luís Espert (born 1961), Argentinian economist and politician
- Miren Etxezarreta (born 1936), Basque economist

== F ==
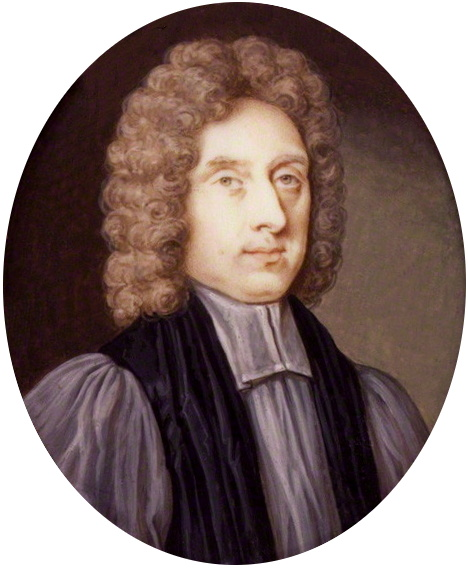
William Fleetwood

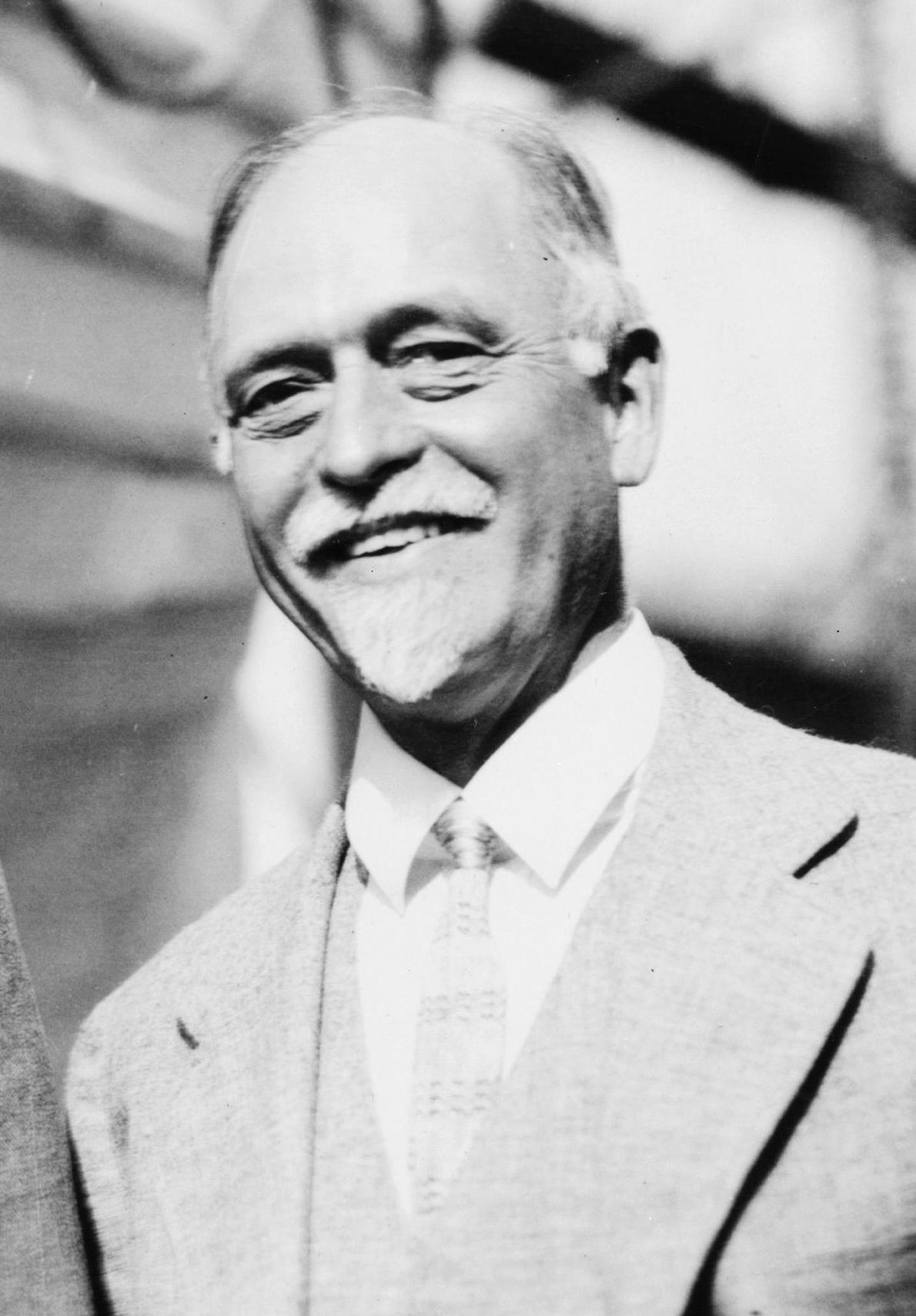
Irving Fisher

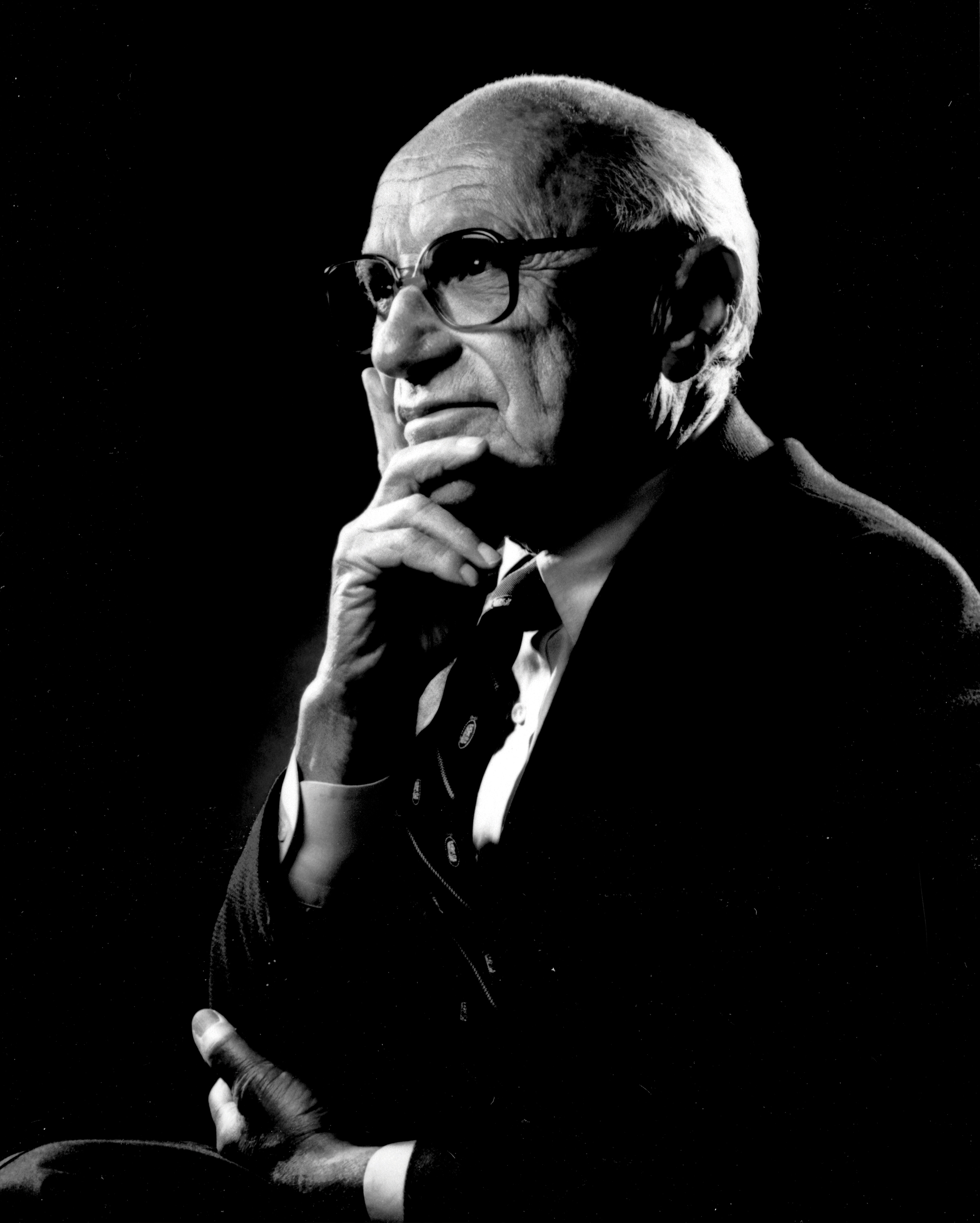
Milton Friedman

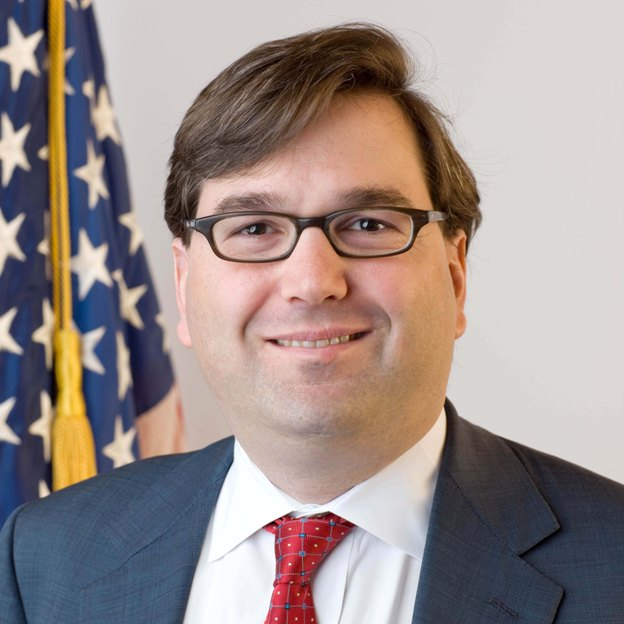
Jason Furman

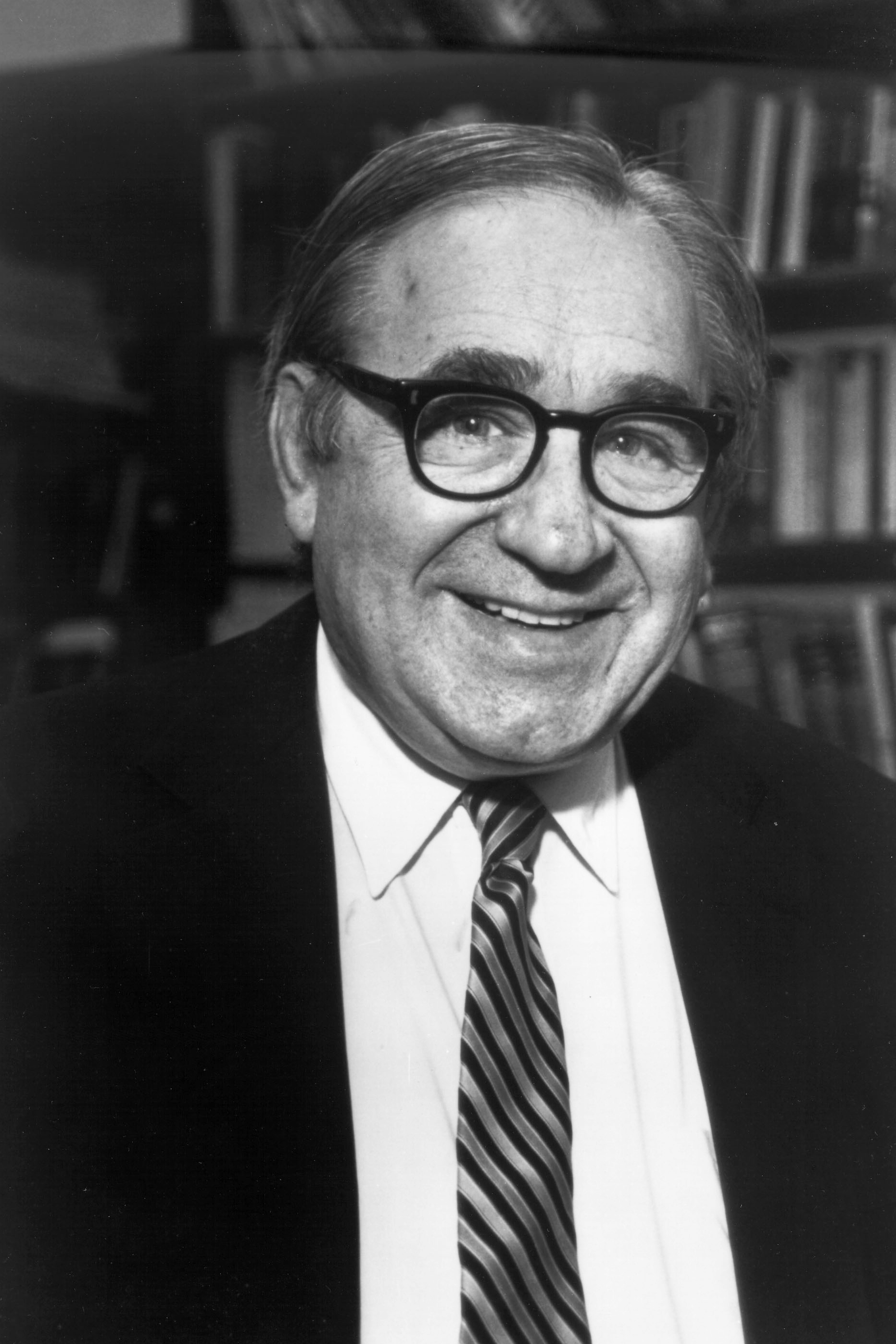
Robert Fogel
- Marc Faber (born 1946), Swiss investor based in Thailand
- Armin Falk (born 1968), German economist and academic
- Günter Faltin (born 1944), German economist and entrepreneur
- Eugene Fama born 1939), American economist known for efficient-market hypothesis
- Emmanuel Farhi (1978–2020), French economist and academic
- M. J. Farrell (1926–1975), British economist
- Jeff Faux (living), American economist and writer
- Henry Fawcett (1833–1884), British economist and statesman
- Nikolay Fedorenko (1917–2006), Soviet/Russian economist and chemist
- Ernst Fehr (born 1956), Austrian/Swiss behavioral economist
- Martin Feldstein (1939–2019), American economist and academic
- Edgar Fiedler (1929–2003), American economist
- Randall K. Filer (born 1952), American economist and researcher
- Amy Finkelstein (born 1973), American economist and researcher
- Stanley Fischer (born 1943), American/Israeli economist and bank governor
- Price V. Fishback (b. c. 1955), American economic historian
- Irving Fisher (1867–1947), American economist and social campaigner
- Jon Fisher (born 1972), American entrepreneur and philanthropist
- Jean-Paul Fitoussi (1942–2022), French economist and academic
- William Fleetwood (1656–1723), English statistician and bishop
- Marcus Fleming (1911–1976), British economist and stabilization expert
- Amelia Fletcher (born 1966), British economist and singer
- John E. Floyd (born 1937), Canadian economist and academic
- Karnit Flug (born 1955), Polish/Israeli economist and bank governor
- Robert Fogel (1926–2013), American economic historian
- Foster and Catchings, American economists William Trufant Foster and Waddill Catchings
- Charles Fourier (1772–1837), French philosopher and socialist thinker
- Joseph Francois (born 1961), Swiss economist and academic
- Robert H. Frank (born 1939), American economist and academic
- Jeffrey Frankel (born 1952), American macroeconomist
- Bernie Fraser (born 1941), Australian economist and bank governor
- Christopher Freeman (1921–2010), British economist and academic
- Richard B. Freeman (born 1943), American economist and academic
- Bruno Frey (born 1941), Swiss economist and academic
- Benjamin M. Friedman (born 1944), American political economist
- David D. Friedman (born 1945), American microeconomist and theorist
- Milton Friedman (1912–2006), American economist and Nobel Prize winner
- Rose Friedman (1910–2009), American free-market economist
- Ragnar Anton Kittil Frisch (1895–1973), Norwegian economist and Nobel Prize co-winner
- Roland Fryer (born 1977), American economist
- Drew Fudenberg (born 1957), American economist and game-theory expert
- Masahisa Fujita (藤田昌久, born 1943), Japanese economist and academic
- Connel Fullenkamp (born 1965), American economist and academic
- Jason Furman (born 1970), American economist and academic
- Celso Furtado (1920–2004), Brazilian economist and development expert

== G ==
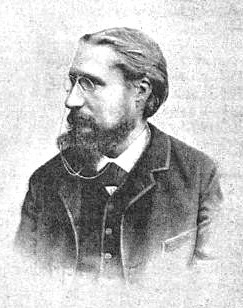
Charles Gide

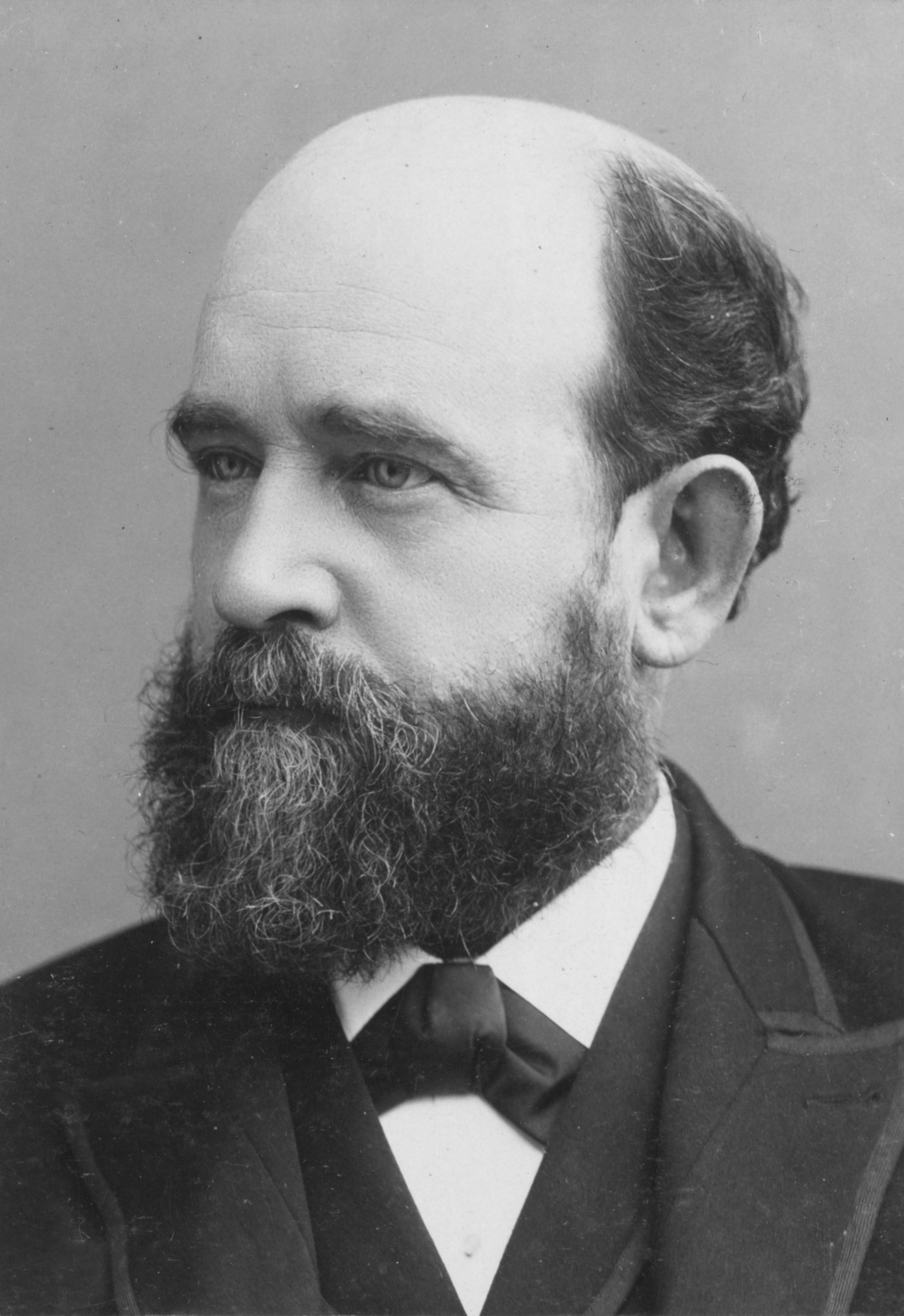
Henry George

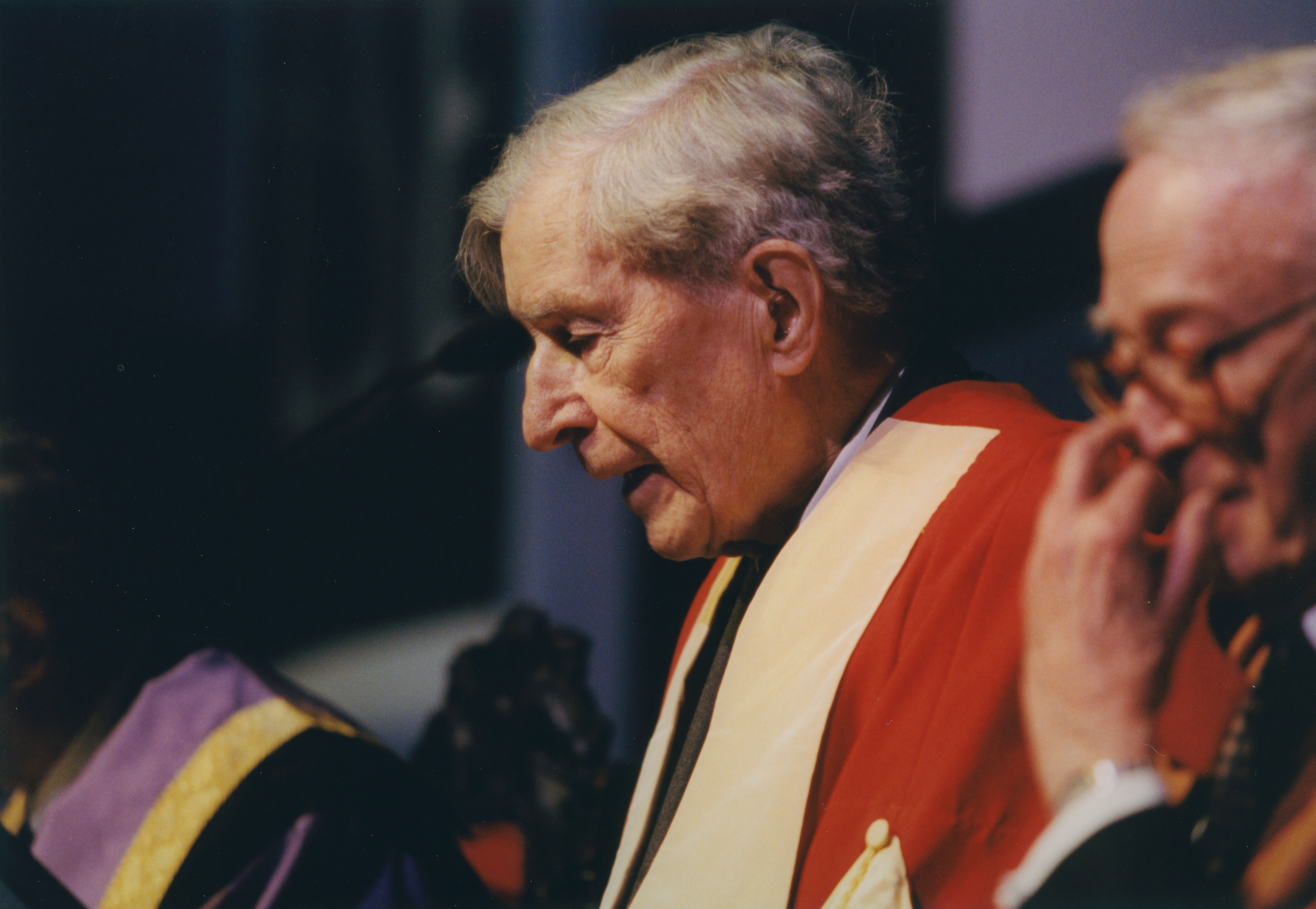
John Kenneth Galbraith

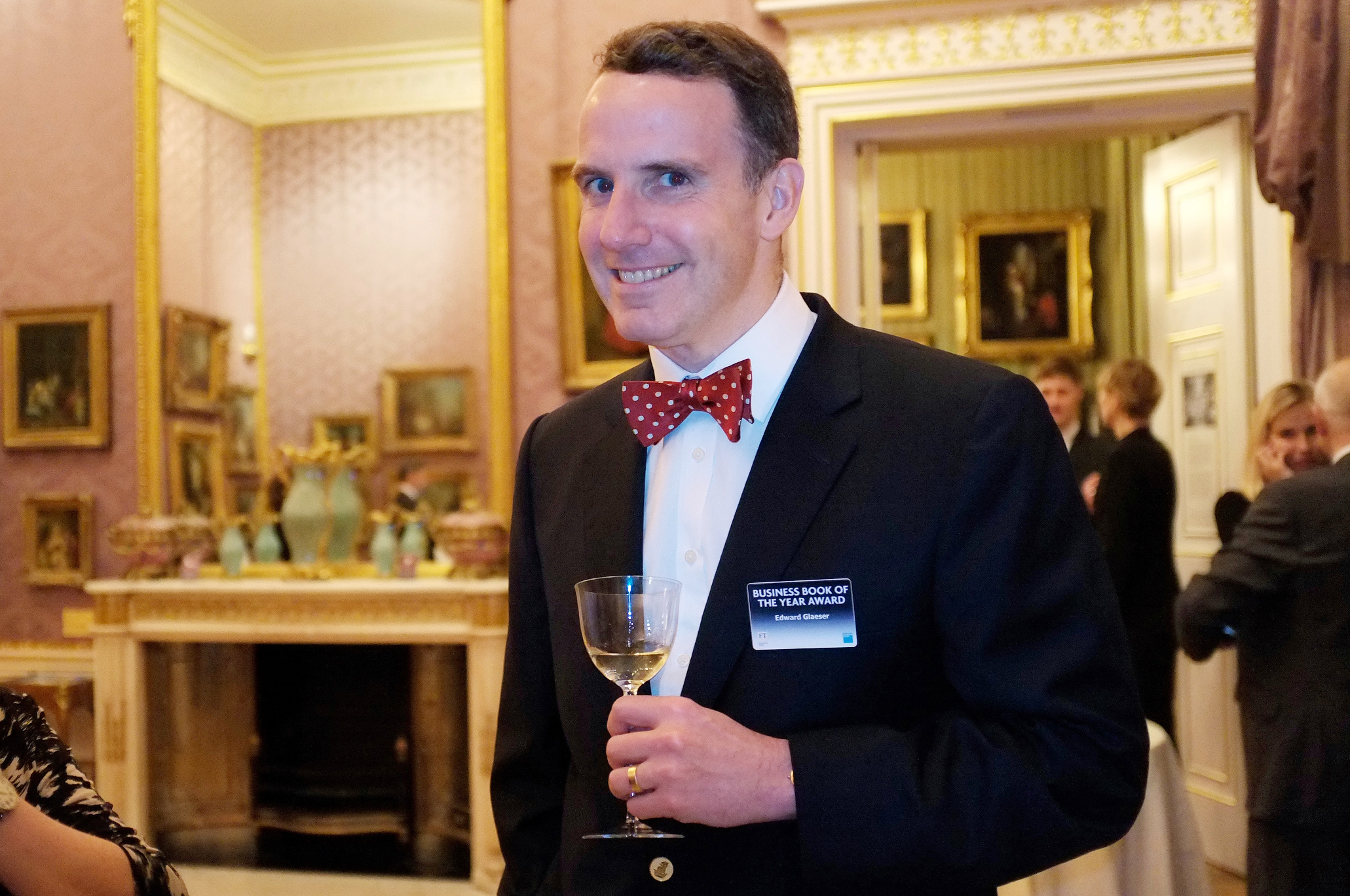
Edward Glaeser

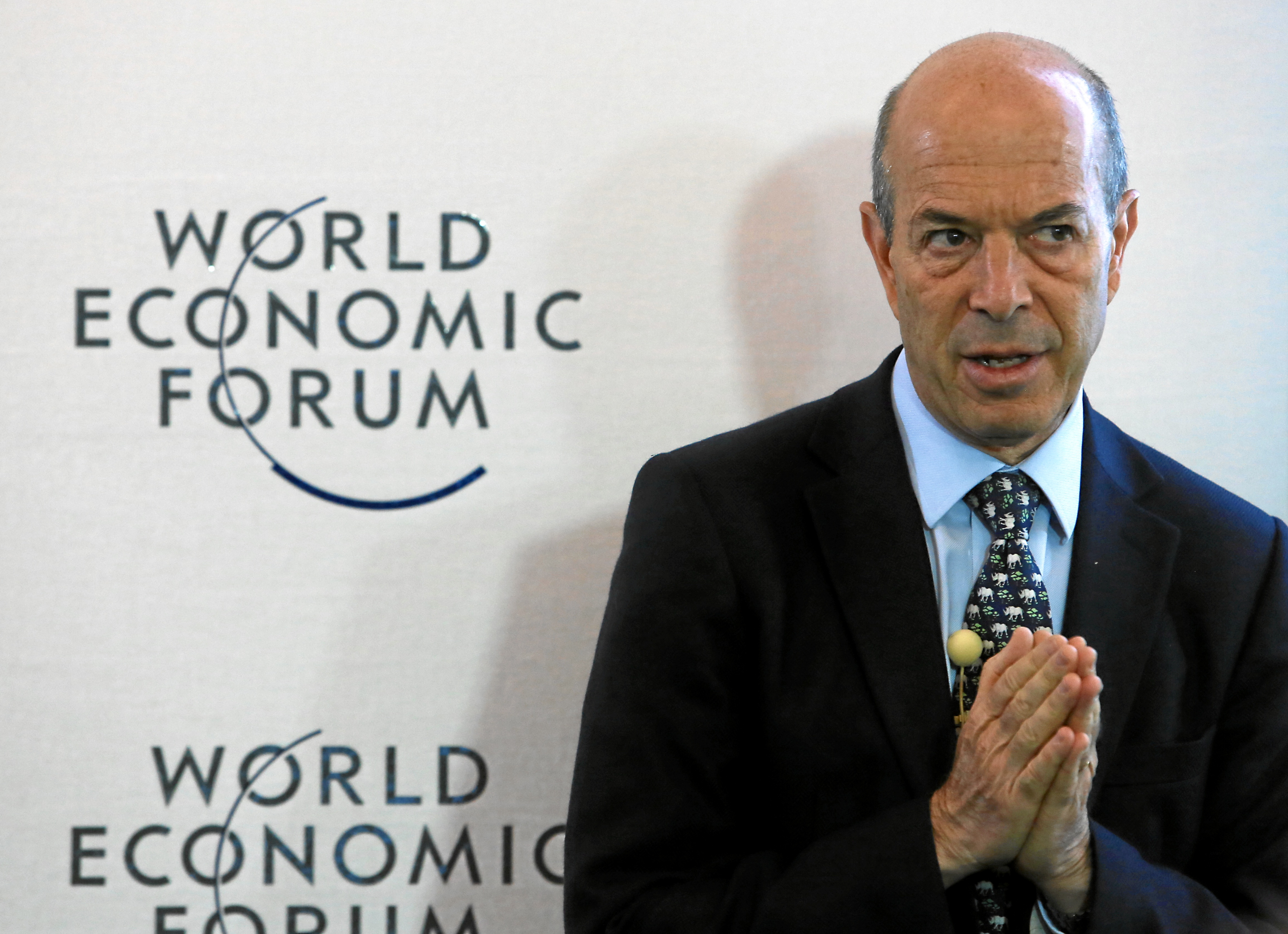
Ian Goldin
- Xavier Gabaix (born 1971), French/American economist
- Yegor Gaidar (1956–2009), Soviet/Russian economist and politician
- James Kenneth Galbraith (born 1952), American economist and academic
- John Kenneth Galbraith (1908–2006), Canadian/American economist and politician
- David Gale (1921–2008), American mathematician and economist
- William G. Gale (born 1959), American economist and politician
- Jordi Galí (born 1961), Spanish macroeconomist
- A. Ronald Gallant (born 1942), American econometrician
- Mauro Gallegati (born 1958), Italian economist and scholar
- Oded Galor (born 1953), Israeli/American economist and academic
- Francisco Javier Carrillo Gamboa (living), Mexican knowledge-systems researcher
- László Garai (1935–2019), Hungarian psychologist and economist
- Gonzalo Garland (born 1959), Peruvian economist and researcher
- Pierangelo Garegnani (1930–2011), Italian economist and academic
- Norton Garfinkle (born 1931), American economist and economic historian
- Leonid Gatovsky (1903–1997), Russian/Soviet economist
- John Geanakoplos (born 1955), American economist and academic
- Jacques Généreux (born 1956), French economist and politician
- Henry George (1839–1897), American political economist
- Nicholas Georgescu-Roegen (1906–1994), Romanian statistician and economist
- Mark Gertler (born 1951), American economist and academic
- Silvio Gesell (1862–1930), German economist and entrepreneur
- Jayati Ghosh (born 1955), Indian development economist
- Eric Ghysels (born 1956), Belgian economist and econometrician
- Francesco Giavazzi (born 1949), Italian economist and academic
- Charles Gide (1847–1932), French economist and economic historian
- George Gilder (born 1939), American economist and investor
- Richard T. Gill (1927–2010), American economist and opera singer
- Victor Ginsburgh (born 1939), Belgian economist
- Herbert Gintis (born 1940), American economist and behavioral scientist
- Edward Glaeser (born 1967), American economist and academic
- Rachel Glennerster (born 1965), British economist
- Andrew Glyn (1943–2007), English economist
- William Godwin (1756–1836), English economist and writer
- Claudia Goldin (born 1946), American economist and government official
- Ian Goldin (living), South African/British economist and program director
- Jose Antonio Gomariz (1919–2005), Argentine economist and educator
- Charles Goodhart (born 1936), British economist and academic
- George Goodman (aka "Adam Smith", 1930–2014), American economist and broadcaster
- Austan Goolsbee (born 1969), American economist
- Gita Gopinath (born 1971), Indian/American economist
- Myron J. Gordon (1920–2010), American/Canadian economist and academic
- Robert J. Gordon (born 1940), American economist
- Gary Gorton (b. c. 1951), American economist and finance educator
- Hermann Heinrich Gossen (1810–1858), German economist
- Kurt Gossweiler (1917–2017), German historian and economist
- Christian Gouriéroux (born 1959), French econometrician
- Benjamin Graham (1894–1976), British/American economist and investor
- Phil Gramm (born 1942), American economist and politician
- Clive Granger (1934–2009), Welsh/American econometrician
- George Grantham (born 1941), American economist and academic
- William Greene (born 1951), American economist
- Alan Greenspan (1926–2026), American economist and finance official
- Thomas Gresham (c. 1519–1579), English merchant and financier
- Stephany Griffith-Jones (born 1947), British/American economist
- Zvi Griliches (1930–1999), Lithuanian/American economist
- Elgin Groseclose (1899–1983), American economist and statesman
- Gene Grossman (born 1955), American economist and academic
- Henryk Grossman (1881–1950), Polish/German economist and revolutionary
- Jonathan Gruber (born 1965), American economist and academic
- Rebeca Grynspan (born 1955), Costa Rican economist
- Gu Zhun (顾准, 1915–1974), Chinese economist and post-Marxist
- Dominique Guellec (living), French economist and official
- Maria-Carmen Guisan (living), Spanish economist
- Faruk Gül (living), Turkish/American economist and academic

== H ==
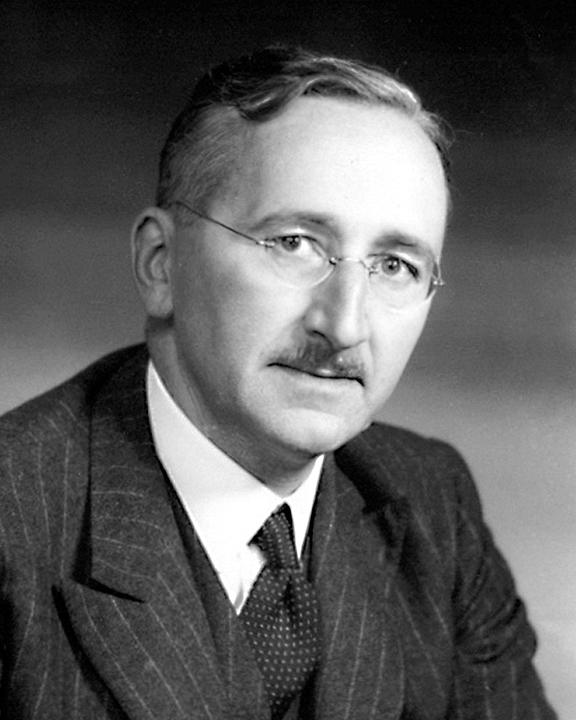
Friedrich Hayek

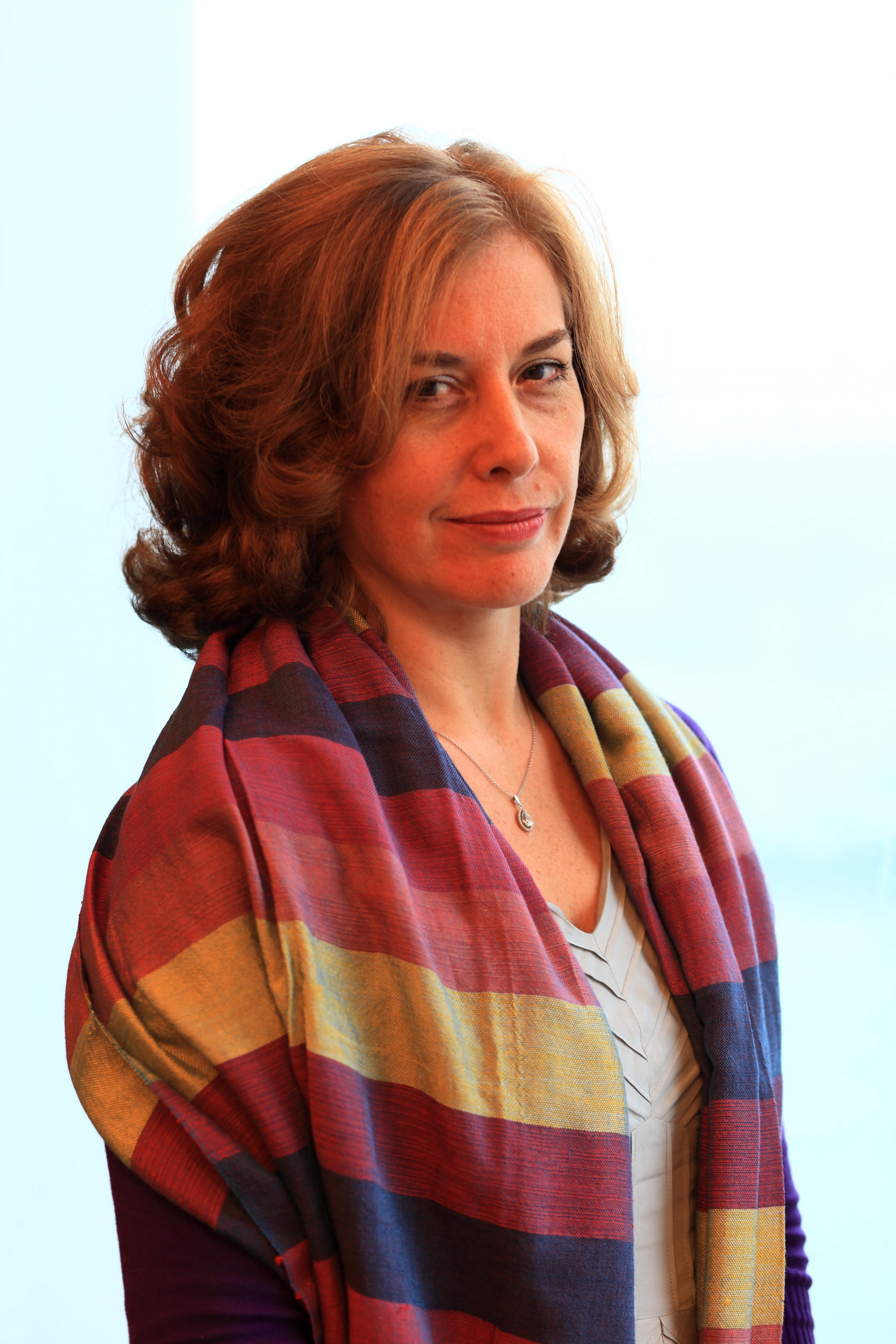
Alicia García-Herrero

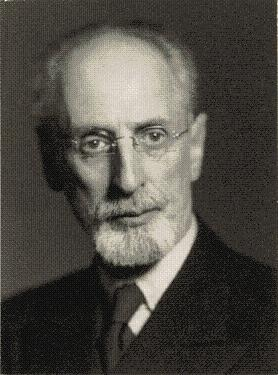
Eli Heckscher

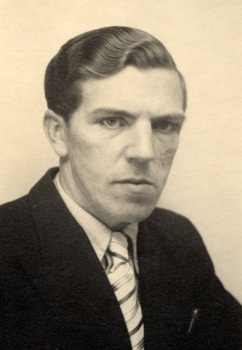
Trygve Haavelmo

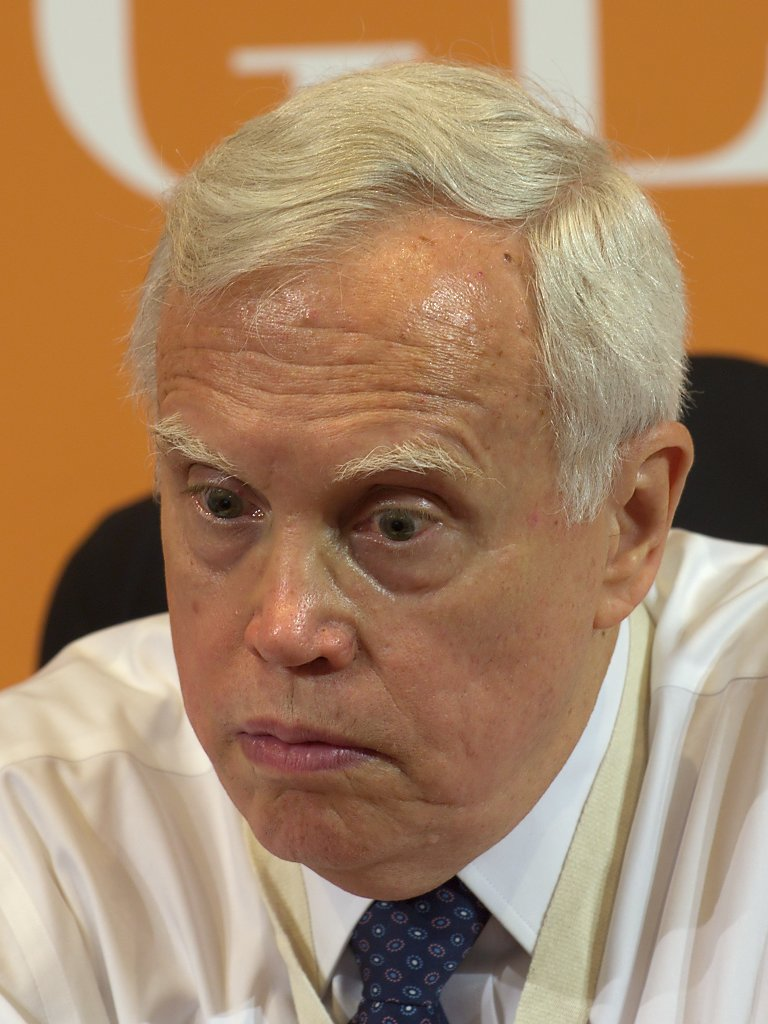
James Heckman

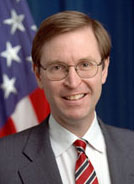
Glenn Hubbard

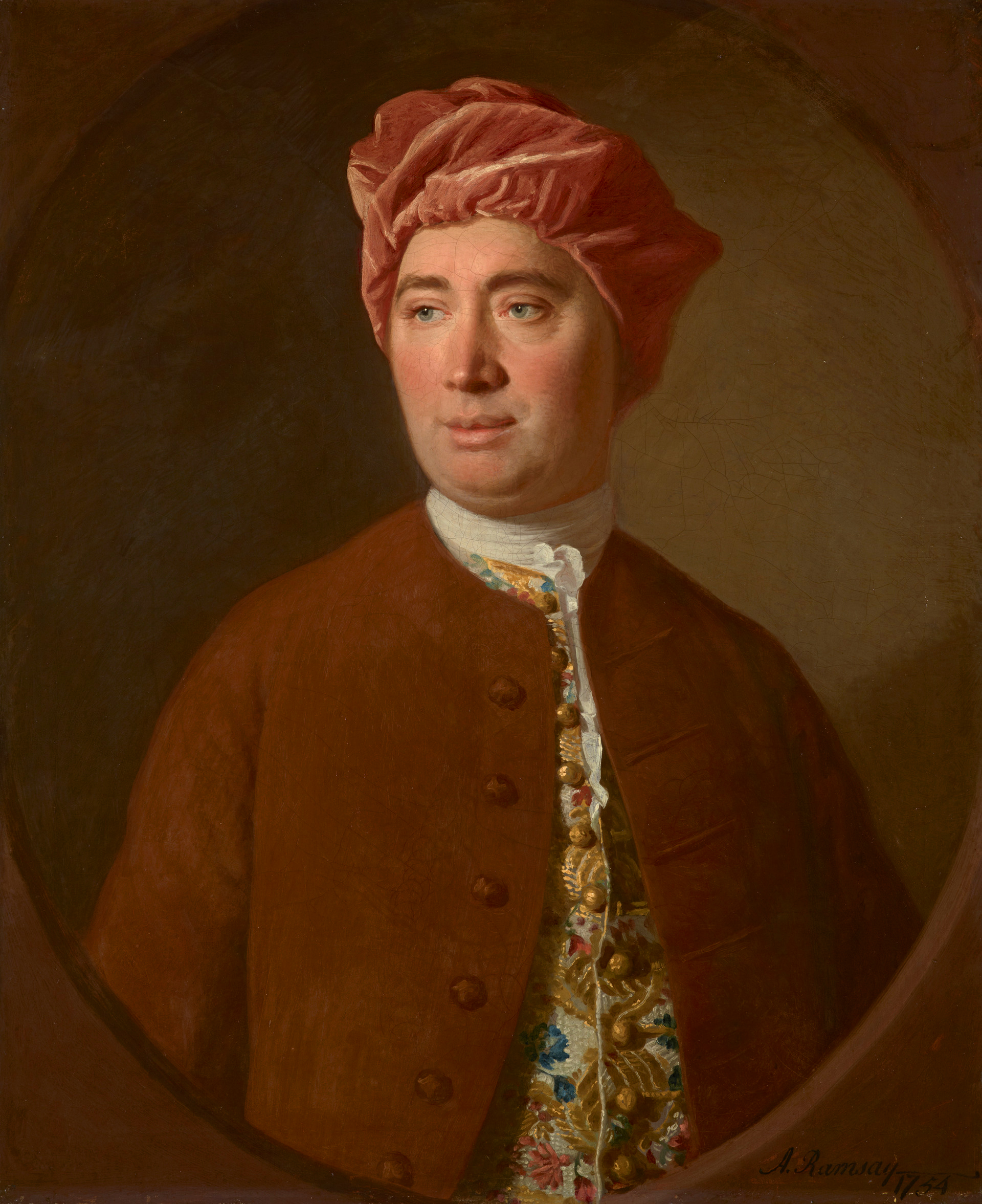
David Hume

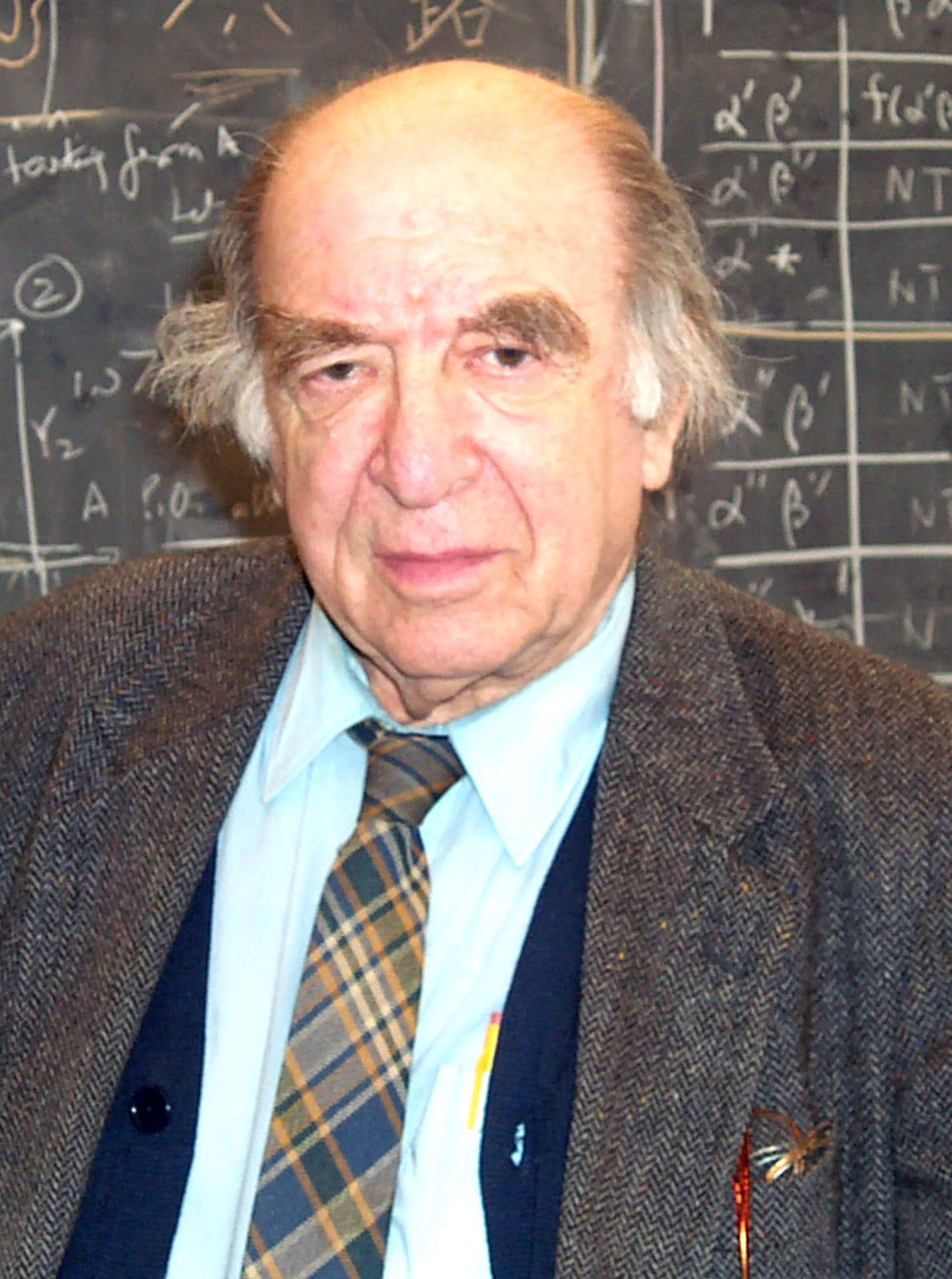
Leonid Hurwicz
- Trygve Haavelmo (1911–1999), Norwegian economist and Nobel laureate
- Gottfried Haberler (1900–1995), Austrian/American economist
- Charles Hall (1740–1825), English social critic and physician
- Robert Hall (born 1943), American economist and academic
- Andrew Hughes Hallett (1947–1919), Scottish economist and academic
- John Haltiwanger (born 1955), American economist
- Daniel S. Hamermesh (born 1943), American economist
- James D. Hamilton (born 1954), American economist and academic
- Steve H. Hanke (born 1942), American applied economist
- Alvin Hansen (1887–1975), American economist and academic
- Lars Peter Hansen (born 1952), American economist and academic
- Peter Reinhard Hansen (born 1968), Danish economist and academic
- Eric Hanushek (born 1943), American economist
- Mahbub ul Haq (1934–1998), Indian/Pakistani economist and politician
- Arnold Harberger (born 1924), American economist
- Tim Harford (born 1973), English economist and broadcaster
- Charles Knickerbocker Harley (born 1943), American economic historian
- Stephen Harper (born 1959), Canadian economist and Prime Minister (2006–2015)
- Roy Harrod (1900–1978), English economist and biographer
- John Harsanyi (1920–2000), Hungarian/American economist and Nobel Prize winner
- Oliver Hart (born 1948), British/American economist and Nobel laureate
- Campbell Harvey (born 1958), Canadian/American economist and academic
- Jerry A. Hausman (born 1946), American econometrician
- Bohdan Hawrylyshyn (1926–2016), Ukrainian/Canadian economist and thinker
- Friedrich Hayek (1899–1992), Austrian/American economist and philosopher
- Henry Hazlitt (1894–1993), American journalist, economist and philosopher
- James Heckman (born 1944), American economist and Nobel laureate
- Eli Heckscher (1879–1952), Swedish political economist and economic historian
- Robert Heilbroner (1919–2005), American economist and historian of economics
- Carolyn Heinrich (born 1967), American historian and academic
- Christian Hellwig (living), German macroeconomist
- Elhanan Helpman (born 1946), Israeli economist and academic
- Hazel Henderson (1933–2022), English economist, ecologist and broadcaster
- David Forbes Hendry (born 1944), English econometrician and academic
- Peter Blair Henry, Jamaican-born economist
- Ken Henry (born 1957), Australian civil servant
- Alicia García-Herrero, Spanish and writer
- Noreena Hertz (born 1967), English economist and broadcaster
- William Hewins (1865–1931), English economist and politician
- John Hicks (1904–1989), English economist and joint Nobel laureate
- Michael J. Hicks (born 1962), American economist and academic
- Robert Higgs (born 1944), American economic historian
- Rudolf Hilferding (1877–1941), Austrian economist and politician
- Jack Hirshleifer (1925–2005), American economist and academic
- John A. Hobson (1858–1940), English economist and social scientist
- Thomas Hodgskin (1787–1869), English political economist and socialist
- Samuel Hollander (born 1937), English/Canadian/Israeli economist
- Bengt Holmström (born 1949), Finnish/American economist and academic
- Charles A. Holt (born 1948), American behavioral economist
- Harry J. Holzer (born 1957), American economist and educator
- Kevin Hoover (born 1955), American economist and philosopher
- Hans-Hermann Hoppe (born 1949), German/American economist and philosopher
- Charles Horioka (チャールズ・ユウジ・ホリオカ, born 1956), American/Japanese economist and academic
- Branko Horvat (1928–2003), Yugoslav/Croatian economist and politician
- Harold Hotelling (1895–1973), American statistician and theorist
- Hendrik S. Houthakker (1924-2008), Dutch-American economist
- Peter Howitt (born 1946), Canadian economist
- Elizabeth Ellis Hoyt (1893–1980), American economist, considered the inventor of the modern day Consumer Price Index
- William Hsiao (蕭慶倫m born 1936), Chinese/American economist and academic
- Yukon Huang (born 1944), Chinese/American economist
- Glenn Hubbard (born 1958), American economist and academic
- Michael Hudson (born 1939), American economist and analyst
- Jesús Huerta de Soto (born 1956), Spanish economist
- David Hume (1711–1776), Scottish economist and philosopher
- Thomas M. Humphrey (born 1935), American economist
- Jennifer Hunt (1913–2015), American economist and politician
- Leonid Hurwicz (1917–2008), Polish/American economist and mathematician
- Terence Wilmot Hutchison (1912–2007), English economist
- Jörg Guido Hülsmann (born 1966), German economist

== I ==
- Sri Mulyani Indrawati (born 1962), Indonesian economist, banker and politician
- Stefan Ingves (born 1953), Swedish national bank governor and economist
- Jay Inslee (born 1951), American economist and governor of Washington
- Douglas Irwin (living), American economist and academic
- T. M. Thomas Isaac (born 1952), Indian economist
- Mugur Isărescu (born 1949), Romanian national bank governor and economist
- Otmar Issing (born 1936), German economist and economic policy-maker
- Makoto Itoh (1936–2023), Japanese economist

== J ==
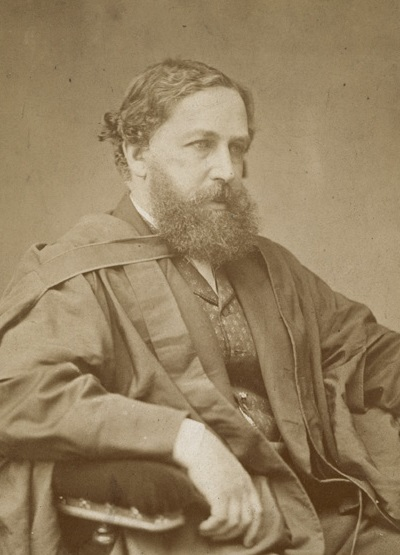
William Stanley Jevons
- Elias Jabbour (born 1975), Brazilian economic geographer, economist and academic
- Matthew O. Jackson (born 1962), American economist and academic
- Tim Jackson (born 1957), British ecological economist
- David A. Jaeger (born 1964), American economist and researcher
- Davoud Danesh-Jafari, Iranian politician and economist
- Ravi Jagannathan (born 1949), American economist and academic
- Eliot Janeway (1913–1993), American economist and author
- William H. Janeway (born 1943), American economist and venture capitalist
- Robert A. Jarrow (living), American economist and academic
- Peter Jay (born 1937), English economist and diplomat
- Michael Jensen (born 1939), American financial economist
- William Stanley Jevons (1835–1882), English economist and logician
- Ji Chaoding (1903–1963), Chinese economist
- Leif Johansen (1930–1982), Norwegian economist and academic
- Søren Johansen (born 1939), Danish statistician and econometrician
- Harry Gordon Johnson (1923–1977), Canadian economist
- Simon Johnson (born 1963), English/American and IMF economist
- Lewis Webster Jones (1899–1975), American economist and academic
- Richard Jones (1790–1855), English economist
- Dan Johnson (b. c. 1969), Canadian/American microeconomist and entrepreneur
- Thomas Jordan (born 1963), Swiss economist and central banker
- Dale W. Jorgenson (born 1933), American economist and academic
- Boyan Jovanovic (born 1952), American economist and academic

== K ==
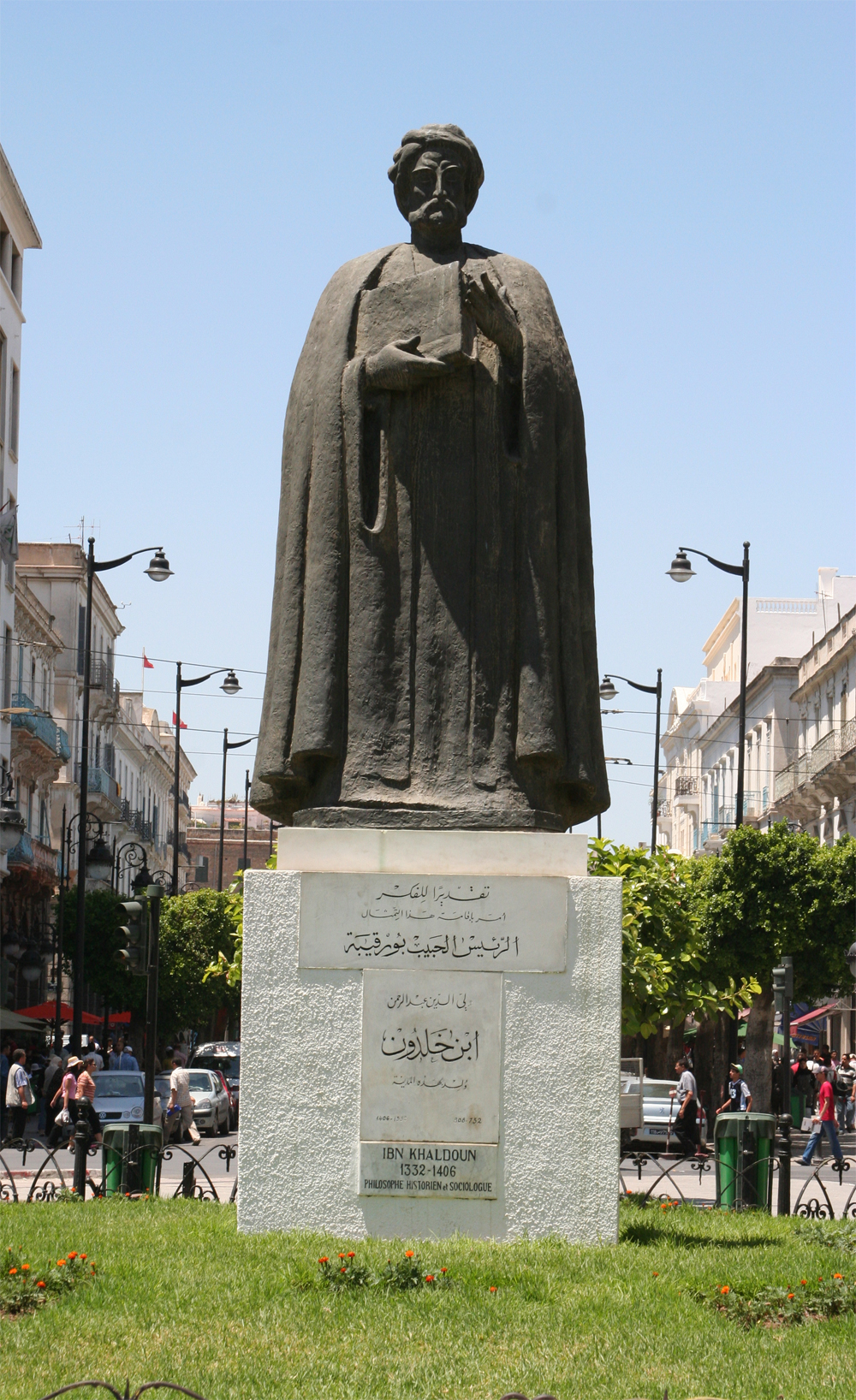
Ibn Khaldun

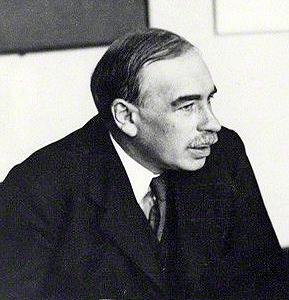
John Maynard Keynes

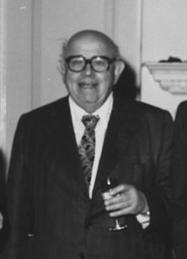
Nicholas Kaldor

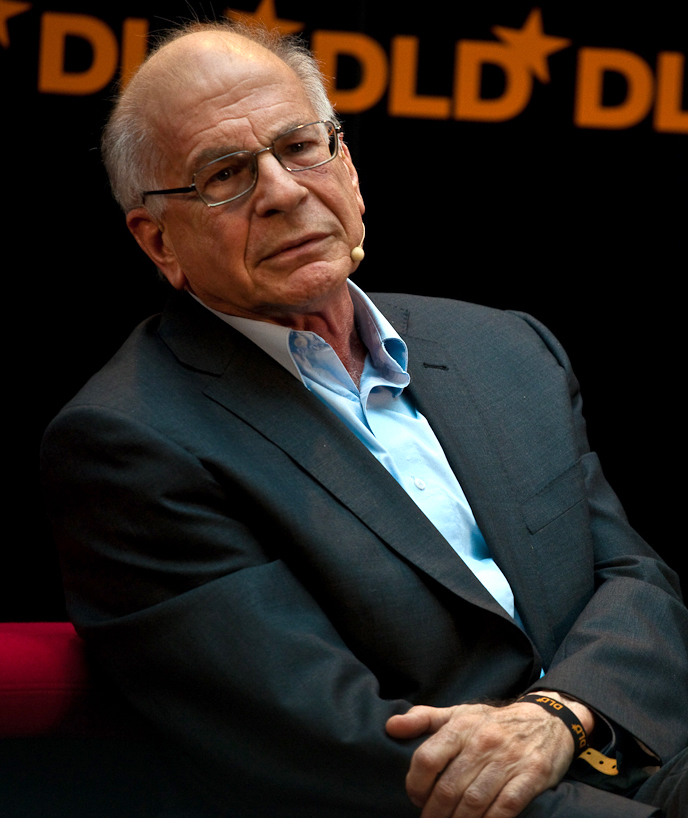
Daniel Kahneman

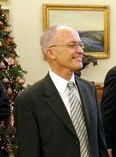
Finn E. Kydland

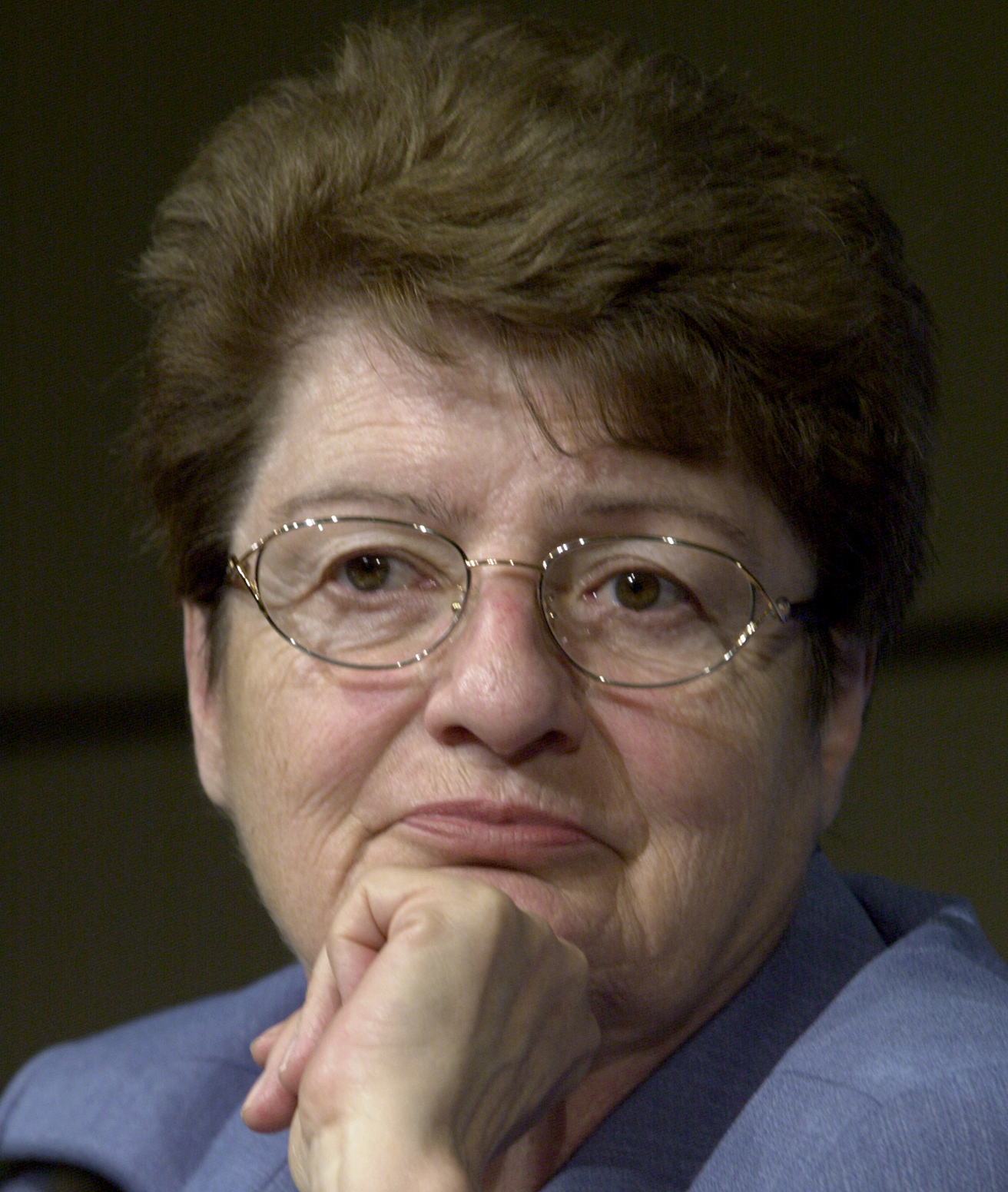
Anne Osborn Krueger
- Daniel Kahneman (born 1934), Israeli/American economist and psychologist
- Ehud Kalai (born 1942), Israeli/American game theorist and mathematical economist
- Nicholas Kaldor (1908–1986), Hungarian/British economist and government advisor
- Michał Kalecki (1899–1970), Polish economist
- Thomas Kane (born 1961), American educational economist
- Leonid Kantorovich (1912–1986), Soviet mathematician and economist
- Ethan Kaplan (living), American economist and academic
- Steven Kaplan (born 1959), American business economist
- Edvard Kardelj (1910–1979), Yugoslav economist and politician
- Dean Karlan (living), American development economist
- Michael Kaser (1926–2021), English economist
- Lawrence F. Katz (born 1959), American economist and academic
- Hajime Kawakami (1879–1946), Japanese marxist economist and economic historian
- Steve Keen (born 1953), Australian economist and educator
- Timothy J. Kehoe (born 1953), American economist and academic
- Stephanie Kelton (born 1969), American economist and academic
- A. R. Kemal (1946–2008), Pakistani economist and policy-maker
- Peter Kenen (1932–2012), American international economist
- Charles Kennedy (1923–1997), American theoretical economist
- Li Keqiang (李克强, born 1955), Chinese economist and politician
- Srgjan Kerim (born 1948), Yugoslav/Macedonian economist and diplomat
- John Maynard Keynes (1883–1946), English political economist
- Ibn Khaldun (1332–1406), Arab social scientist
- Mushtaq Khan (born 1961), British/Bangladeshi economist and academic
- Homi Kharas (living), American economist and UN executive
- Fahmida Khatun (living), Bangladeshi economist and policy analyst
- Mwai Kibaki (1931–2022), Kenyan economist and politician
- Robin Kibuuka (living), Ugandan economist
- Mervyn King, English economist and Bank of England governor
- Robert G. King (born 1951), American macroeconomist
- Bruce Kingma (born 1961), American economist and entrepreneur
- Israel Kirzner (born 1930), English/American economist
- Nobuhiro Kiyotaki (清滝信宏, born 1955), Japanese/American macroeconomist
- Lawrence Klein (1920–2013), American econometrician and Nobel Prize winner
- Morton Klein (born 1947), German/American economist and statistician
- Morris Kleiner (b.1948), American labor economist
- Paul Klemperer (born 1956), English economist and academic
- Andrew Kliman (born 1955), American economist
- Arnold Kling (born 1954), American economist and writer
- Teun Kloek (born 1934), Dutch econometrician
- Jan Kmenta (1928–2016), Czech/American economist and statistician
- Frank Knight (1885–1972), American economist and academic
- Lilian Knowles (1870–1926), English economic historian
- Klaas Knot (born 1967), Dutch economist and central banker
- Narayana Kocherlakota (born 1963), American economist and academic
- Leopold Kohr (1909–1994), Austrian/British economist and political scientist
- John Komlos (born 1944), Hungarian/American economic historian
- Nikolai Kondratiev (1892–1938), Russian/Soviet economist and economic policy-maker
- Tjalling Koopmans (1910–1985), Dutch/American economist and mathematician
- Roger C. Kormendi (1949–2009), American economist and finance expert
- János Kornai (1928–2021), Hungarian economist and theorist
- Andrey Korotayev (born 1961), Soviet/Russian economic historian and sociologist
- Tadeusz Kowalik (1926–2012), Polish economist
- Hagen Krämer (born 1963), German economist
- Naum Krasner (1924–1999), Soviet/Russian economist and mathematician
- Lawrence B. Krause (born 1929), American economist and economic advisor
- Jan Kregel (born 1944), American economist and UN executive
- Michael Kremer (born 1964), American development economist and academic
- David M. Kreps (born 1950), American game theorist and economist
- Lev Kritzman (1890–1938), Soviet economist
- Peter Kropotkin (1842–1921), Russian economist and political scientist
- Anne Osborn Krueger (born 1934), American economist and IMF executive
- Maynard C. Krueger (1906–1991), American economics professor
- Paul Krugman (born 1953), American economist, academic and Nobel Prize winner
- Per Krusell (born 1959), Swedish macroeconomist
- Stanisław Krusiński (1857–1886), Polish economist and sociologist
- Ludwik Krzywicki (1859–1941), Polish economist, anthropologist and sociologist
- Jürgen Kuczynski (1904–1997), German economist
- Lawrence Kudlow (born 1947), American finance analyst
- Adriana Kugler (born 1969), American economist and public-policy academic
- Maurice Kugler (born 1967), American economist and public-policy academic
- Rajiv Kumar (born 1951), Indian economist and politician
- Robert Kuttner (born 1943), American economic and economic-policy writer
- Simon Kuznets (1901–1985), Russian/American economist and statistician
- Vladimir Kvint (living), Soviet/Russian economist and strategist
- Finn E. Kydland (born 1943), Norwegian/American economist and academic

== L ==
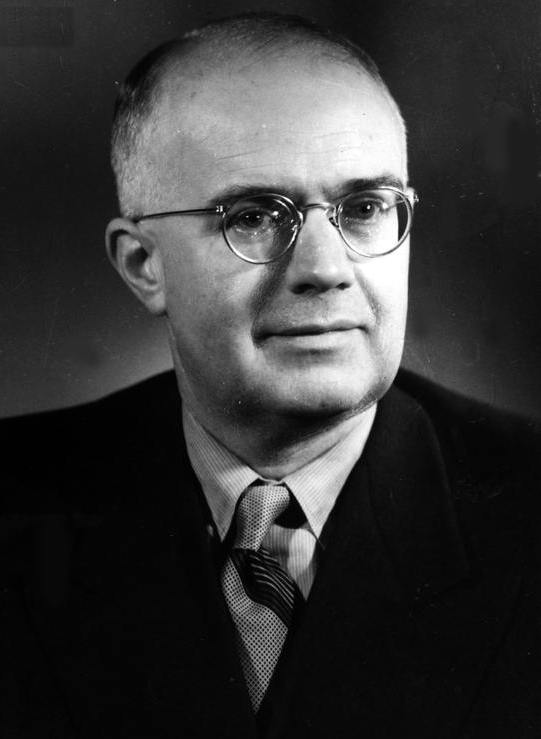
Oskar Lange

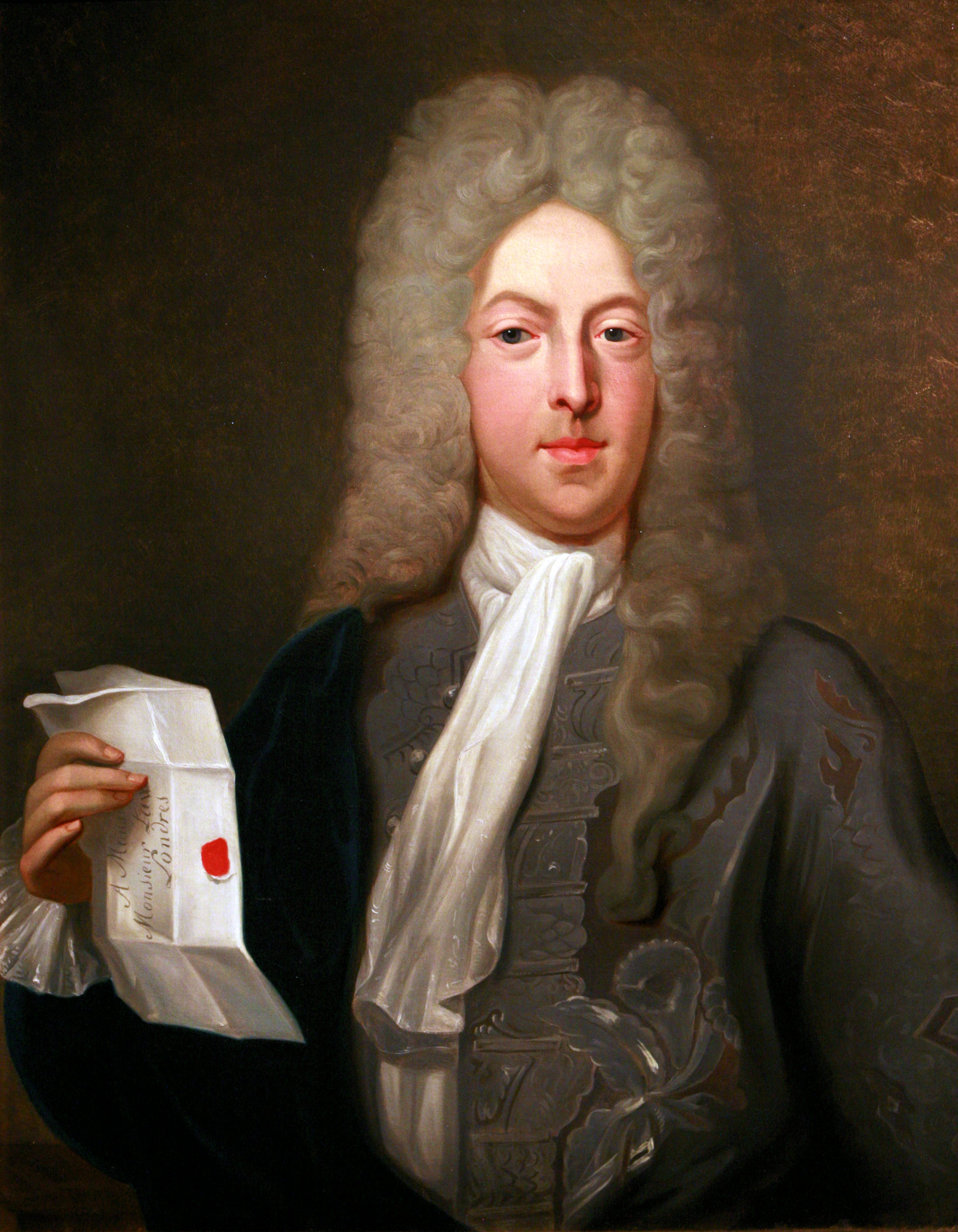
John Law

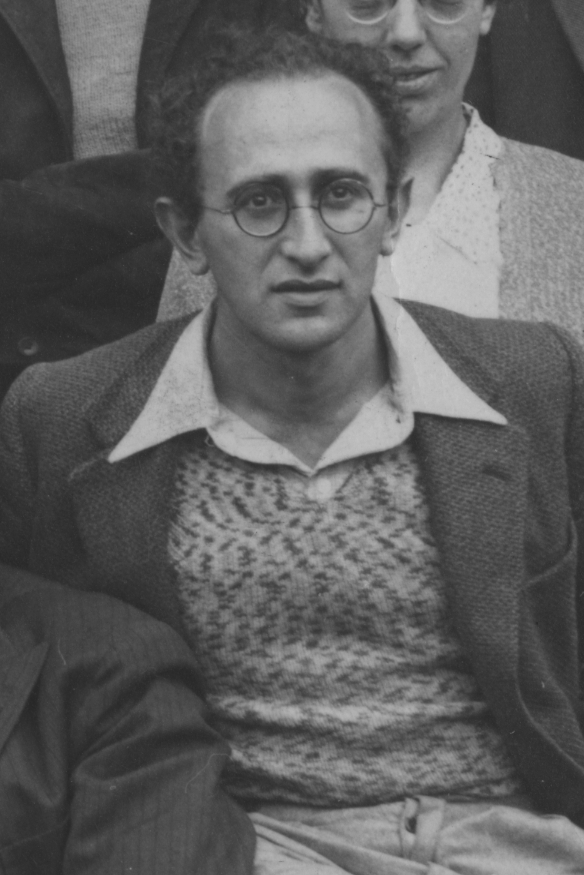
Abba Lerner

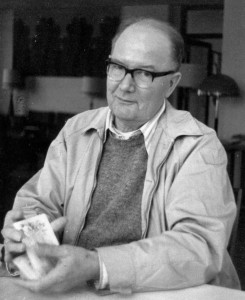
Bernard Lonergan

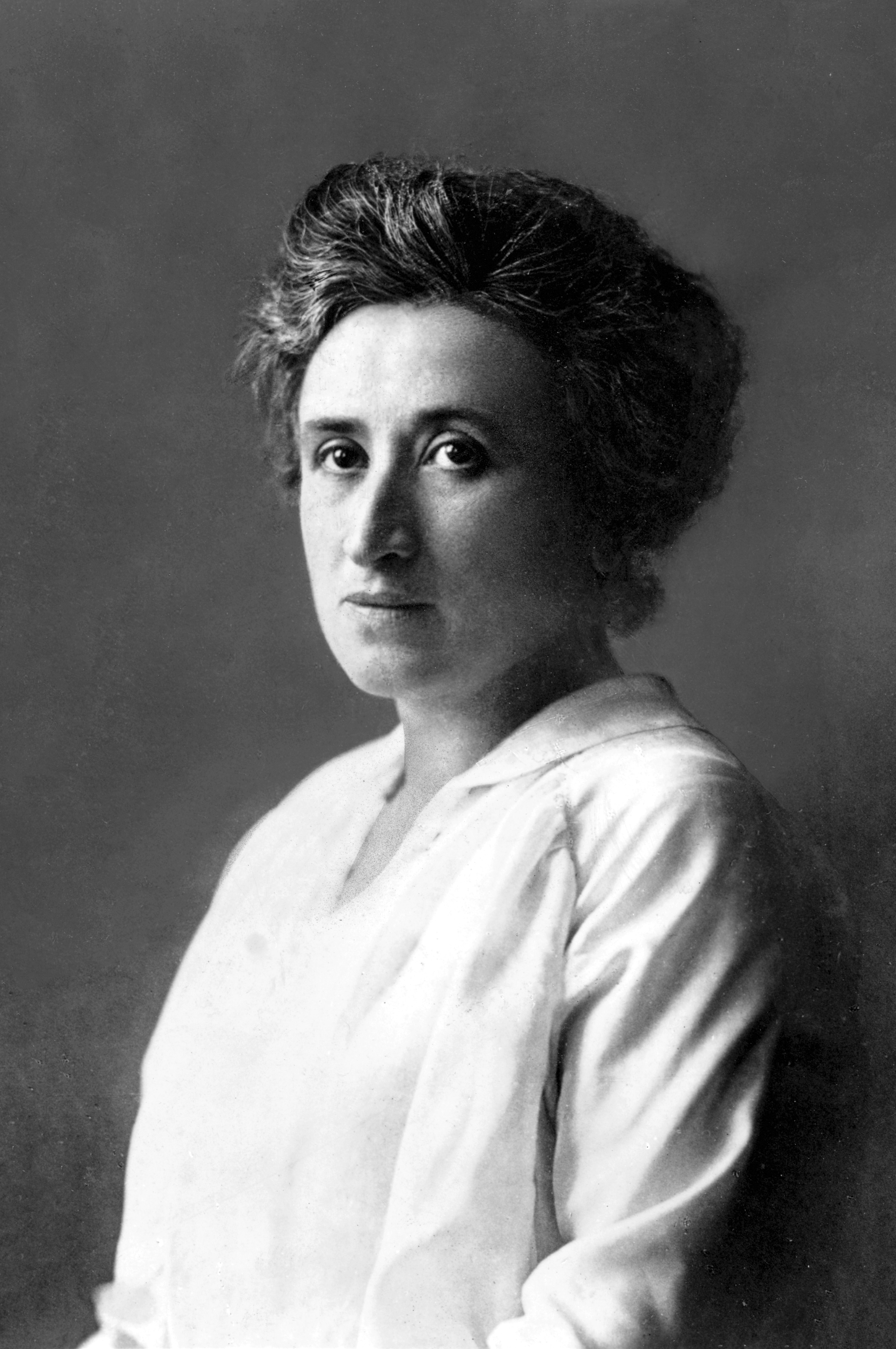
Rosa Luxemburg

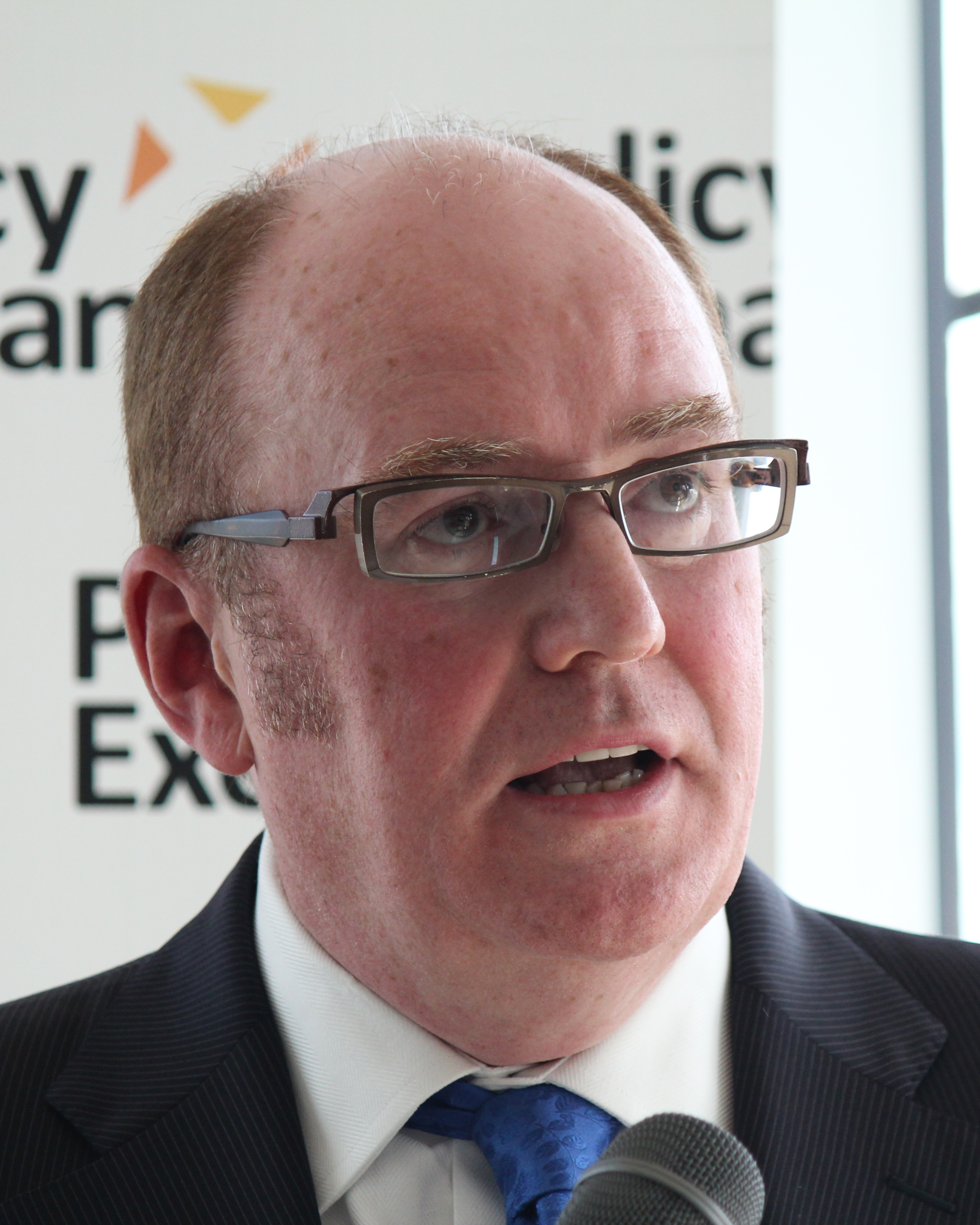
Gerard Lyons
- Ludwig Lachmann (1906–1990), German economist
- Arthur Laffer (born 1940), American economist
- Jean-Jacques Laffont (1947–2004), French economist
- Ricardo Lagos (born 1938), Chilean economist and lawyer
- David Laibman (born 1942), American economist
- David Laibson (born 1966), American economist
- David Laidler (born 1938), English monetary economist
- Domingo Laino (born 1935), Paraguayan economist and politician
- John A. Laitner (born 1947), American economist and environmentalist
- Naomi Lamoreaux (born 1950), American economic historian
- Steven Landsburg (born 1954), American economist
- Philip R. Lane (born 1954), American economist
- Lang Xianping (郎咸平, born 1956), Hong Kong-based economist
- Oskar Lange (1904–1965), Polish economist and diplomat
- Lanrui Feng (1920–2019), Chinese economist
- Serge Latouche (born 1940), French economist
- John Law (1671–1629), Scottish economist
- Richard Layard (born 1934), English labour economist
- Edward Lazear (1948–2020), American economist
- Edward E. Leamer (born 1944), American economist
- Stanley Lebergott (1918–2009), American economist
- Michael A. Lebowitz (1937–2023), American economist and professor
- Emil Lederer (1882–1939), German economist and sociologist
- Lewis Lehrman (born 1938), American economist and banker
- Frederic Sterling Lee (1949–2014), American economist
- Peter Leeson (born 1979), American economist
- Axel Leijonhufvud (1933–2022), Swedish economist
- Manuela Ferreira Leite (born 1940), Portuguese economist and politician
- Leonard Liggio (1933–2014), American writer and academic
- Wassily Leontief (1905–1999), American economist
- Abba P. Lerner (1903–1982), Russian/British economist
- Leonardus Lessius (1554–1623), Flemish moral theologian
- Richard Levin (born 1947), American economist
- David K. Levine (b. c. 1955), American economist
- Lars Lefgren (born 1972), American economist
- Steven D. Levitt (born 1967), American economist
- Arthur Lewbel (c. 1956), American economist
- Arthur Lewis (1915–1991), Saint Lucia economist
- Tracy R. Lewis (living), American economist
- Kevin Leyton-Brown (born 1975), Canadian economist
- Li Minqi (born 1969), Chinese political economist and social scientist
- Evsei Liberman (1897–1981), Russian/Soviet economist
- Justin Yifu Lin (林毅夫, born 1952), Chinese economist
- Michael Lind (born 1962), American writer and academic
- Erik Lindahl (1891–1960), Swedish economist
- Assar Lindbeck (1930–2020), Swedish economist
- Friedrich List (1789–1846), German/American economist
- John A. List (born 1968), American economist
- Andrew Lo (羅聞全, born 1960), Hong Kong/American financial economist
- John Locke (1632–1704), English philosopher
- William Forster Lloyd (1794–1852), English writer on economics
- Bernard Lonergan (1904–1984), Canadian Jesuit and philosopher
- Frédéric Lordon (born 1962), French economist and philosopher
- Max O. Lorenz (1876–1959), American economist
- Pascal Lorot (born 1960), French economist and geo-politician
- Andreas Löschel (living), German economist
- John R. Lott (born 1958), American economist and political commentator
- Robert Lucas, Jr. (1937–2023), American economist
- Stephen J. Luczo (born 1957), American chief executive
- Rosa Luxemburg (1871–1919), Polish-born economist and revolutionary socialist
- Patrick Lynch (1917–2001), Irish economist
- Gerard Lyons (born 1961), English political economist

== M ==
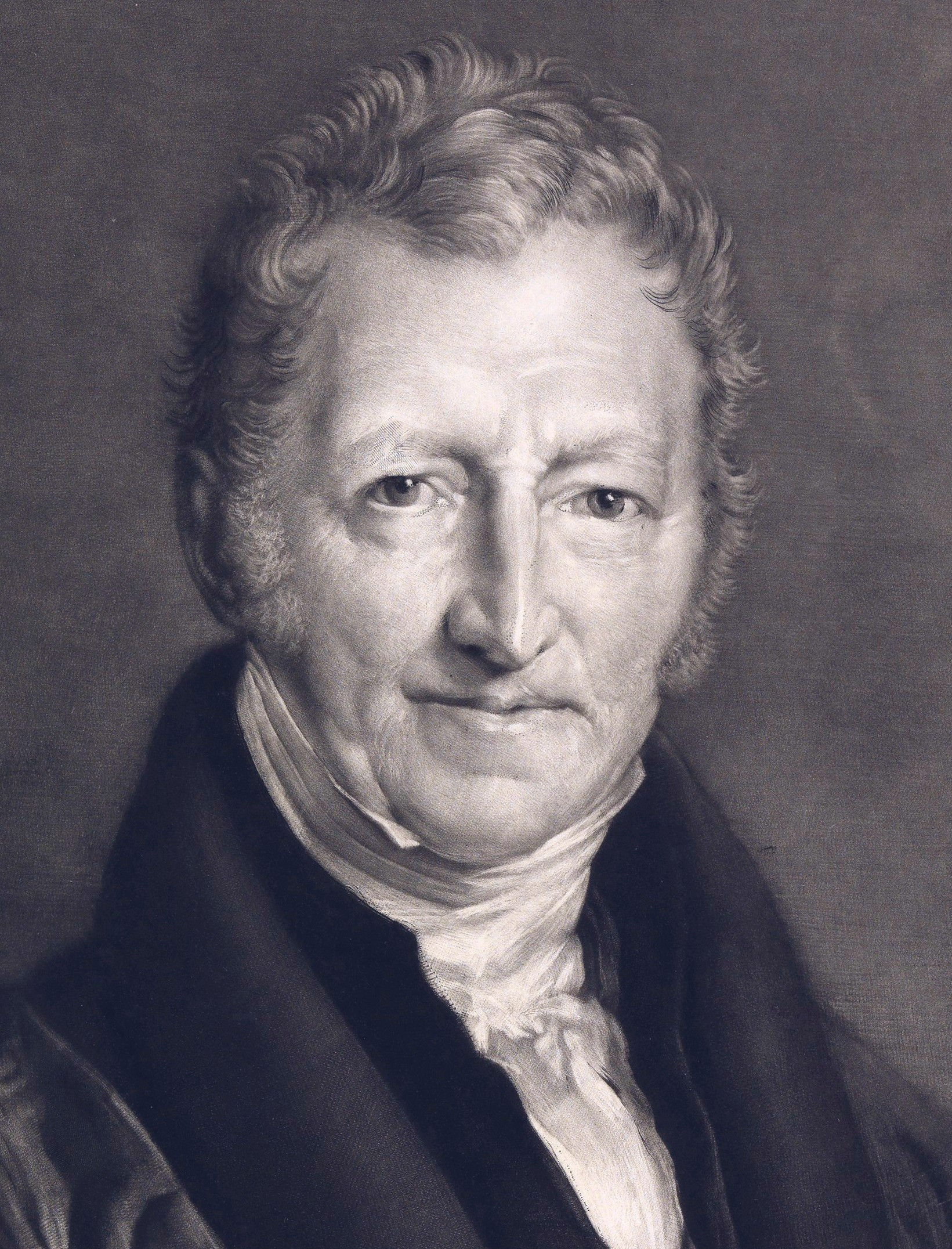
Thomas Malthus

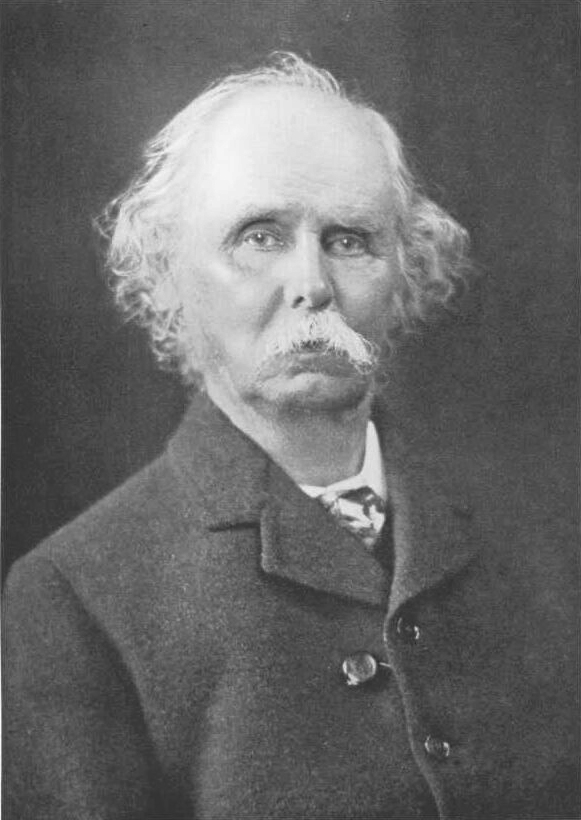
Alfred Marshall

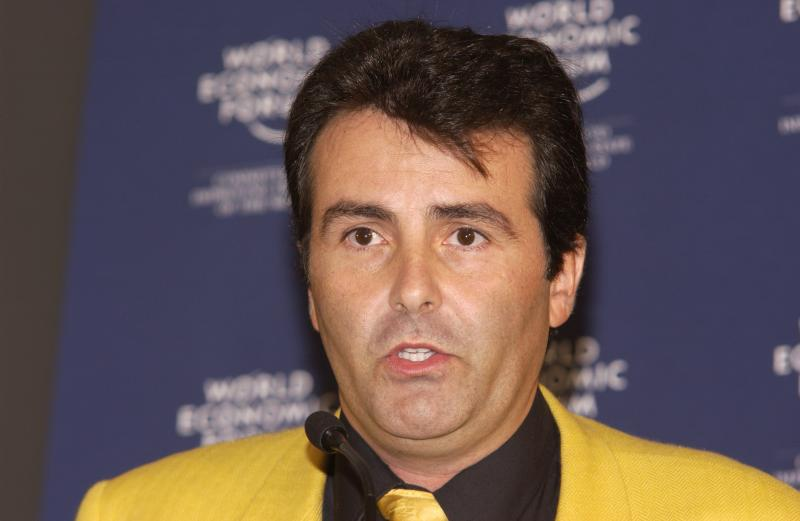
Xavier Sala i Martin

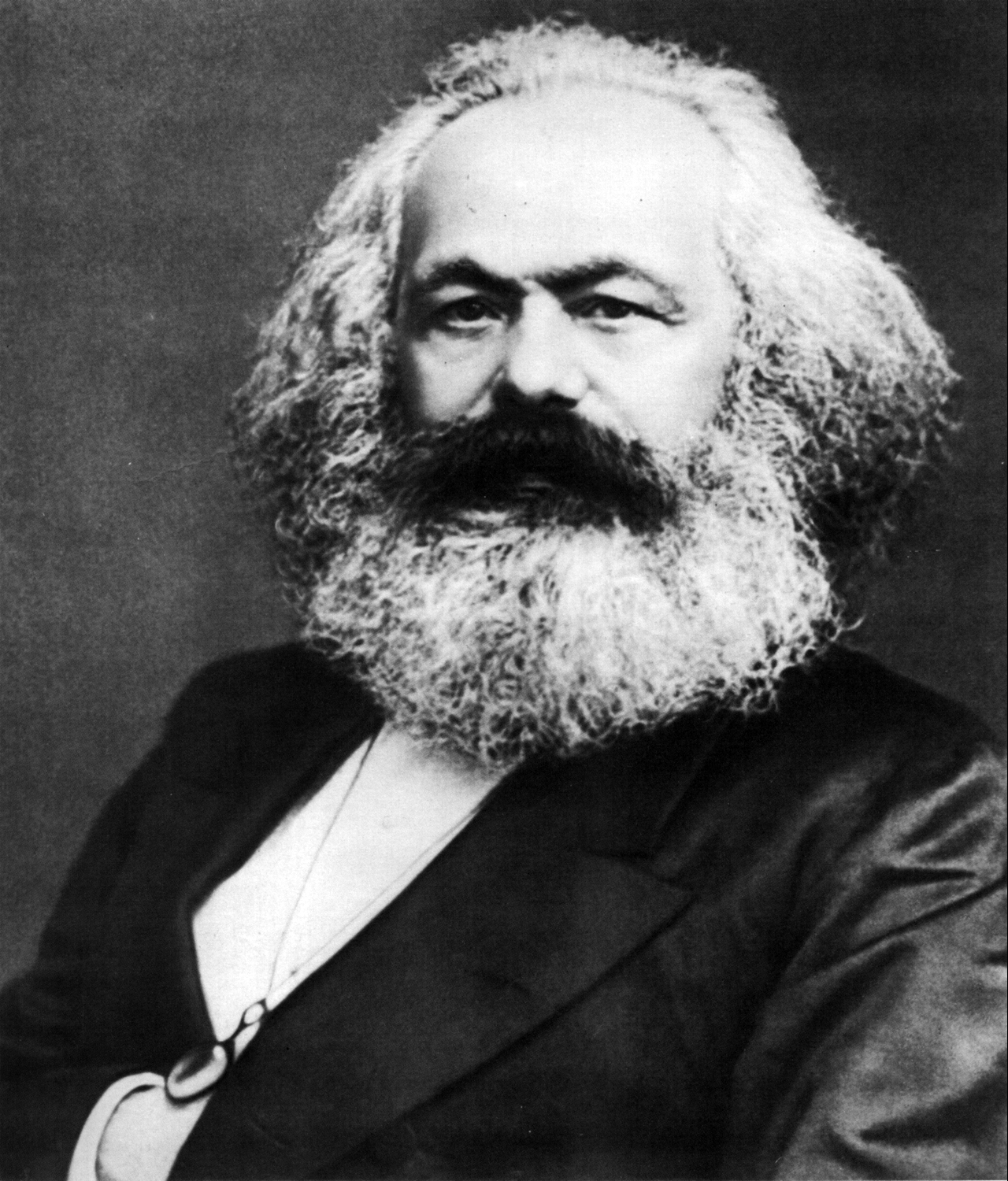
Karl Marx

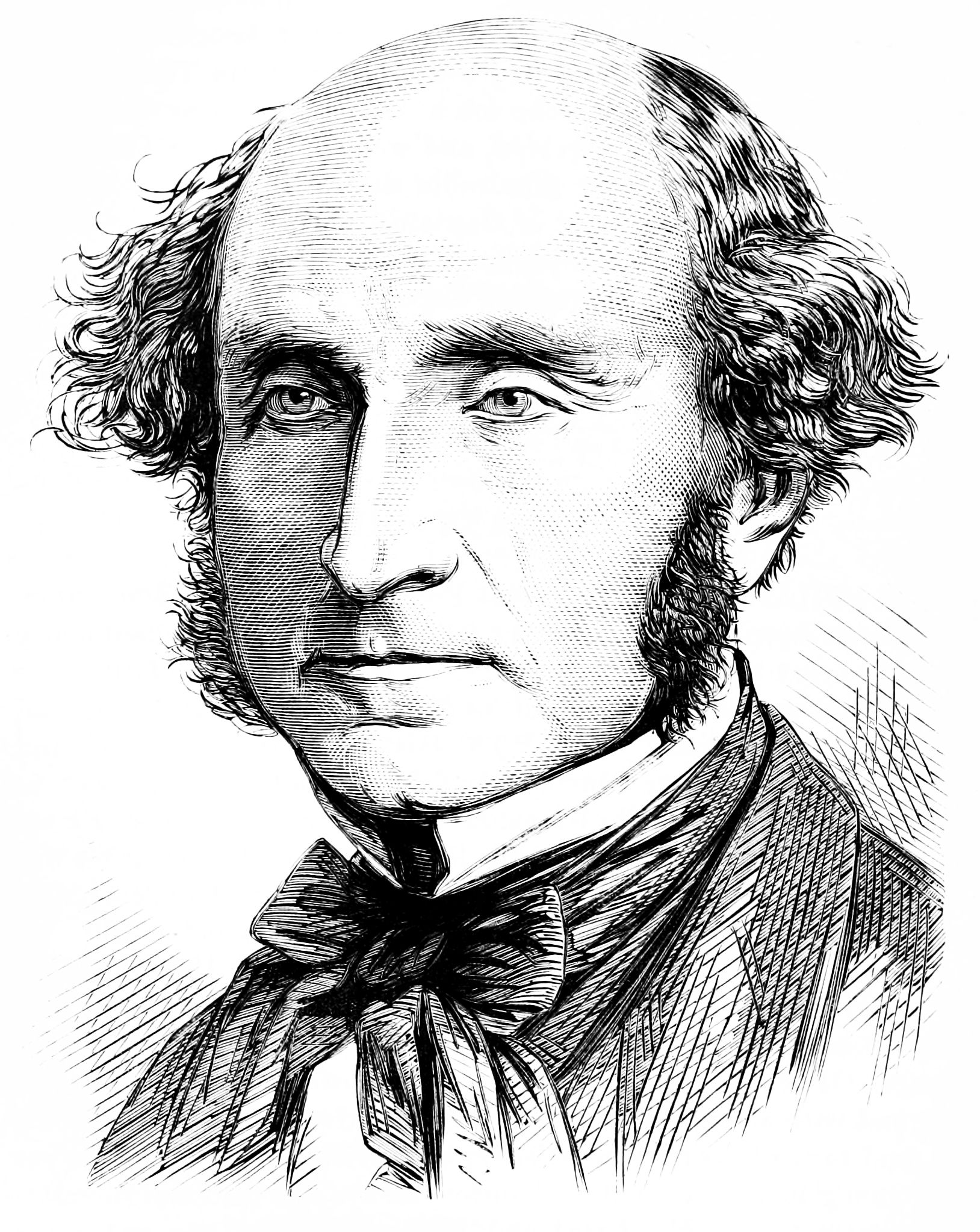
John Stuart Mill

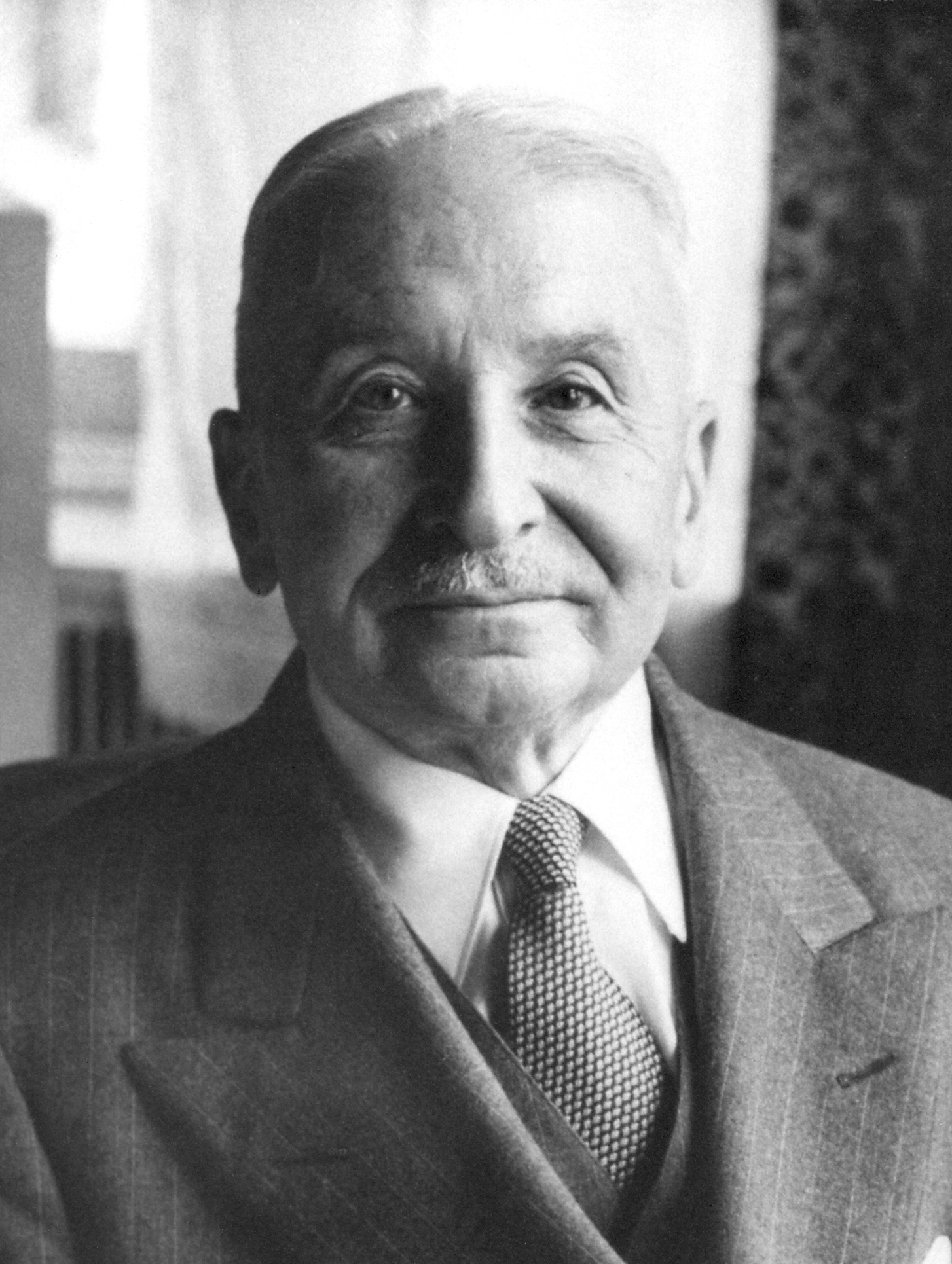
Ludwig von Mises

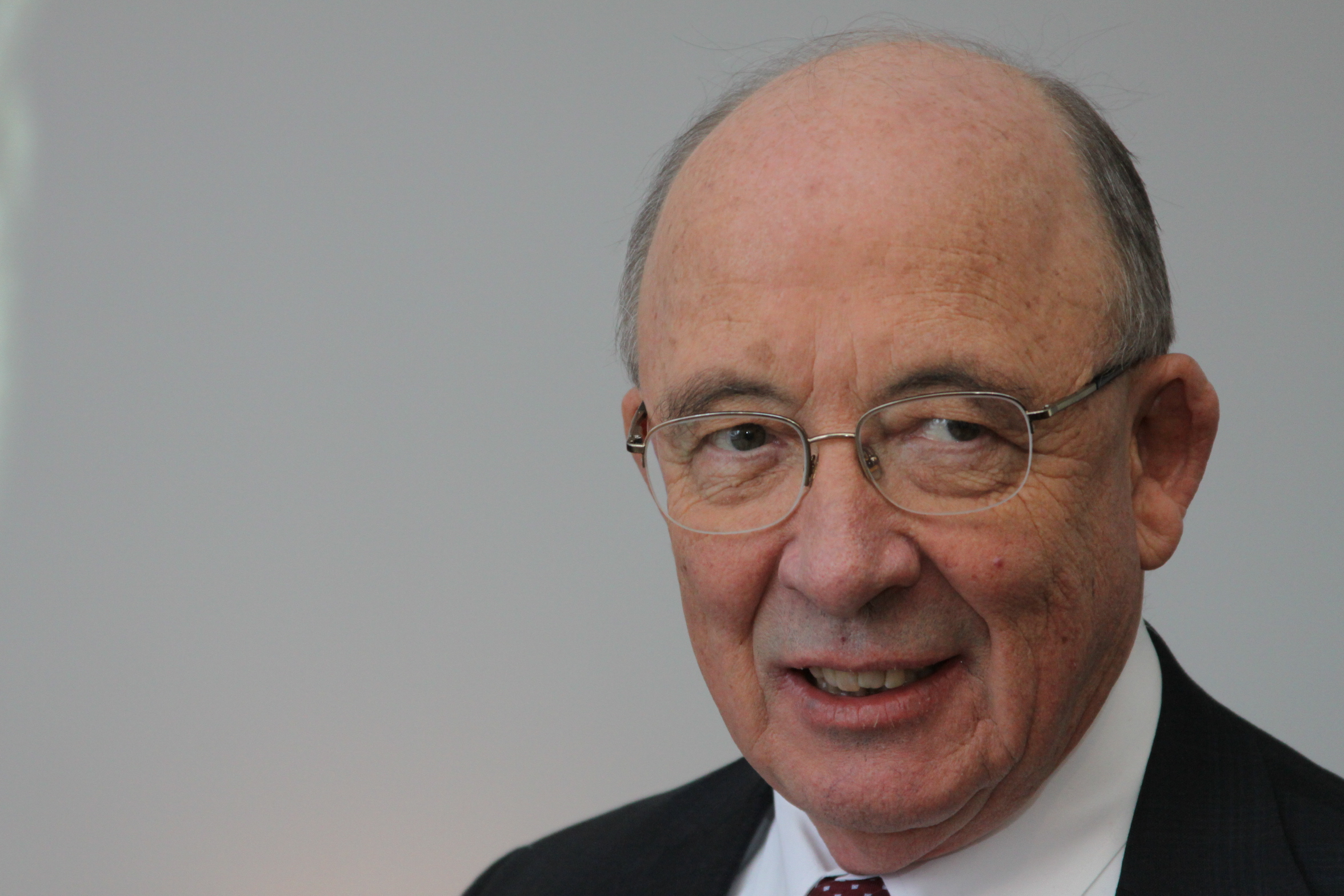
Dale Mortensen

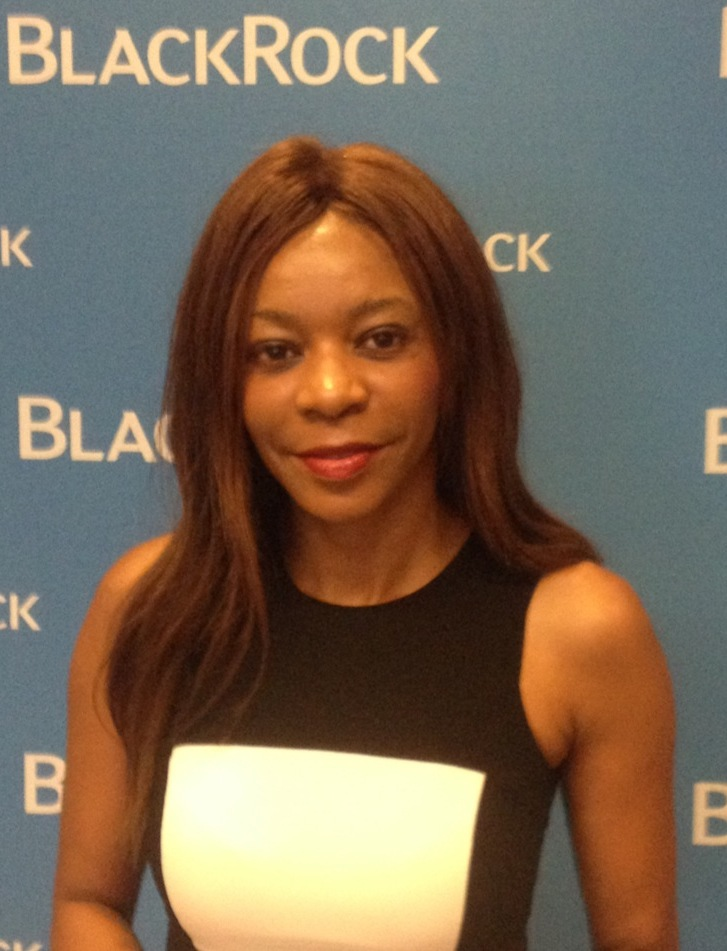
Dambisa Moyo

Alfred Müller-Armack

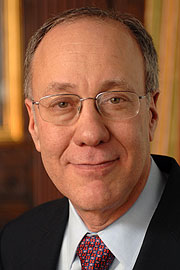
Roger Myerson

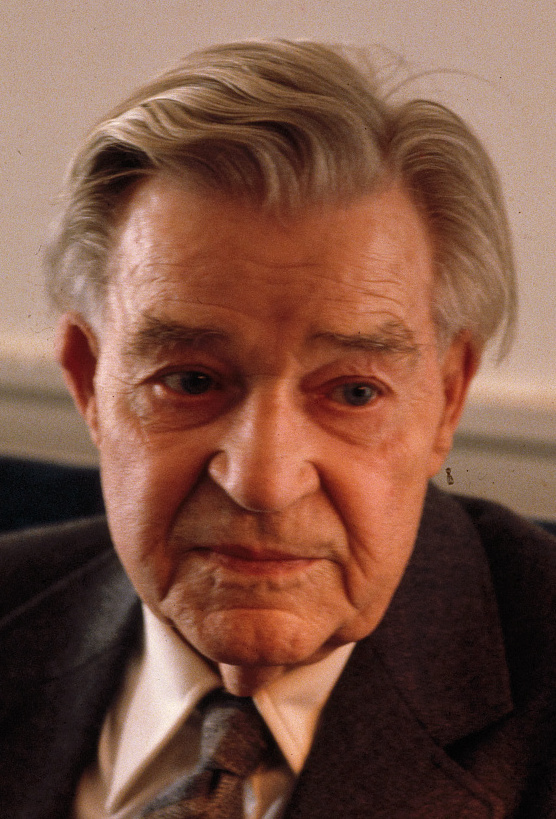
Gunnar Myrdal
- Donald MacDougall (1912–2004), Scottish economist
- Mark J. Machina (born 1954), American economist
- Carlos Manuel Urzúa Macías (born 1955), Mexican academician and economist
- Henry Dunning Macleod (1821–1902), Scottish economist
- Adil Abdul-Mahdi (born 1942), Iraqi economist and vice-president
- Edmond Malinvaud (1923–2015), French economist
- Burton Malkiel (born 1932), American economist and writer on finance
- Thomas Malthus (1766–1834), English political economist and demographer
- Gerard de Malynes (fl. 1585–1627), English foreign trader and government advisor
- Ernest Mandel (1923–1995), Belgian marxist economist
- N. Gregory Mankiw (born 1958), American macroeconomist
- Henry Manne (1928–2015), American economist and academic
- Alan Manning (born 1960), English economist and academic
- Edwin Mansfield (1930–1997), American economist and academic
- Charles Manski (born 1948), American professor of economics
- Mao Yushi (茅于轼;, born 1929), Chinese economist
- Ruy Mauro Marini (1932–1997), Brazilian economist
- Harry Markowitz (1927–2023), American economist
- Karl Marlo (1810–1865), German economist and academic
- Jacob Marschak (1898–1977), American economist
- Alfred Marshall (1842–1924), English neoclassical economist
- Marsh Marshall (born 1953), American economist and hedge-fund manager
- Harriet Martineau (1802–1876), English social theorist
- Karl Marx (1818–1883), German founder of Marxian economics
- Eric Maskin (born 1950), American economist and Nobel laureate
- Mariana Mazzucato (born 1968), Italian–American-British economist and academic
- Jason Gaverick Matheny (living), American expert on artificial intelligence
- Paul Mattick (1904–1981), German social revolutionary
- Richard Maybury (born 1946), American educational economist
- C. M. Mayo (living), American economist and writer
- Preston McAfee (born 1956), American managerial economist
- Bennett McCallum (born 1935), American monetary economist
- Rachel McCleary (living), American economist
- Deirdre McCloskey (born 1942), American economist and academic
- John Ramsey McCulloch (1789–1864), Scottish political economist
- Paul McCulley (born 1957), American economist and business executive
- James McDonald (b. c. 1942), American econometrician
- Daniel McFadden (born 1937), American econometrician
- Richard McKelvey (1944–2002), American political scientist
- Lionel W. McKenzie (1919–2010), American economist
- Warwick McKibbin (born 1957), Australian economist and academic
- David McWilliams (born 1966), Irish economist and writer
- James Meade (1907–1995), English economist and Nobel laureate
- Gardiner Means (1896–1988), American economist
- Ronald L. Meek (1917–1978), New Zealander economist and social scientist
- J. K. Mehta (1901–1980), Indian economist
- Marc Melitz (born 1968), American economist
- Leslie Melville (1902–2002), Australian economist and public servant
- Carl Menger (1840–1921), Austrian economist
- Karl Menger (1902–1985), Austrian/American mathematician
- Stanislav Menshikov (1927–2014), Soviet/Russian economist
- Robert C. Merton (born 1944), American economist and Nobel laureate
- Albert J. Meyer (1919–1983), American economist
- Hugo Richard Meyer (1866–1923), American economist
- John R. Meyer (1927–2009), American transport economist
- Valery Ivanovich Mezhlauk (1893–1938), Soviet planning official
- Leo Michelis (living), Greek/Canadian economist
- Javier Milei (born 1970), Argentinian libertarian economist
- David Miles (born 1959), Welsh/English economist
- Murray Milgate (born 1950), Australian/British economist
- Paul Milgrom (born 1948), American economist
- John Milios (born 1952), Greek economics scholar and social scientist
- John Stuart Mill (1806–1873), English philosopher and political economist
- Merton Miller (1923–2000), American economist and Nobel laureate
- Jacob Mincer (1922–2006), American labor economist
- Hyman Minsky (1919–1996), American economist and professor at Washington University in St. Louis
- James Mirrlees (1936–2018), Scottish economist and Nobel laureate
- Ludwig von Mises (1881–1973), Austrian economist and sociologist
- Frederic Mishkin (born 1951), American economist and academic
- Baidyanath Misra (20th c.), Indian economist and administrator
- Wesley Mitchell (1874–1948), American economist
- Alfred Mitchell-Innes (1864–1950), English economist and diplomat
- Franco Modigliani (1918–2003), Italian/American economist and Nobel laureate
- Robert Moffit (living), American economist and government official
- Herbert Mohring (1928–2012), American transportation economist
- Joel Mokyr (born 1946), Dutch/American economic historian
- Gustave de Molinari (1819–1912), Belgian political economist
- Solita Monsod (born 1940), Philippines economist and writer
- John Hardman Moore (born 1954), English economic theorist
- Jonathan Morduch (born 1963), American economist and public service expert
- Peter Morici (born 1948), American economist
- Michio Morishima (1923–2004), Japanese economist
- Stephen Morris (living), American game theorist
- Dale Mortensen (1939–2014), American economist and Nobel laureate
- Warren Mosler (born 1949), American economist and hedge-fund manager
- Rowland Percy Moss (born 1928), English development economist
- Natalie Moszkowska (1886–1968), Polish economist
- Hans Mottek (1910–1993), German economic historian
- David C. Mowery (living), American economist
- Dambisa Moyo (born 1969), Zambian economist
- Anu Muhammad (born 1956), Bangladeshi economist
- Sendhil Mullainathan (b. c. 1973), Indian/American economist and academic
- Alfred Müller-Armack (1901–1978), German economist who coined the term "social market economy"
- Thomas Mun (1571–1641), English writer on economics
- Mohan Munasinghe (living), Sri Lankan economist and physicist
- Robert Mundell (1932–2021), Canadian economist and academic
- Karthik Muralidharan (born 1975), Indian/American economist
- Richard Murnane (born 1945), American economist
- Kevin J. Murphy (born 1957), American finance academic
- Kevin M. Murphy (born 1958), American economist
- Robert P. Murphy (born 1976), American economist
- Richard Musgrave (1910–2007), American economist and public finance theorist
- Michael Mussa (1944–2012), American economist and academic
- John Muth (1930–2005), American economist
- Bingu wa Mutharika (1934–2012), Malawi economist and politician
- Margaret Good Myers (1899–1988), American economist
- Stewart Myers (born 1940), American financial economist
- Roger Myerson (born 1951), American economist and academic
- Alva Myrdal (1902–1986), Swedish sociologist and Nobel laureate
- Gunnar Myrdal (1898–1987), Swedish economist and sociologist

== N ==
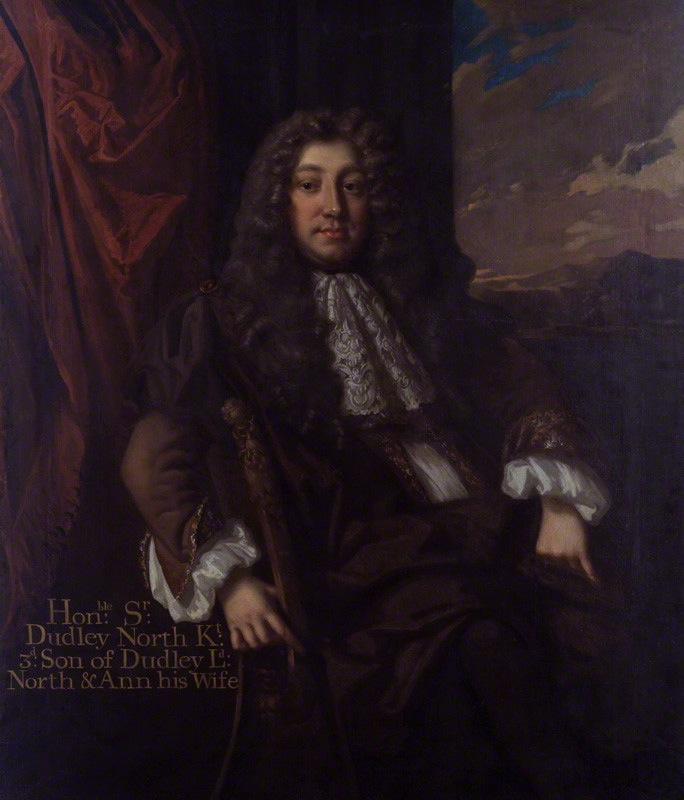
Dudley North

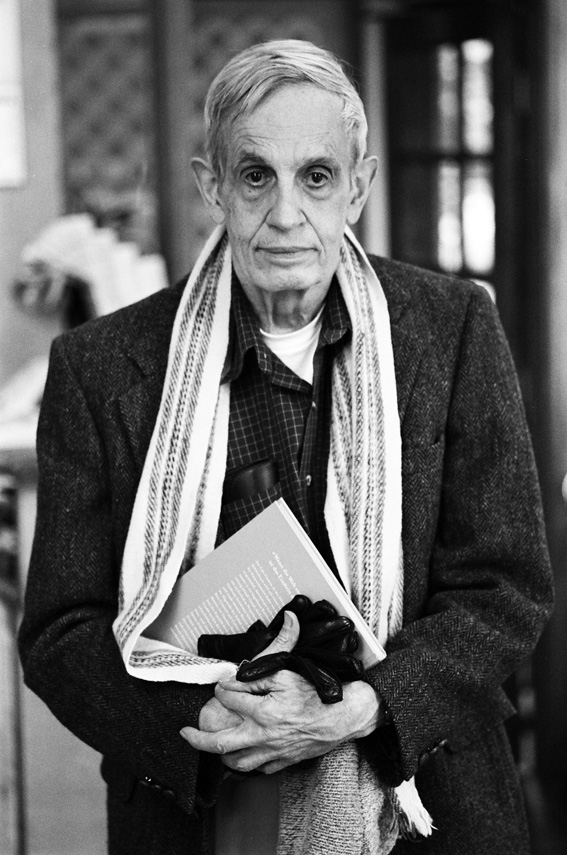
John Forbes Nash
- John Forbes Nash Jr. (1928–2015), American mathematician and Nobel laureate
- Scott Nearing (1883–1983), American radical economist and educator
- Antonio Negri (1933–2023), Italian political philosopher
- Richard Nelson (born 1930), American evolutionary economist and academic
- Nikolay Nenovsky (born 1963), Bulgarian/French economist
- Marc Nerlove (born 1933), American economist
- John von Neumann (1903–1957), Hungarian/American mathematician and economist
- David Neumark (born 1959), American economist and academic
- Otto Neurath (1882–1945), Austrian political economist, sociologist and philosopher of science
- David Newbery (born 1943), English applied economist
- Francis William Newman (1805–1897), English moral philosopher
- Stephen Nickell (born 1944), English economist and academic
- Peter Nijkamp (born 1946), Dutch economist
- Yew-Kwang Ng (黄有光, born 1942), Malaysian/Australian welfare economist
- William A. Niskanen (1933–2011), American economist and adviser
- William Nordhaus (1941–2026), American economist and climate-change expert
- Montagu Norman, 1st Baron Norman (1871–1950), English central banker
- Douglass North (1920–2015), American economic historian
- Dudley North (1641–1691), English merchant and economist
- Robert Nozick (1938–2002), American philosopher
- Oscar Nuccio (1931–2004), Italian economic historian

== O ==
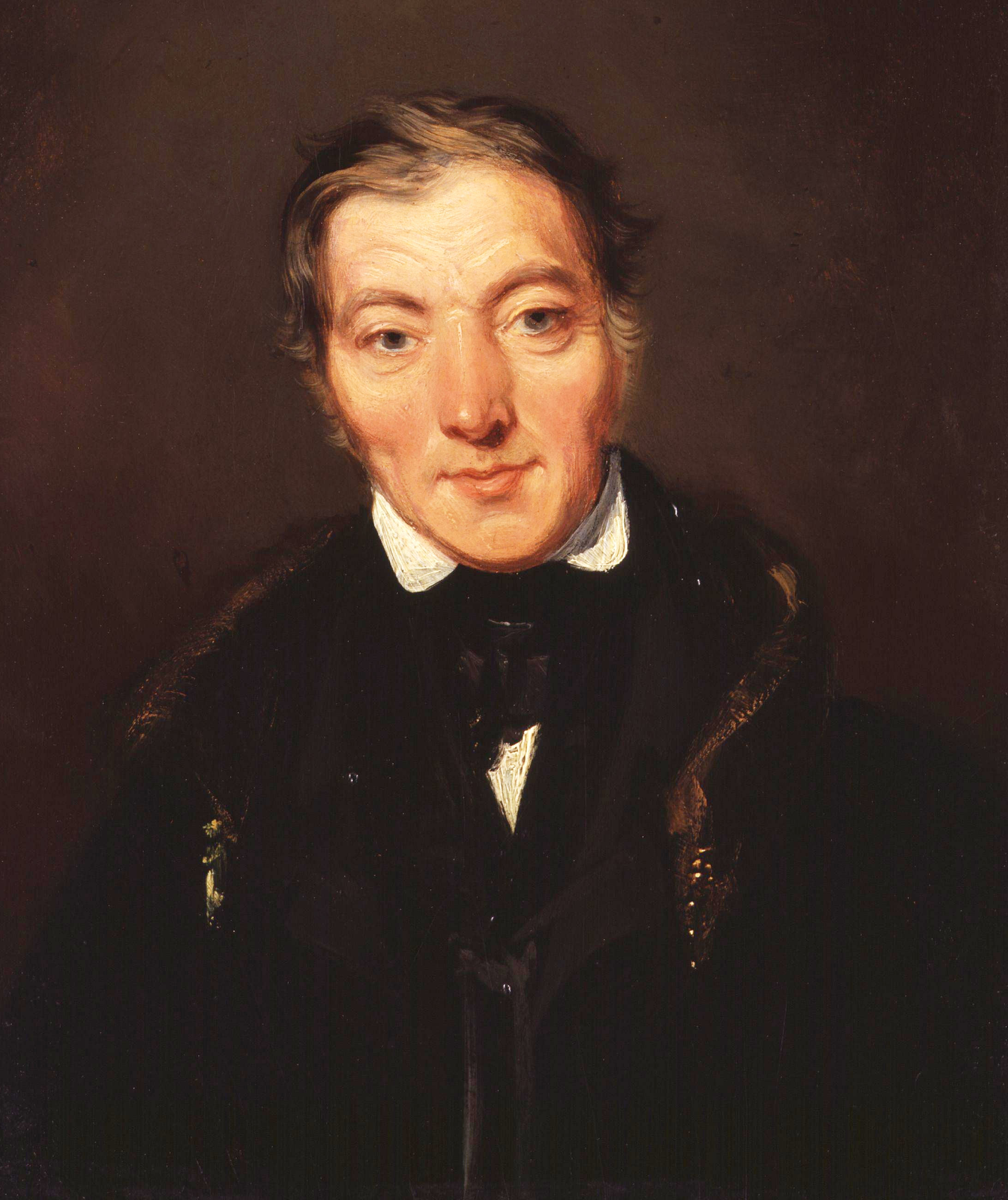
Robert Owen

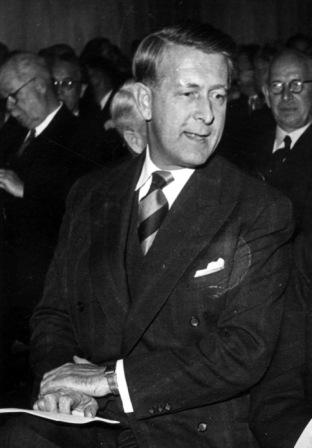
Bertil Ohlin

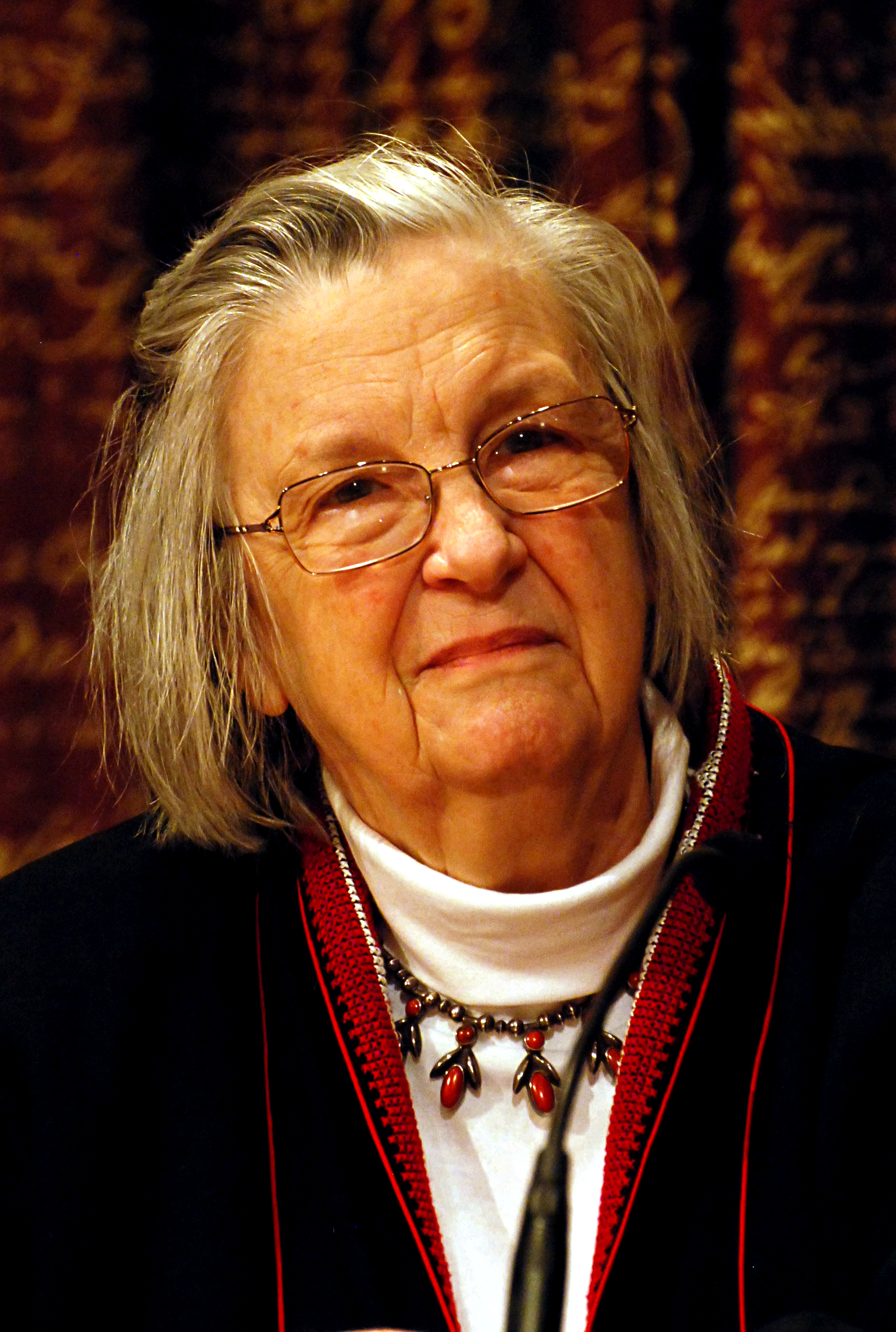
Elinor Ostrom
- William Oakland (1939–2007), American economist and academic
- Maurice Obstfeld (born 1952), American economist and academic
- Fred Oelßner (1903–1977), German economist and politician
- William Ogilvie (1736–1819), Scottish academic
- Sharyn O'Halloran (living), American political scientist and economist
- Bertil Ohlin (1899–1979), Swedish economist and politician
- Walter Oi (1929–2013), American economist and professor at University of Rochester
- Nobuo Okishio (置塩信雄, 1927–2003), Japanese Marxian economist
- Ngozi Okonjo-Iweala (born 1954), Nigerian/American economist and Director-General of the World Trade Organization
- Arthur Melvin Okun (1928–1980), American economist and adviser
- Mancur Olson (1932–1998), American economist and political scientist
- Redvers Opie (1900–1984), English/Mexican economist
- Anna Gifty Opoku-Agyeman (born 1996), Ghanaian-American activist and CEO of the Sadie Collective
- Nicole Oresme (c. 1320–1382), French philosopher
- Peter R. Orszag (born 1968), American financial adviser
- Claus Peter Ortlieb (1947–2019), German political economist and mathematician
- Elinor Ostrom (1933–2012), American political economist and Nobel laureate
- Konstantin Ostrovityanov (1892–1969), Soviet economist and academic
- Andrew Oswald (living), Australian/British economist and behavioural scientist
- Nildo Ouriques (born 1959), Brazilian economist and academic
- Robert Owen (1771–1858), Welsh social reformer

== P ==
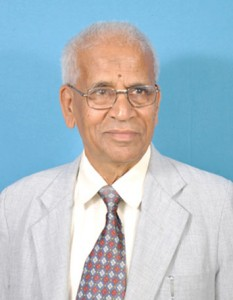
V. R. Panchamukhi

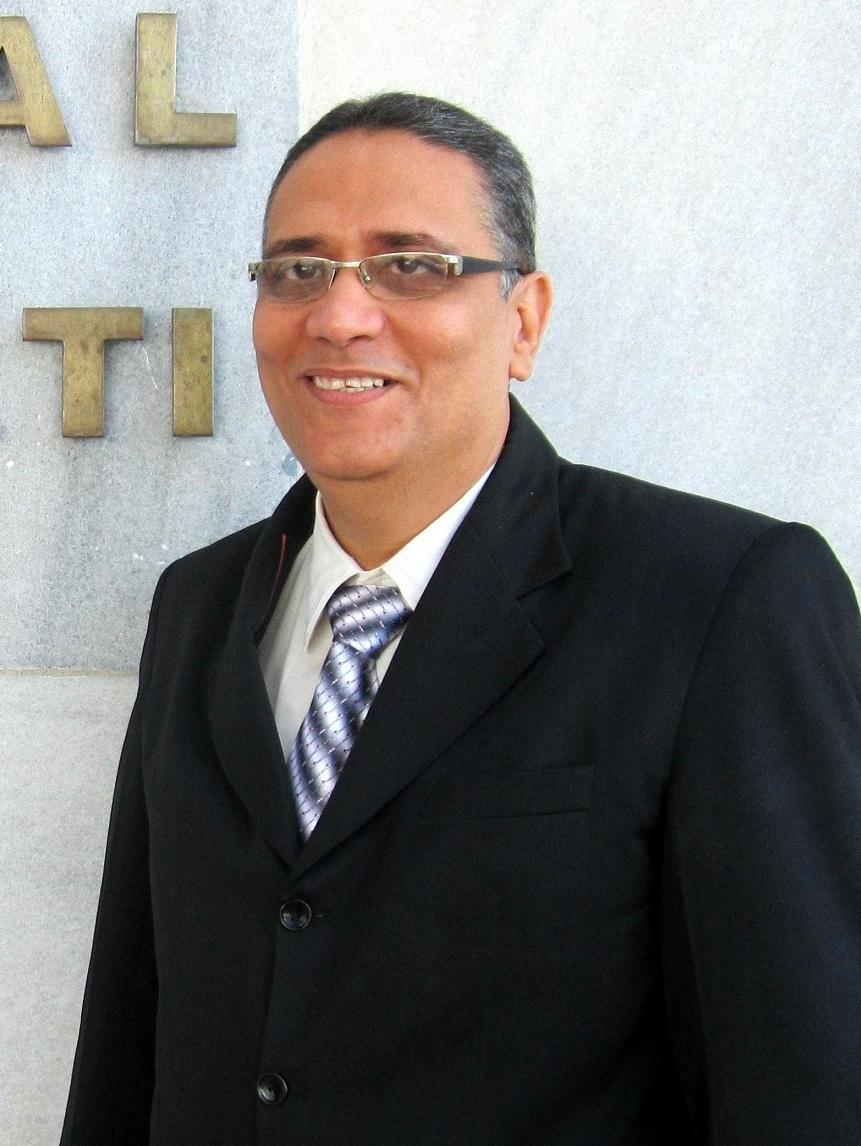
Javier Perez-Capdevila

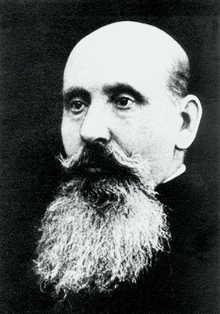
Heinrich Pesch

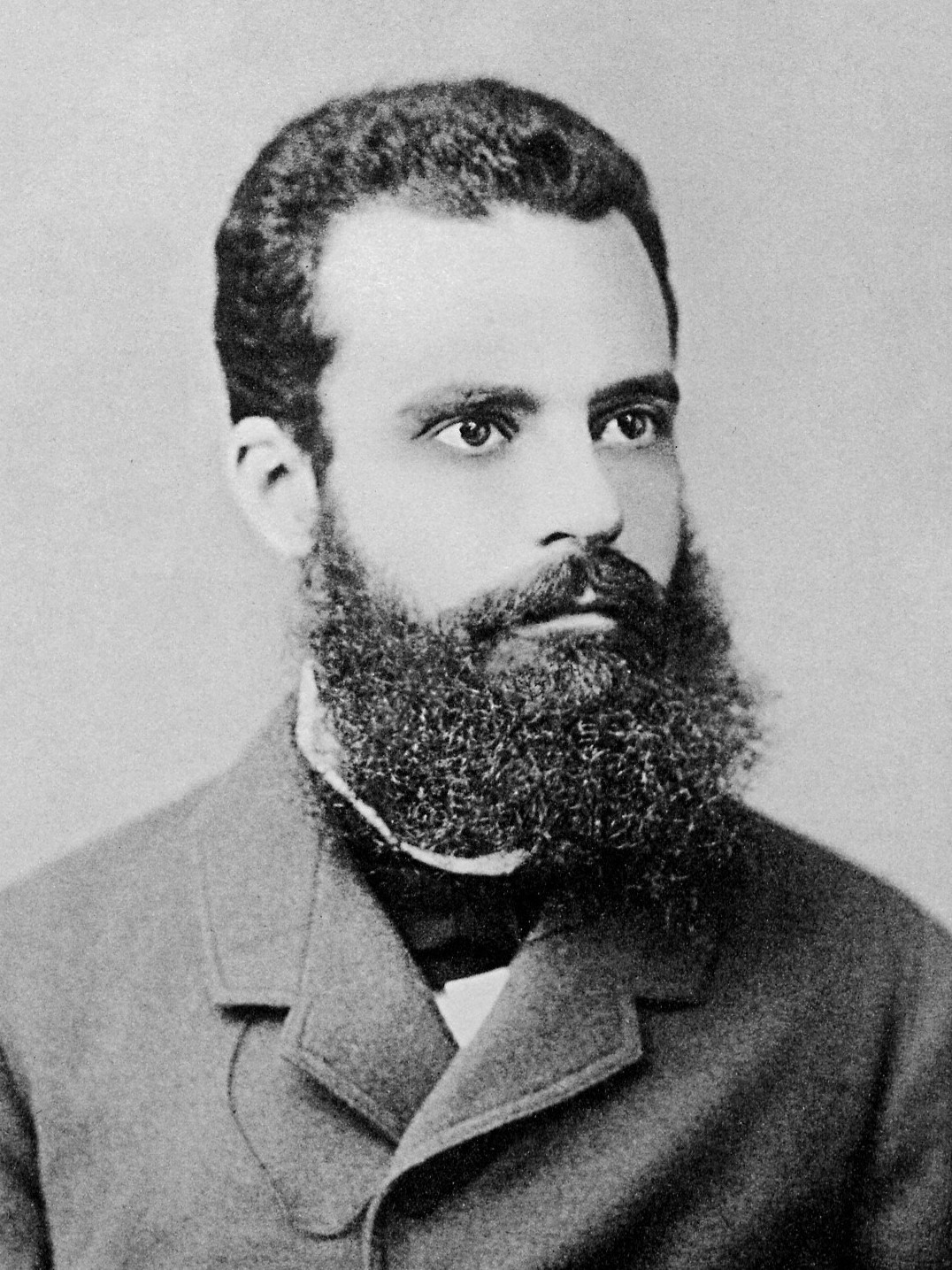
Vilfredo Pareto

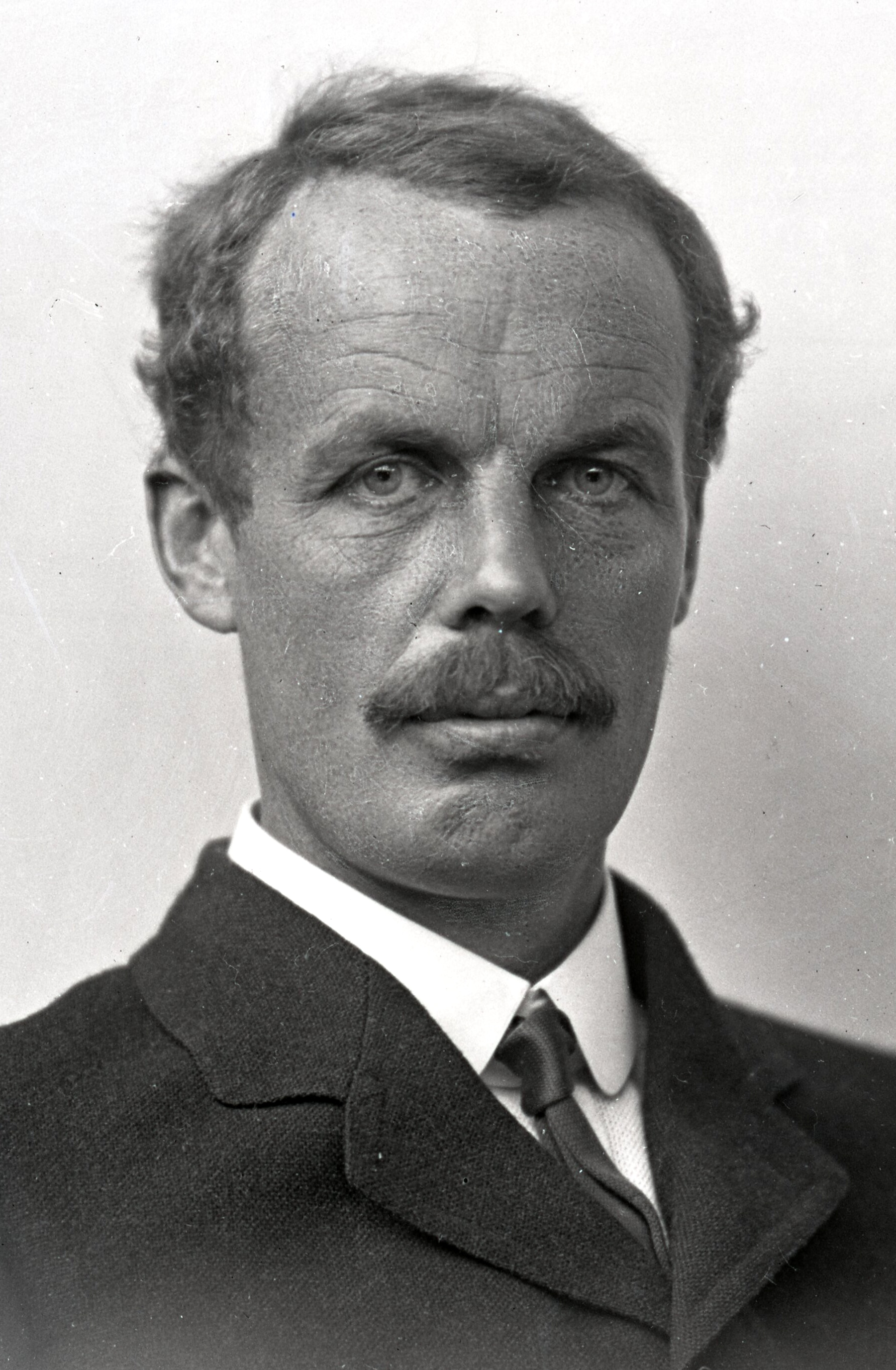
Arthur Cecil Pigou

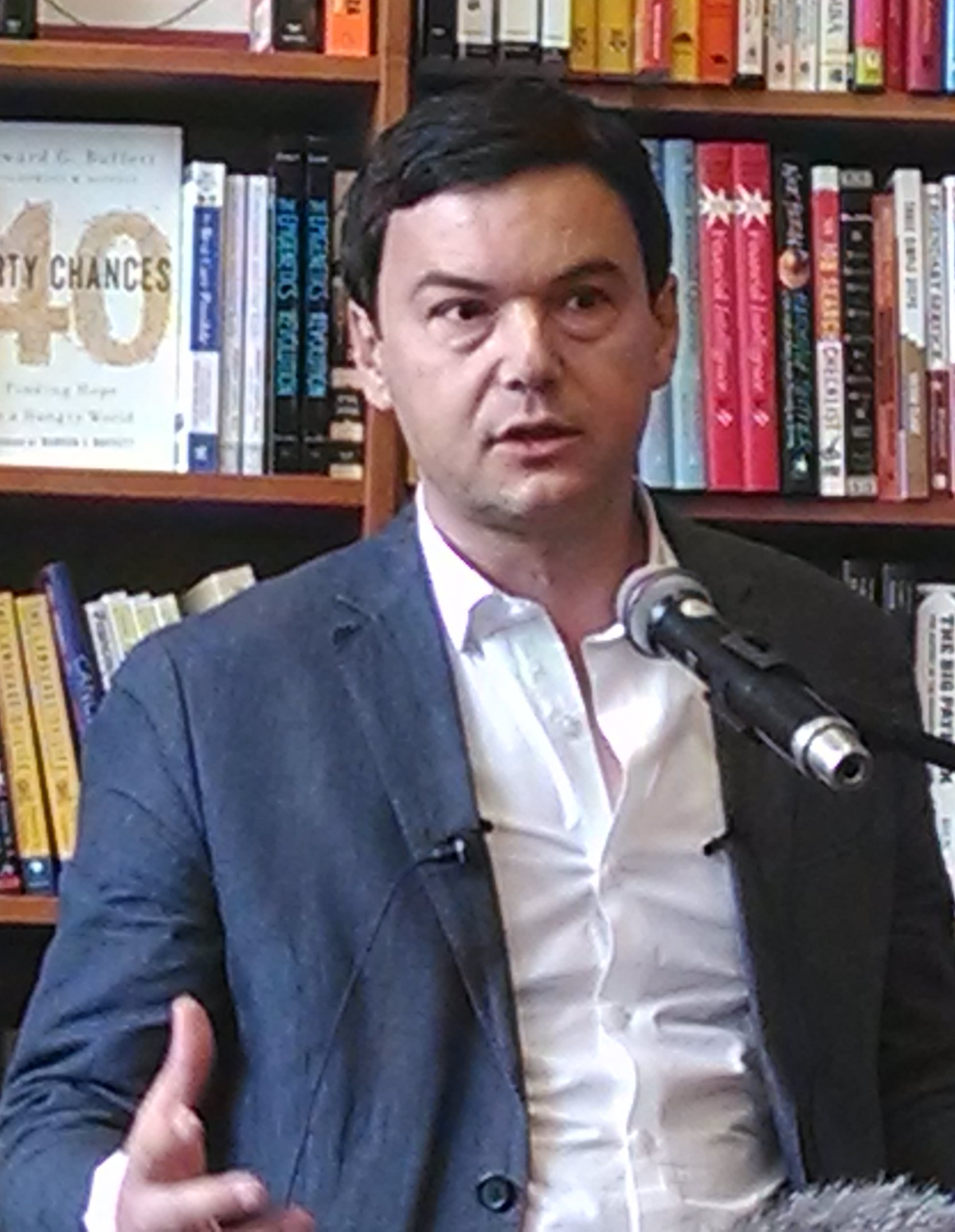
Thomas Piketty

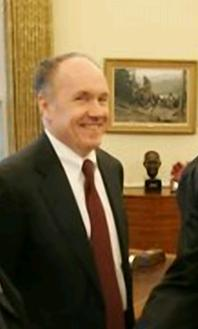
Edward C. Prescott

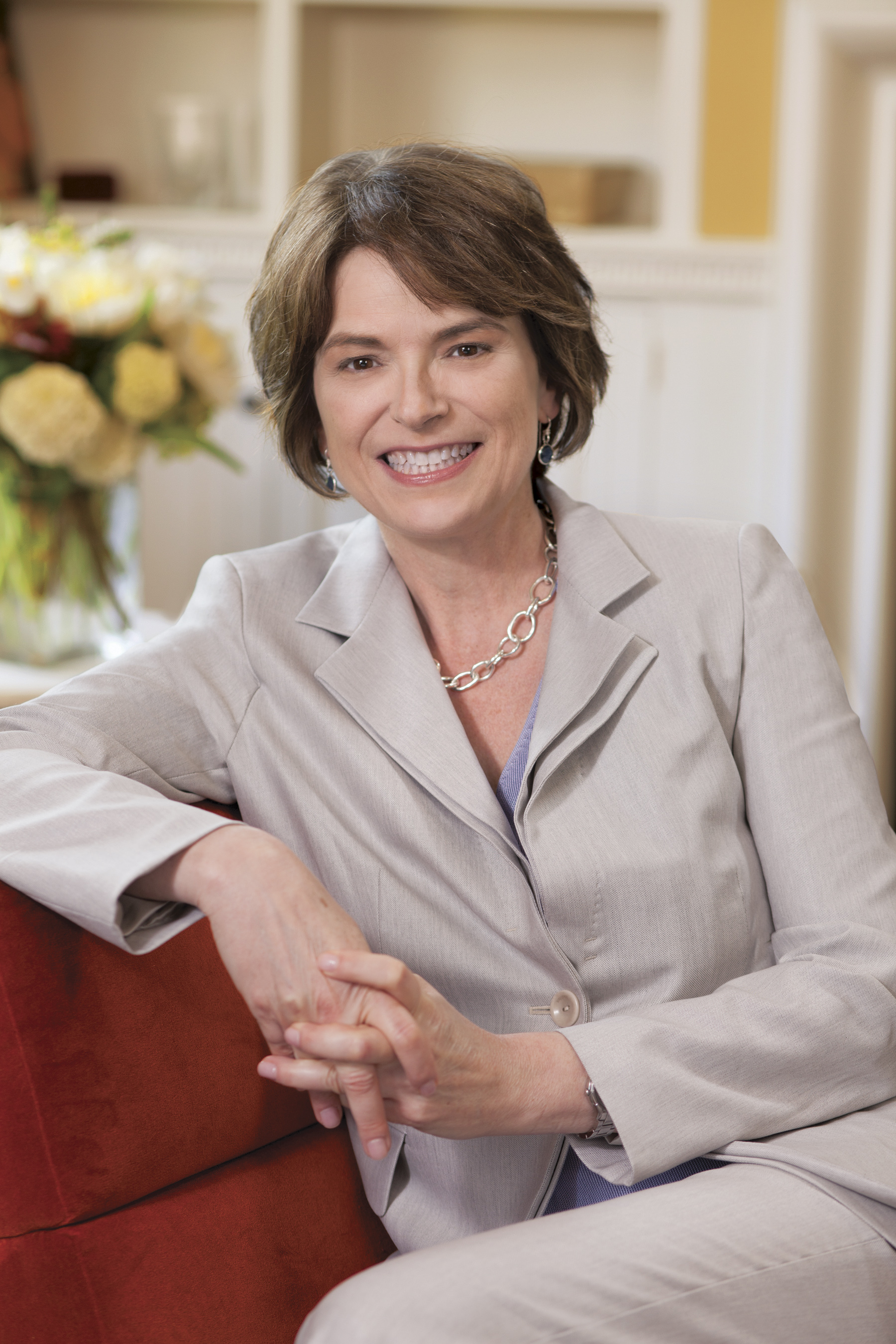
Christina Paxson
- Krishna Palepu (born 1954), American economist and business manager
- Giancarlo Pallavicini (born 1931), Italian economist and Soviet adviser
- V. R. Panchamukhi (born 1936), Indian economist and scholar
- Thomas Palfrey (born 1953), American economist and political scientist
- Yadav Prasad Pant (1928–2007), Nepalese economist and politician
- Maffeo Pantaleoni (1857–1924), Italian economist
- Vilfredo Pareto (1848–1923), Italian engineer and economist
- Manuel V. Pangilinan (born 1946), Philippines business executive
- Jacques Parizeau (1930–2015), Canadian economist and politician
- Luigi Pasinetti (1930–2023), Italian economist
- Frédéric Passy (1822–1912), French economist and pacifist
- I. G. Patel (1924–2005), Indian economist and central bank governor
- Prabhat Patnaik (born 1945), Indian economist and political commentator
- Utsa Patnaik (born 1945), Indian economist
- William Paterson (1658–1719), Scottish trade and banker
- Don Patinkin (1922–1995), American/Israeli monetary economist
- Christina Paxson (born 1960), American economist
- Alan T. Peacock (1922-2014), British economist
- Lasse Heje Pedersen (born 1972), Danish financial economist
- Peter Pedroni, American econometrician
- Edith Penrose (1914–1996), American/British economist
- Émile and Isaac Péreire (1800–1875 and 1806–1880), French financiers
- Carlota Perez (born 1939), Venezuelan/British specialist in socio-economic development
- Javier Perez-Capdevila (born 1963), Cuban mathematician
- Torsten Persson (born 1954), Swedish economist
- Pierre Le Pesant, sieur de Boisguilbert (1646–1714), French lawmaker and theorist
- M. Hashem Pesaran (born 1946), Iranian/British economist
- Heinrich Pesch (1854–1926), German Jesuit, economist, and philosopher
- Wolfgang Pesendorfer, American economist
- Pierre Pestieau (born 1943), Belgian economist
- Maurice Peston, Baron Peston (1931–2016), English economist and politician
- Robert Peston (born 1960), English writer on economics
- Douglas Peters (1930–2016), Canadian banker and economist
- William Petty (1623–1687), English economist and scientist
- Edmund Phelps (1933–2026), American economist and Nobel laureate
- Thomas Philippon (born 1974), French/American economist and finance professor
- Peter C. B. Phillips (born 1948), New Zealand/Singapore econometrician
- William Phillips (1914–1975), New Zealand/English economist
- Arthur Cecil Pigou (1877–1959), English welfare economist
- Thomas Piketty (born 1971), French economist
- Michael J. Piore (born 1940), American economist and professor
- Christopher A. Pissarides (born 1948), Cypriot economist
- Arnold Plant (1898–1978), English economist
- Plato (Platon, 428/427 or 424/423 – 348/347 BC), Greek philosopher
- Steven Plaut (1951–2017), Israeli economist
- Oleksiy Plotnikov (born 1965), Ukrainian economist
- Charles Plott (born 1938), American economist
- Serhiy Podolynsky (1850–1891), Ukrainian ecological economist
- Karl Polanyi (1886–1964), Austro-Hungarian/Canadian economic historian and political economist
- Michael Polanyi (1891–1976), Hungarian/British polymath
- Robert Pollin (born 1950), American economist
- Yuri Poluneev (born 1956), Soviet/Ukrainian international economist
- Dina Pomeranz (born 1977), Swiss economist
- Jean-Pierre Ponssard (born 1946), French economist
- Gale Pooley (living), American economist, professor, and author
- Arden Pope (b. c. 1954), American environmental economist
- Michael Porter (born 1947), American business economist
- Richard Portes (living), American/British economist
- Arturo C. Porzecanski (born 1949), Uruguayan/American economist
- Richard Posner (1939–2026), American jurist and economist
- James M. Poterba (born 1958), American economist
- Bernard van Praag (born 1939), Dutch welfare economist
- John W. Pratt (born 1931), American business economist
- Edward C. Prescott (born 1940), American economist and Nobel laureate
- Steven Pressman (born 1952), American economist
- Clyde V. Prestowitz Jr. (born 1941), American labor economist
- Raúl Prebisch (1901–1986), Argentinian structural economist
- Yevgeni Preobrazhensky (1886–1937), Soviet/Russian economist, revolutionary, and politician
- Cuno Pümpin (born 1939), Swiss economist and entrepreneur

== Q ==
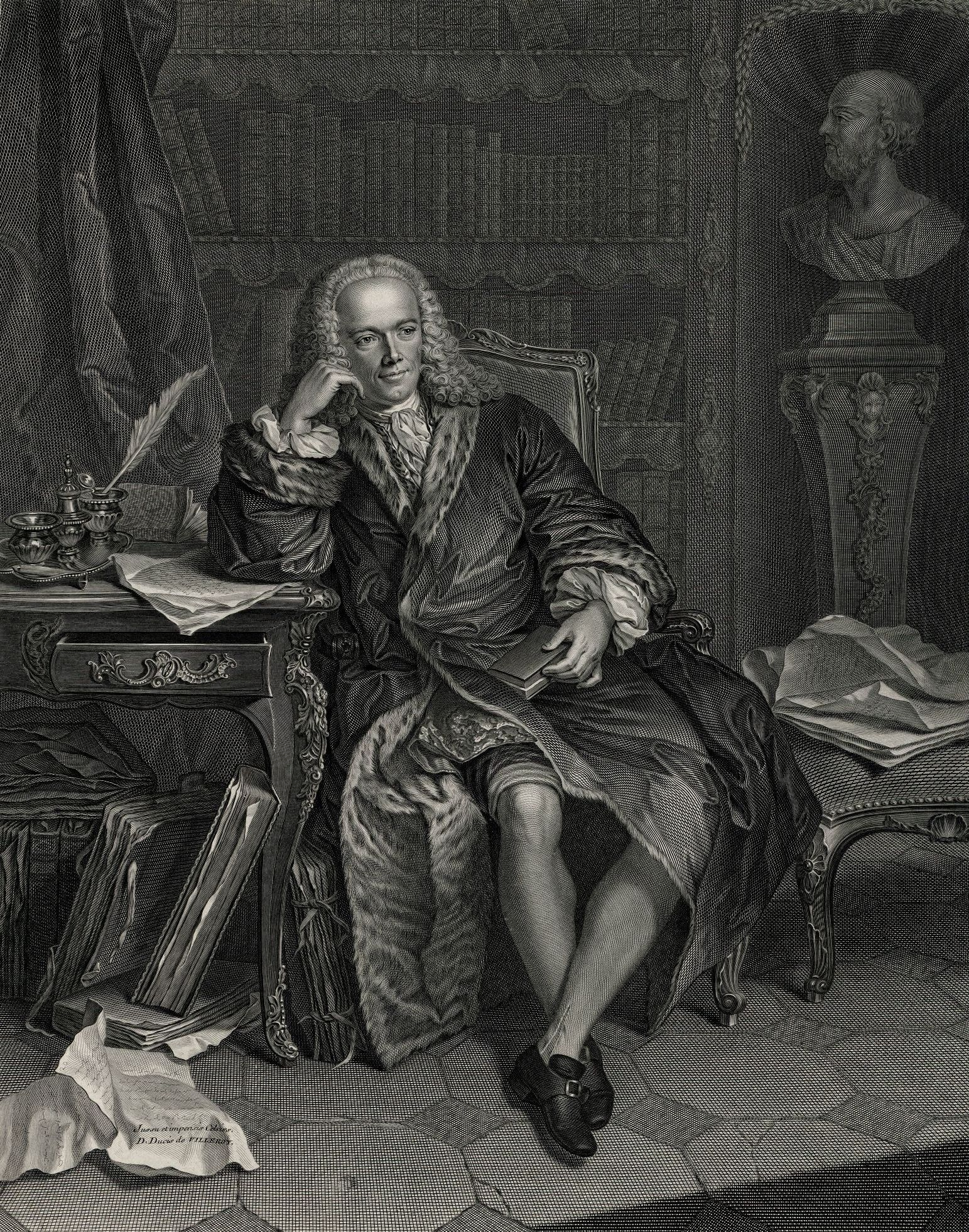
François Quesnay
- Guy Quaden (born 1945), Belgian economist and central bank governor
- Danny Quah (柯成兴, born 1958), Singapore development economist
- François Quesnay (1694–1774), French economist
- John Quiggin (born 1956), Australian economist and government adviser

== R ==
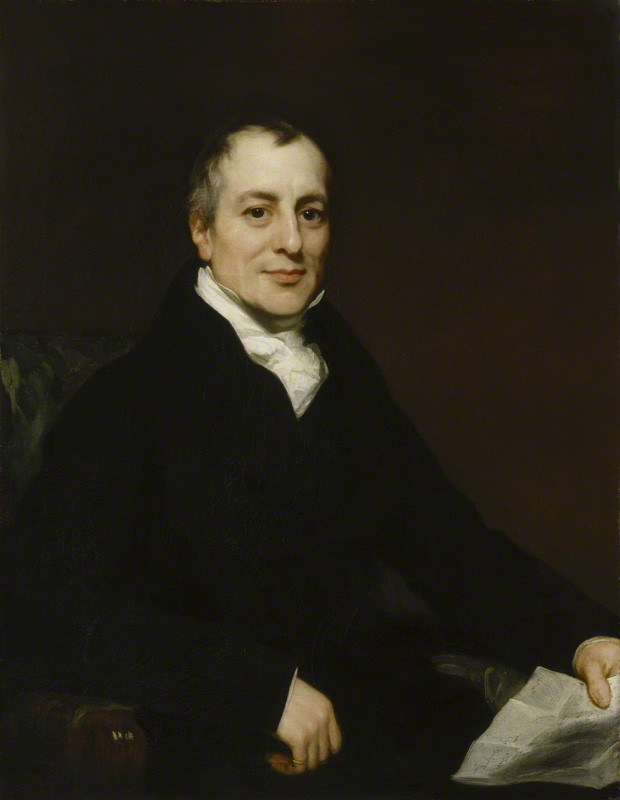
David Ricardo

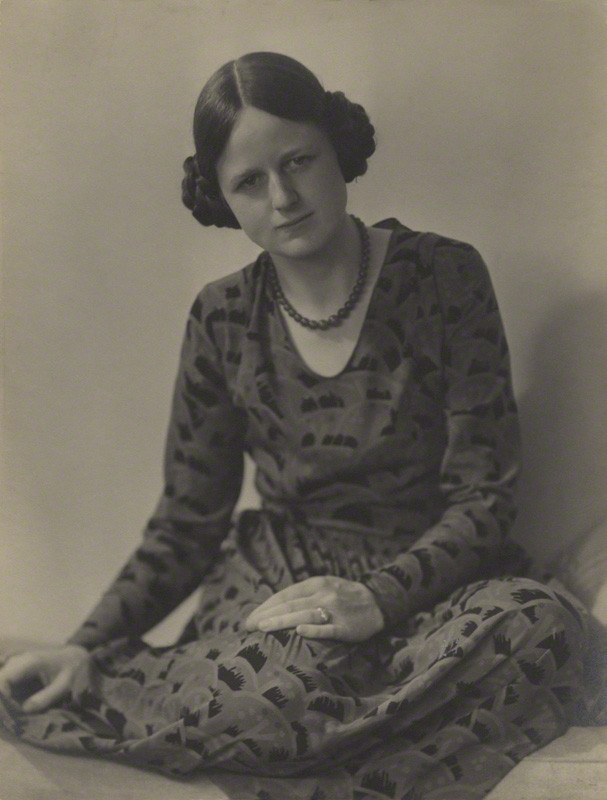
Joan Robinson

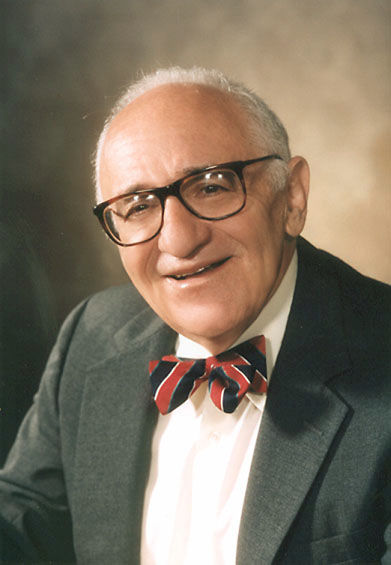
Murray Rothbard

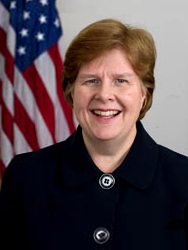
Christina Romer

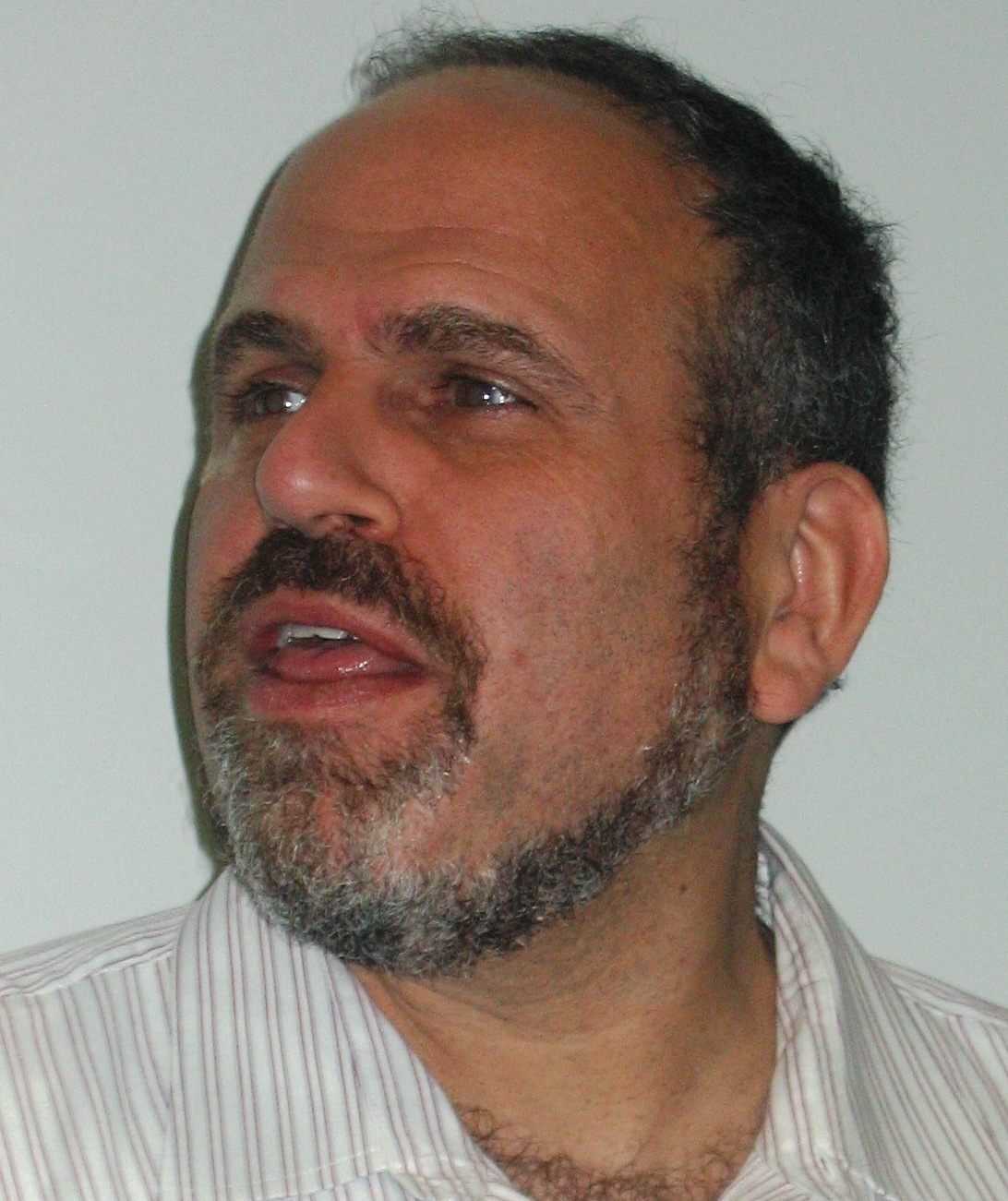
Matthew Rabin
- Matthew Rabin (born 1963), American behavioral economist
- Roy Radner (1927–2022), American micro-economist
- John Rae (1796–1872), Scottish/Canadian economist
- Richard W. Rahn (born 1942), American economist
- Raghuram Rajan (born 1963), Indian economist
- Mihir Rakshit (born 1936), Indian economist
- Rogelio Ramírez de la O (living), Mexican economist
- Frank Plumpton Ramsey (1903–1930), English mathematician and economist
- Ajit Ranade (living), Indian economist and political analyst
- Leonard Rapping (1934–1991), American economist and government adviser
- Martin Ravallion (1952–2022), Australian economist
- Debra Ray (born 1957), Indian/American development economist
- Daniel Raymond (1786–1849), American political economist
- John Rawls (1921–2002), American philosopher
- Riccardo Realfonzo (born 1964), Italian economist
- Ralph Recto (born 1964), Philippines economist and politician
- Daniel Rees American economist and professor at Charles III University of Madrid
- Robert Reich (born 1946), American economist and commentator
- Helmut Reichelt (born 1939), German economist, sociologist and philosopher
- Carmen Reinhart (born 1955), Cuban/American economist and academic
- Ricardo Reis (born 1988), Portuguese/British economist
- George Reisman (born 1937), American economist and academic
- Philip J. Reny (living), Canadian/American economist
- Stephen Resnick (1938–2013), American economist
- David Ricardo (1772–1823), English political economist
- Matthew Richardson, American economist
- Frank-Jürgen Richter (born 1967), German economist and entrepreneur
- Jeremy Rifkin (born 1945), American economist and social theorist
- Alice Rivlin (1931–2019), American economist and budget official
- Lionel Robbins (1898–1984), English economist
- Donald John Roberts (born 1945), Canadian/American economist
- Paul Craig Roberts (born 1939), American economist
- Russ Roberts (born 1954), American economist and broadcaster
- Denis Robertson (1890–1963), English economist and academic
- Abraham Robinson (1918–1974), German/American mathematician
- Austin Robinson (1897–1993), English economist and academic
- Joan Robinson (1903–1983), English economist
- Johann Karl Rodbertus (1805–1875), German economist and political theorist
- Dani Rodrik (born 1957), Turkish/American economist
- John Roemer (born 1945), American economist and political scientist
- Kenneth Rogoff (born 1953), American economist
- Gérard Roland (born 1954), Belgian economist
- Eric Roll (1907–2005), Austro-Hungarian/English economist and public servant
- Richard Roll (born 1939), American economist and finance expert
- Christina Romer (born 1958), American economist and policy adviser
- David Romer (born 1958), American economist and academic
- Paul Romer (born 1955), American economist and business academic
- Alessandro Roncaglia (born 1947), Italian economist
- Ivar Rooth (1888–1972), Swedish lawyer and economist
- Raymond de Roover (1904–1972), Belgian/American economic historian
- Harvey S. Rosen (born 1949), American economist and public-finance adviser
- Henry Rosovsky (1927–2022), German/American economist and academic
- Sherwin Rosen (1938–2001), American labor economist
- Nathan Rosenberg 1927–2015), American economist and technology historian
- Eric S. Rosengren (born 1957), American economist
- Mark Rosenzweig, American economist and academic
- Stephen A. Ross (1944–2017), American financial economist and academic
- J. Barkley Rosser Jr. (1948–2023), American economist and academic
- Esteban Rossi-Hansberg (born 1973), Mexican-American economist
- Walt Whitman Rostow (1916–2003), American economist and political theorist
- Julio Rotemberg (1953–2017), Argentine/American economist
- Alvin E. Roth (born 1951), American economist and academic and Nobel Prize laureate
- Timothy P. Roth (born 1943), American economist and academic
- Murray Rothbard (1926–1995), American economist and political theorist
- Erwin Rothbarth (1913–1944), German economist
- Michael Rothschild (born 1942), American economist and academic
- Nouriel Roubini (born 1958), American economist
- Cecilia Rouse (born 1963), American economist and first African American chair of the Council of Economic Advisers
- Robert Rowthorn (born 1939), American economist and scholar
- Heather Royer (born 1974), American economist and academic
- Scott Rozelle (born 1955), American economist and academic
- Isaak Illich Rubin (1886–1937), Soviet economist and scholar
- Paul Rubin (born 1942), American economist and academic
- Daniel L. Rubinfeld, American economist and academic
- Ariel Rubinstein (born 1951), Israeli economist
- Richard Rumelt (born 1942), American economist and academic
- Isaak Russman (1938–2005), Soviet/Russian economist and mathematician
- John Rust (born 1955), American economist and econometrician
- Justinian Rweyemamu (1942–1982), Tanzanian economist and political strategist
- Tadeusz Rybczynski (1923–1998), Polish/English economist

== S ==
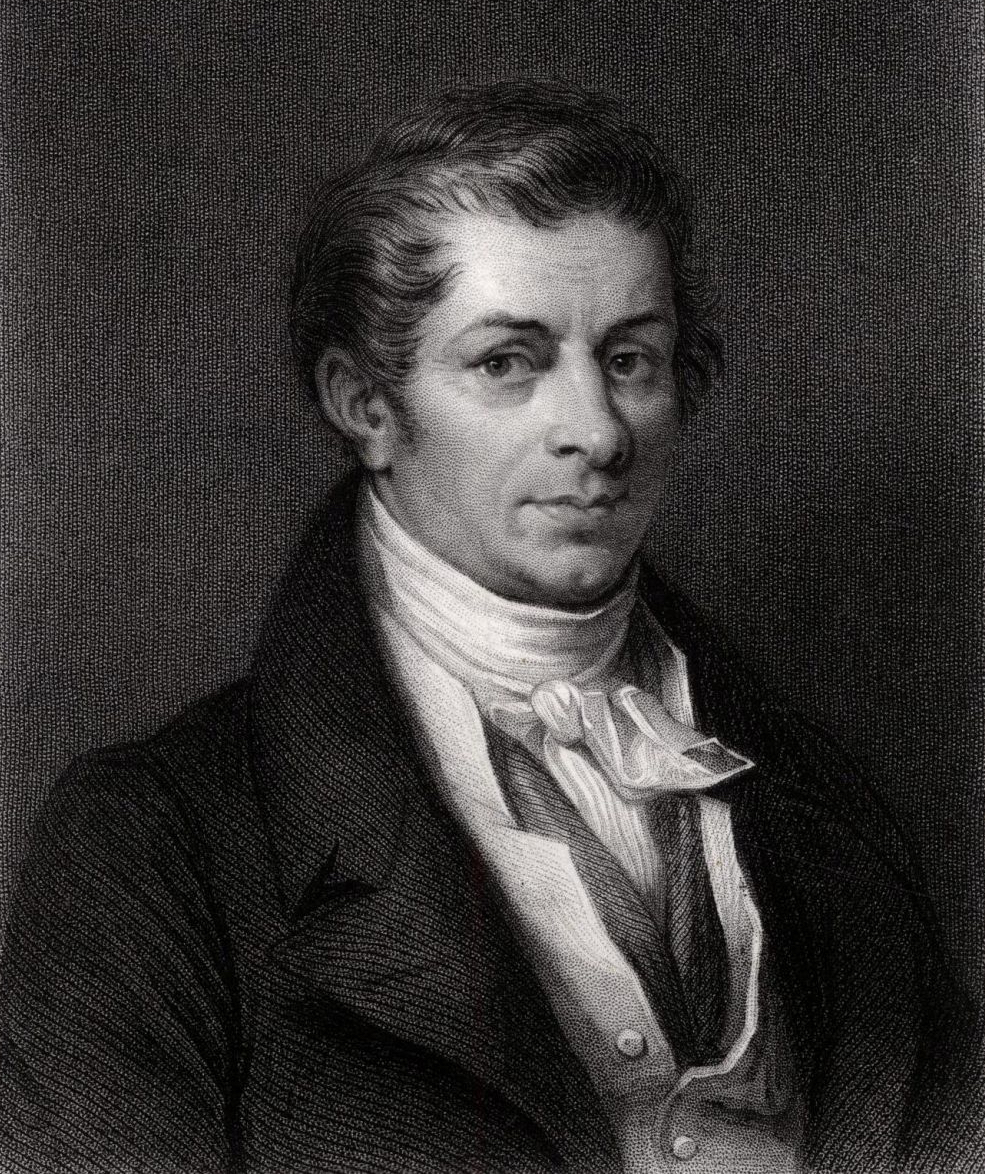
Jean-Baptiste Say

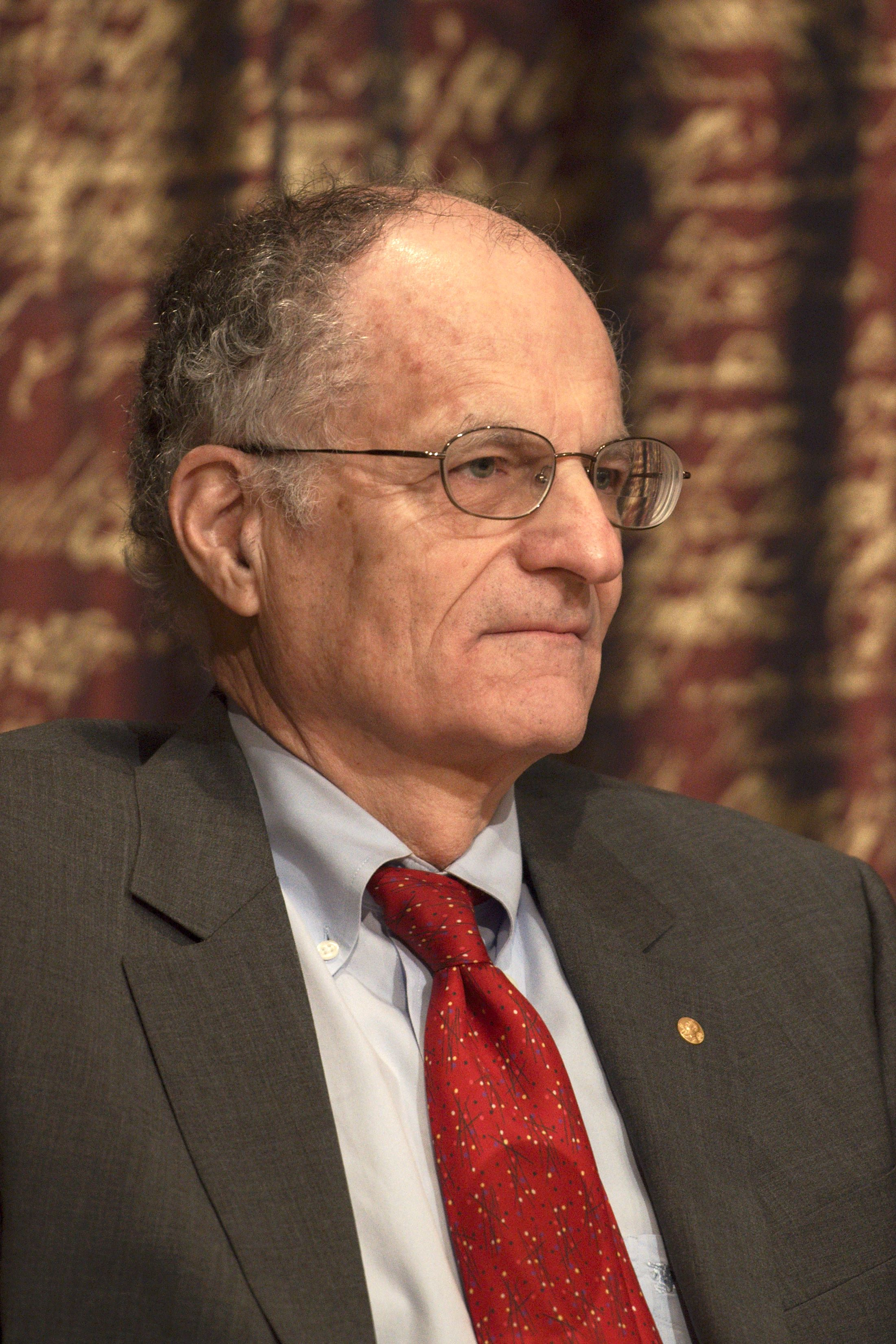
Thomas J. Sargent

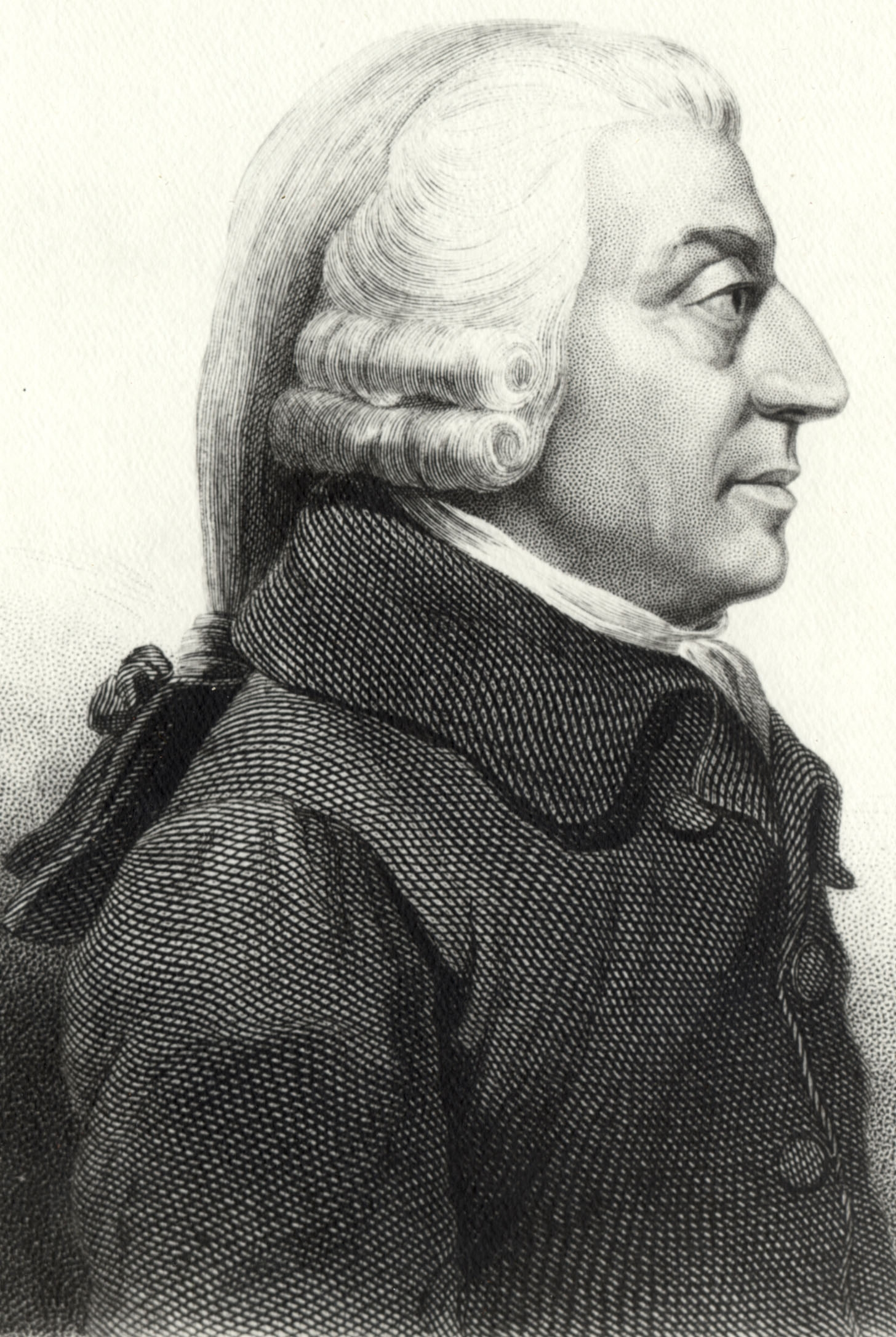
Adam Smith

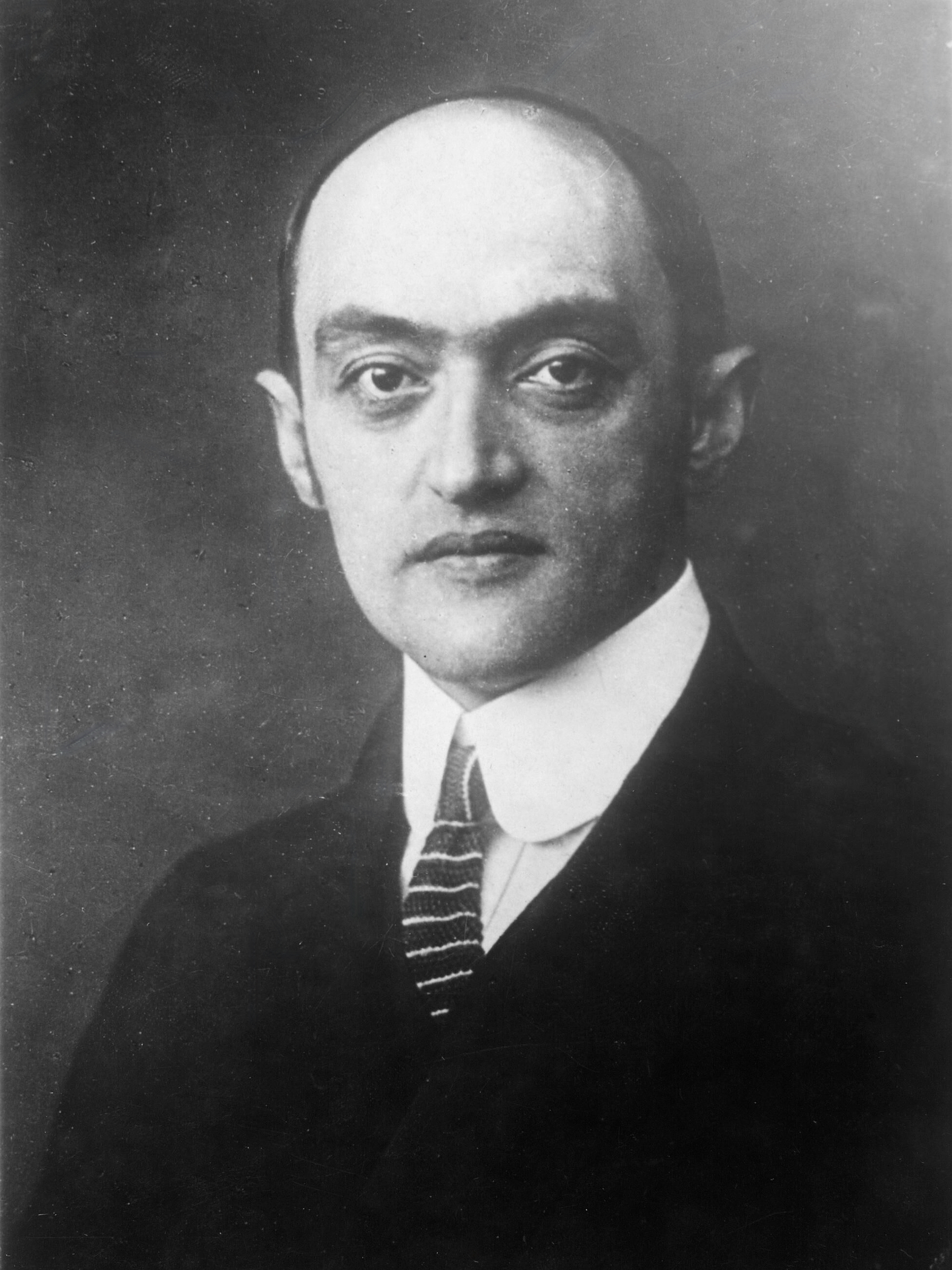
Joseph Schumpeter

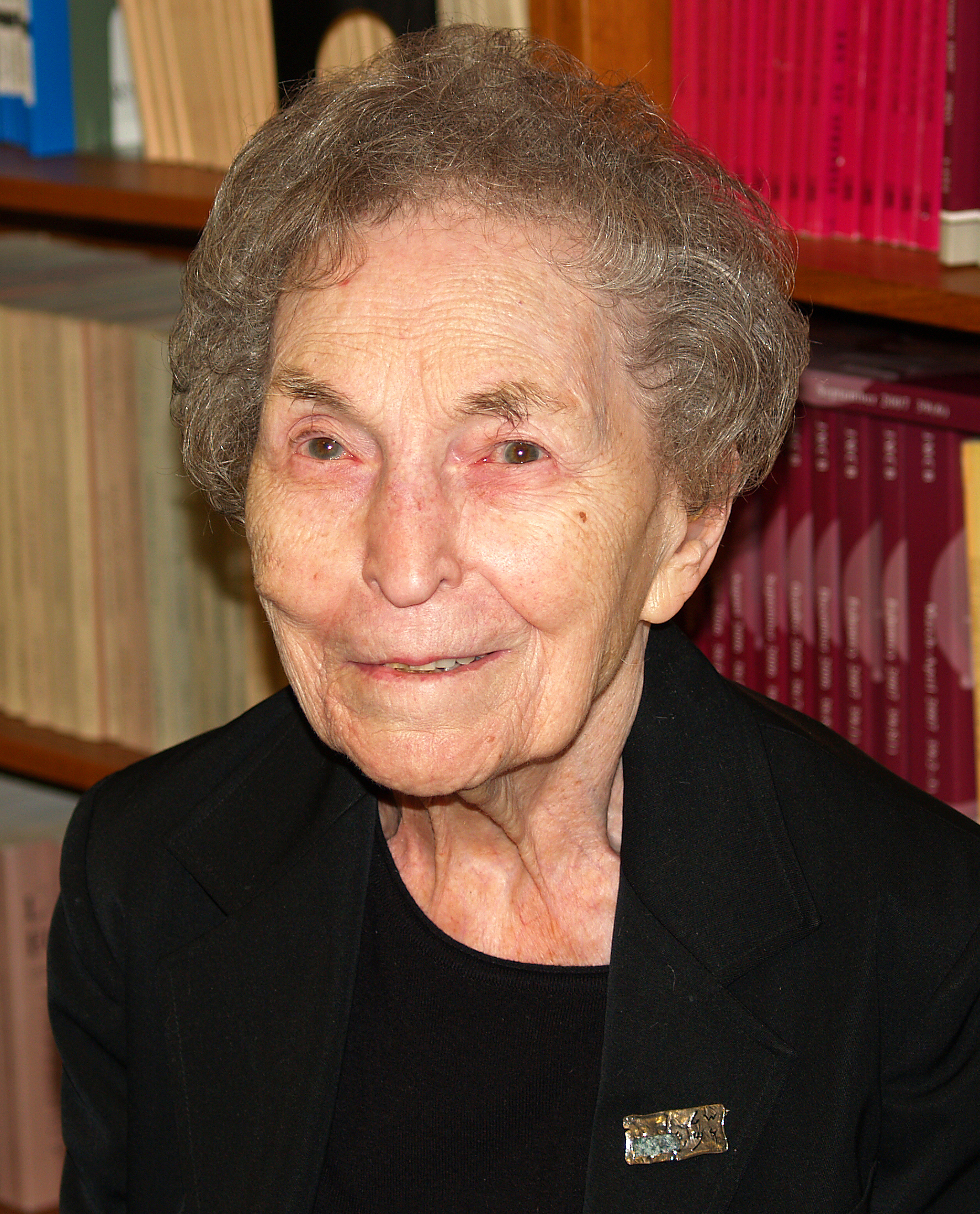
Anna Schwartz

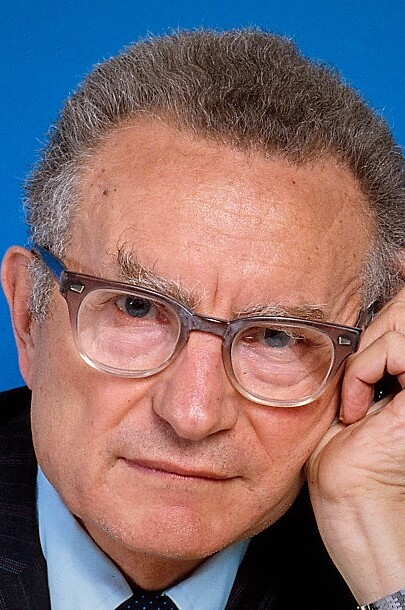
Paul Samuelson

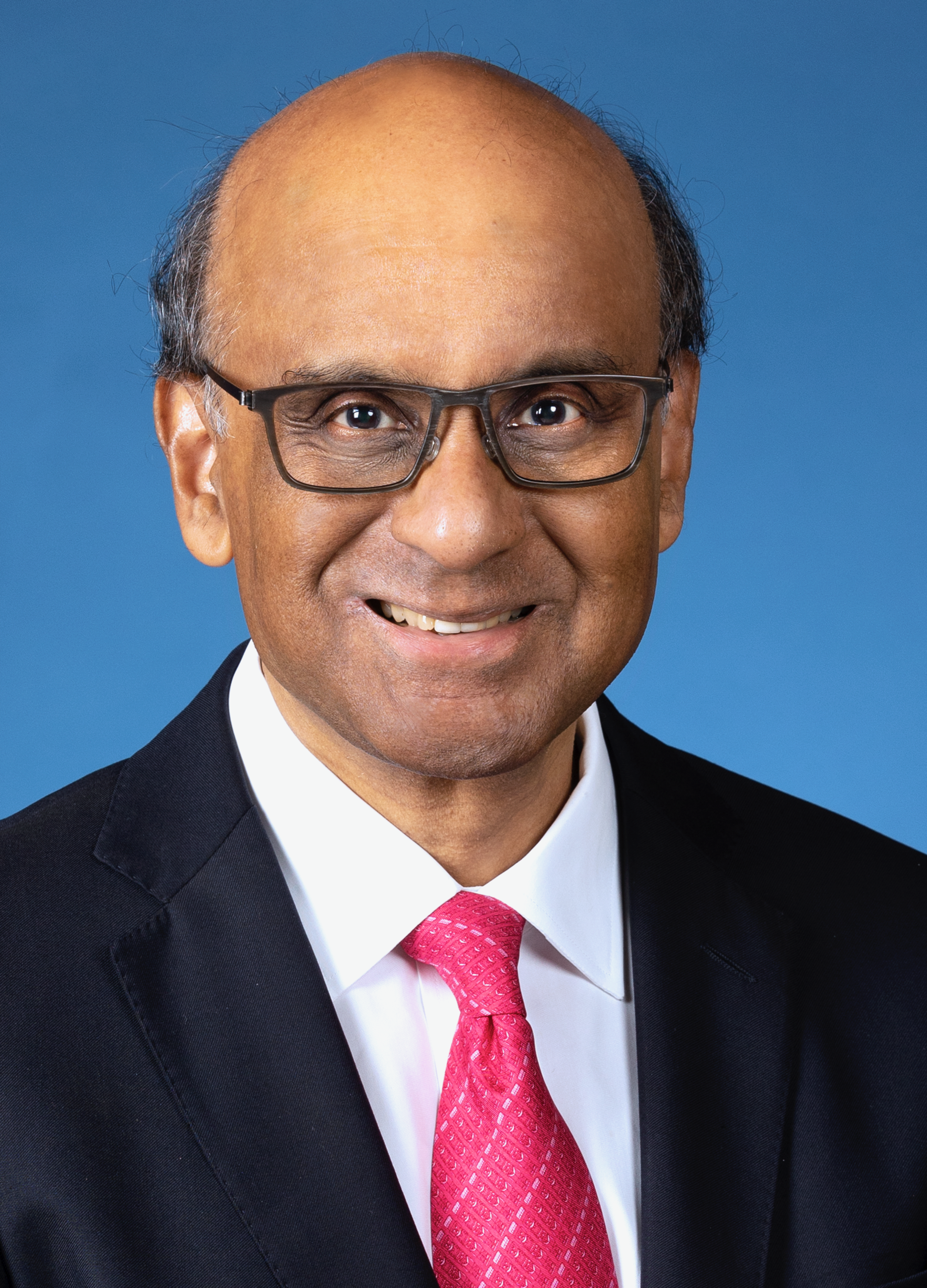
Tharman Shanmugaratnam

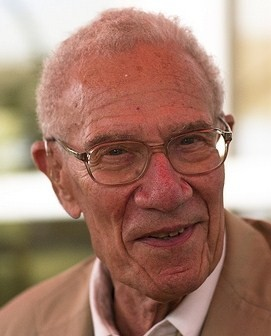
Robert Solow

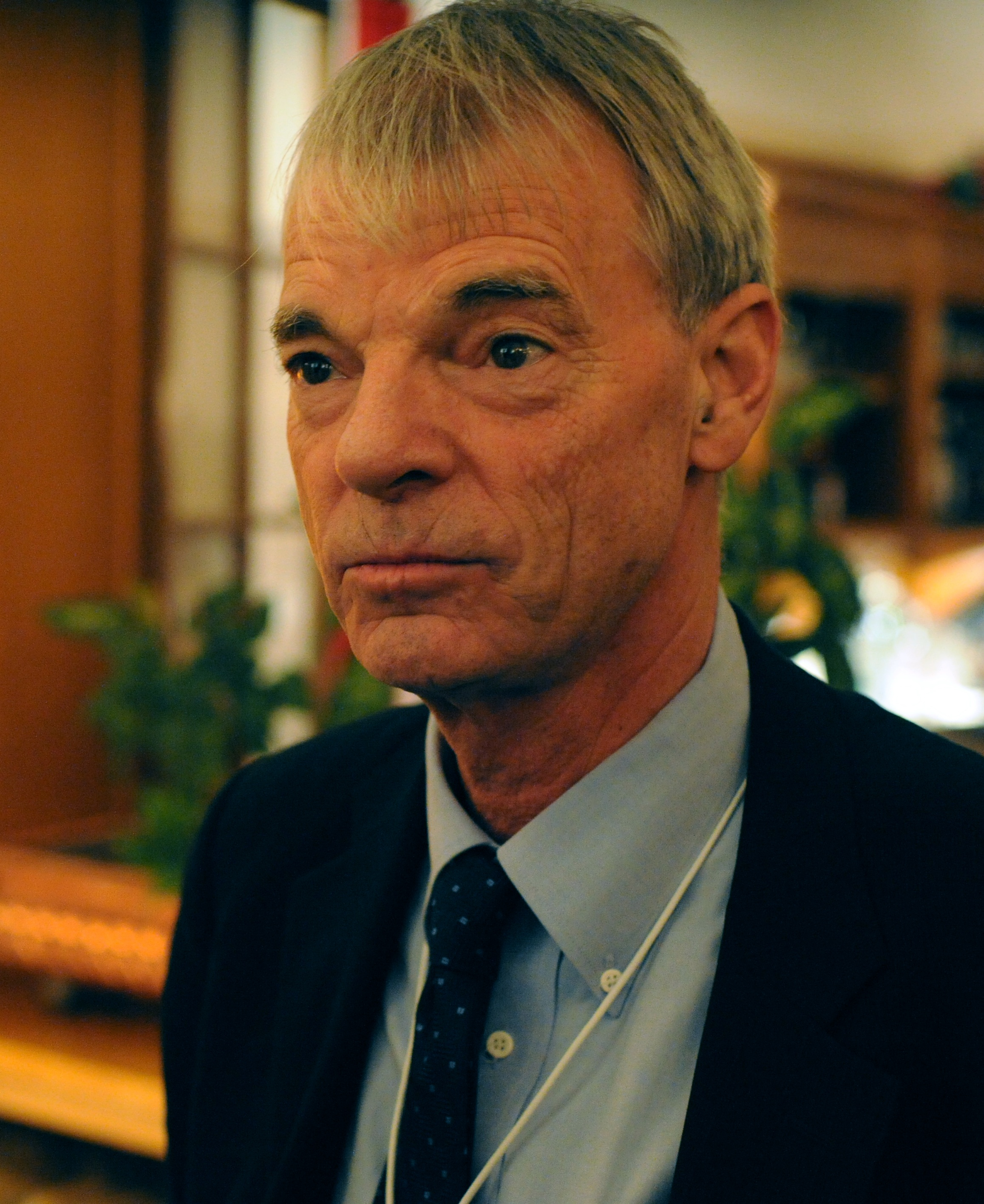
Michael Spence

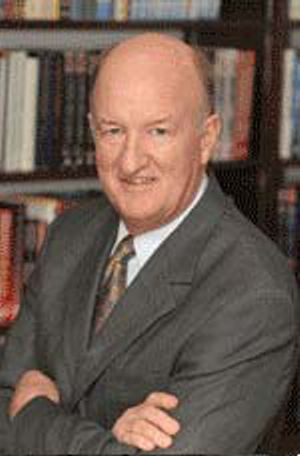
Mark Skousen

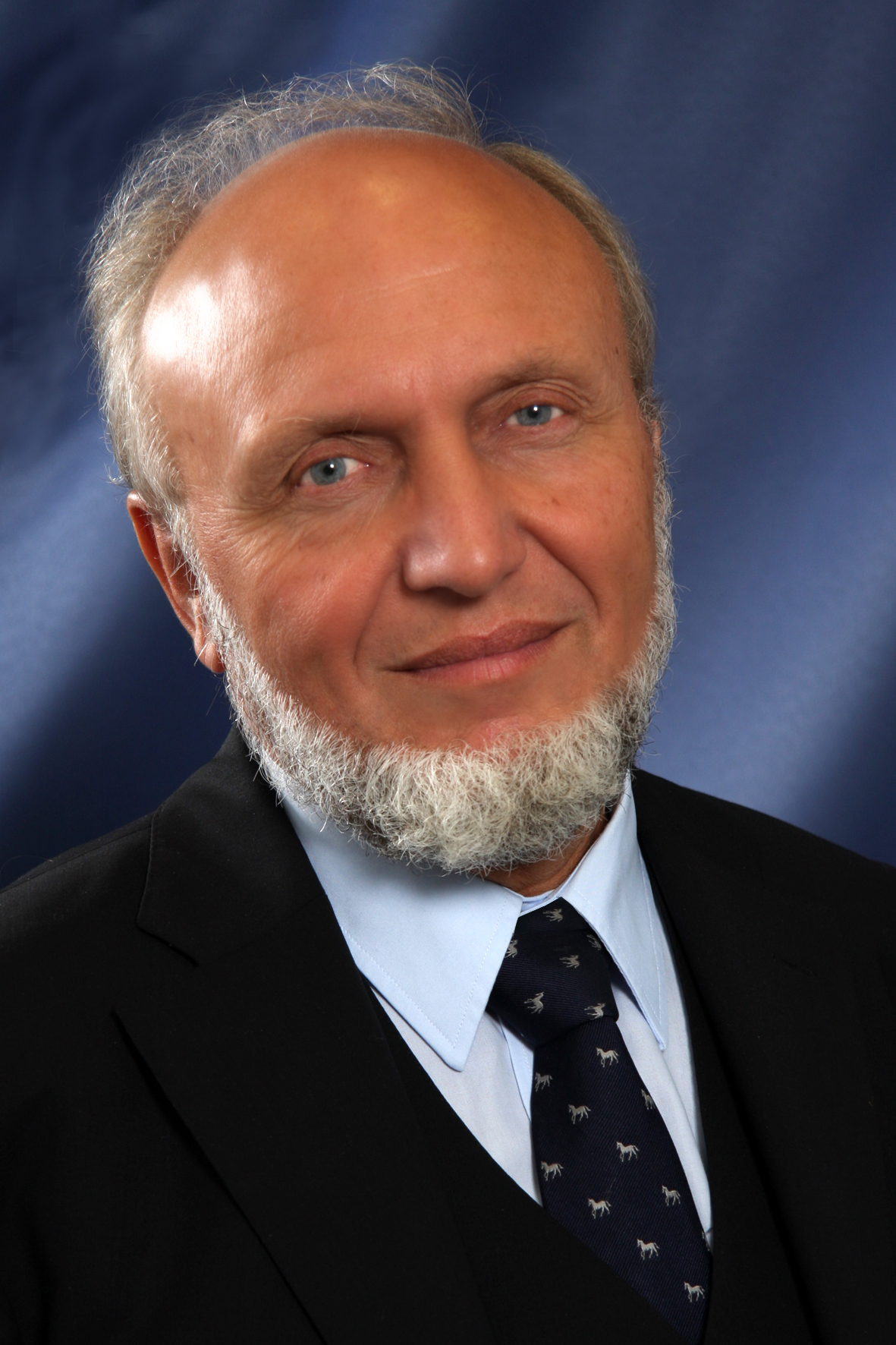
Hans-Werner Sinn

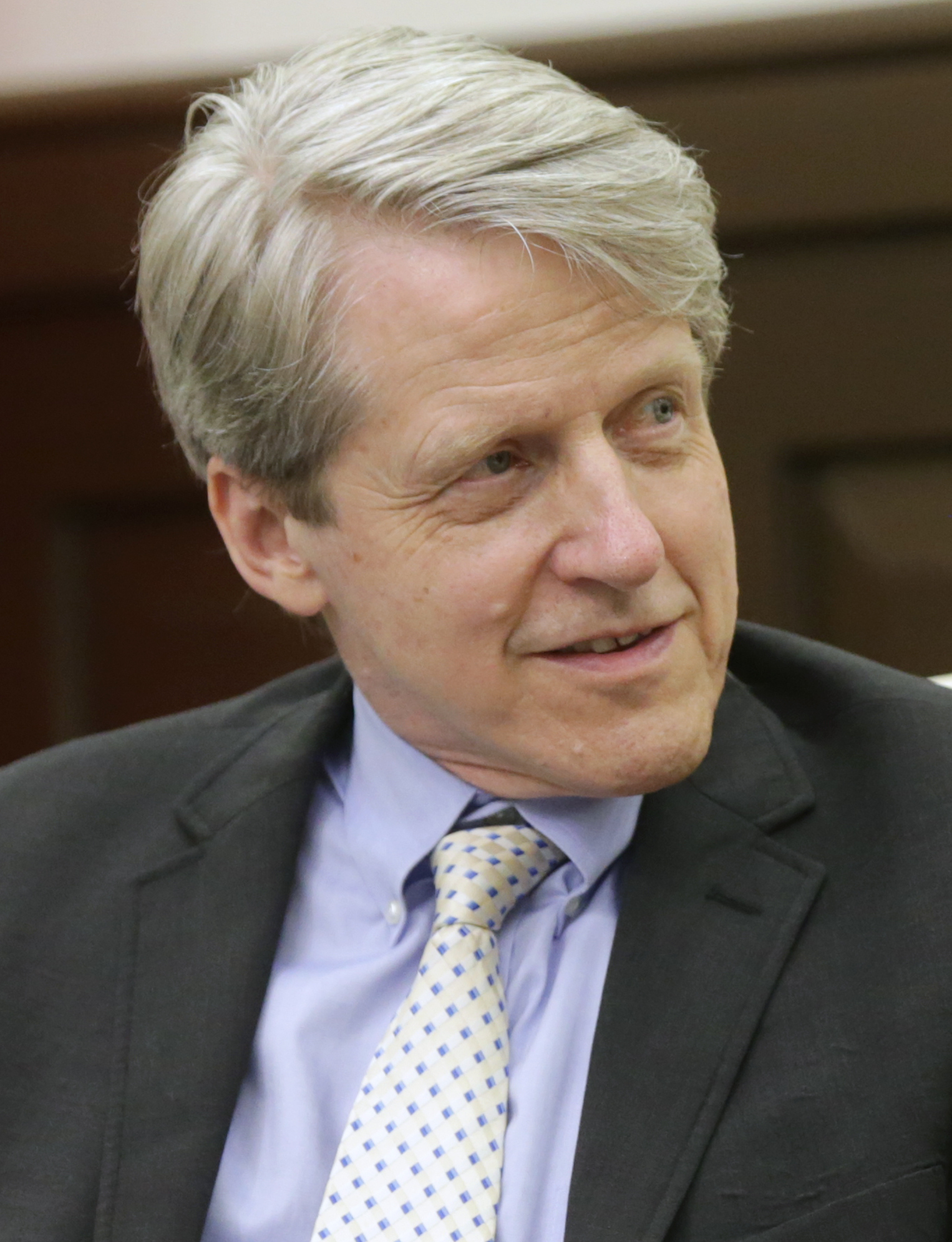
Robert Shiller

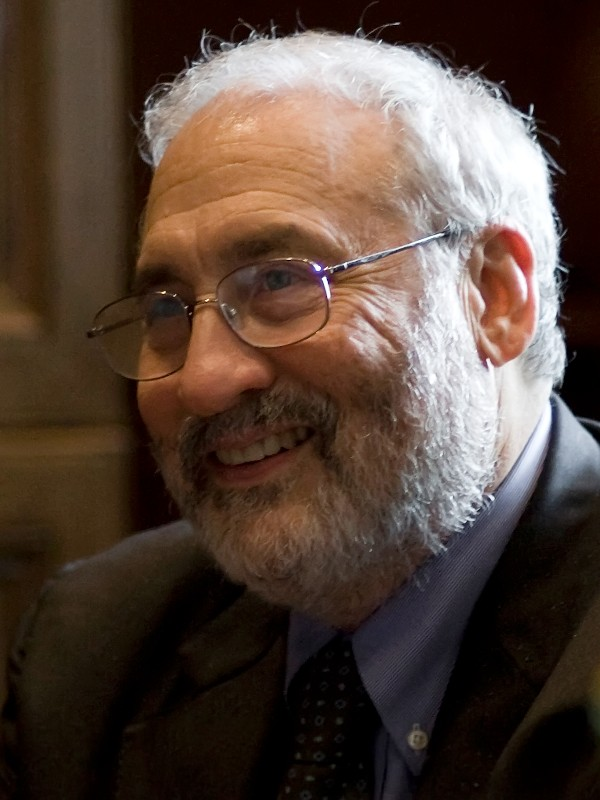
Joseph E. Stiglitz

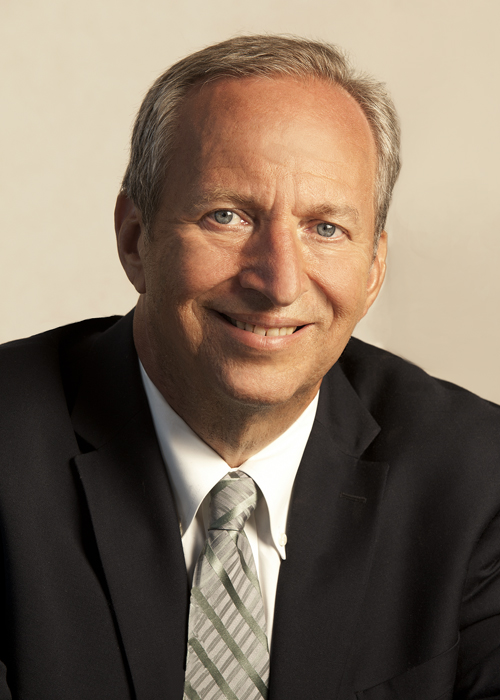
Lawrence Summers
- Alfredo Saad-Filho (born 19??), Brazilian economist
- Maksim Saburov (1900–1977), Soviet economist and engineer
- Fabrizio Saccomanni (1942–2019), Italian economist and central banker
- Alexander Sachs (1893–1973), American economist and financier
- Jeffrey Sachs (born 1954), American development economist
- Emmanuel Saez (born 1972), French/American economist, known for work on taxation and inequality
- Claudia Sahm (living), American macroeconomist
- Gilles Saint-Paul (born 1963), French economist
- Henri de Saint-Simon (1760–1825), French political and economic theorist
- Xavier Sala i Martin (born 1962), Spanish-American economist
- António de Oliveira Salazar (1889–1970), Portuguese dictator and economist, Prime Minister of Portugal 1932–1968
- Lise Salvas-Bronsard (1940–1995), Canadian economist and writer
- Arthur Salz (1881–1963), German economist and sociologist
- Paul Samuelson (1915–2009), American economist and Nobel laureate
- Chris William Sanchirico (living), American tax law expert
- José Santana (born 1962), Dominican economist
- Diego Abad de Santillán (1897–1983), Spanish/Argentinian economist, author and anarcho-syndicalist activist
- Juan Manuel Santos (born 1951), Colombian politician, economist and journalist, President of Colombia 2010–2018
- Theotônio dos Santos (1936–2018), Brazilian economist
- Gopal Krishna Sarangi (living), Indian economist specializing in energy economics and climate change
- Thomas J. Sargent, American macroeconomist, econometrician and Nobel laureate
- Mark Satterthwaite (living), American economist
- Anthony Saunders (living), American financial economist
- Jean-Baptiste Say (1767–1832), French businessman known for Say's law
- Louis Auguste Say (1774–1840), French businessman and economist
- Herbert Scarf (1930–2015), American mathematical economist
- Hjalmar Schacht (1877–1970), German economist and politician
- Morton O. Schapiro (born 1953), American economist and university president
- José Scheinkman (born 1948), Brazilian/American economist
- Thomas Schelling (1921–2016), American game theorist and Nobel laureate
- Peter Schiff (born 1963), American stockbroker and financial commentator
- Alexander Schlichter (1868–1940), Soviet economist
- Christoph M. Schmidt (born 1962), German economist
- Helmut Schmidt (1918–2015), German finance expert and politician
- John Schmitt (born 1962), American economist
- Gustav von Schmoller (1838–1917), German economist of the historical school
- Myron Scholes (born 1941), Canadian-American financial economist
- Stephan Schulmeister (born 1947), Austrian jurist and economist
- Theodore Schultz (1902–1998), American economist
- Ernst Schumacher (1911–1977), German/British statistician and economist
- Joseph Schumpeter (1883–1950), Austrian political economist
- Anna Schwartz (1915–2012), American monetarist economist
- Anne A. Scitovsky (1915–2012), German American health economist
- Tibor Scitovsky (1910–2002), Hungarian/American economist
- Molly Scott Cato (born 1963), English green economist and politician
- Ernesto Screpanti (born 1948), Italian economist and professor
- Jules Sedney (1922–2020), Surinam economist and prime minister
- L. William Seidman (1921–2009), American economist and commentator
- Thomas T. Sekine (1933–2022), Japanese economist
- Arthur Seldon (1916–2005), English economist
- Edwin R. A. Seligman (1861–1939), American economist
- Reinhard Selten (1930–2016), German economist and Nobel laureate
- Amartya Sen (born 1933), Indian economist, philosopher and Nobel laureate
- Hans Sennholz (1922–2007), German/American economist and author
- Nassau William Senior (1790–1864), English lawyer and economist
- Andrew Sentance (born 1958), English business economist
- Brad Setser (living), American economist and government official
- Ernest Seyd (1830–1881), German/British banker and economist
- G. L. S. Shackle (1903–1992), English economist
- Mehdi Shafaeddin (born 1945), Swiss Iranian development economist
- Anwar Shaikh (born 1945), Pakistani/American economist
- Tharman Shanmugaratnam (born 1957), Singapore economist/politician, President of Singapore since September 2023
- David Shapiro (born 1946), American economist
- Lloyd Shapley (1923–2016), American game theorist and Nobel laureate
- William F. Sharpe (born 1934), American economist and Nobel laureate
- Neil Shephard (born 1964), English econometrician
- Shouyong Shi (born 1965), Canadian macroeconomist
- Robert Shiller (born 1946), American economist and Nobel laureate
- Gary Shilling (living), American financial analyst and commentator
- Robert Shimer (born 1968), American macroeconomist and labor economist
- Hyun-Song Shin (신현송, living), S Korean economic theorist and financial economist
- Yongcheol Shin (born 1960), S Korea/British economist
- Masaaki Shirakawa (白川方明, born 1949), Japanese economist and central banker
- Andrei Shleifer (born 1961), Soviet/American economist and academic
- Artyom Shneyerov (living), Canadian microeconomist
- Martin Shubik (1926–2018), American economist
- Mohammad Najatuallah Siddiqui (born 1939), Indian/Jeddah economist and writer
- Henry Sidgwick (1838–1900), English utilitarian philosopher and economist
- Miguel Sidrauski (1939–1968), Argentine economist
- Ota Šik (1919–2004), Czechoslovak/Czech economist and politician
- Aníbal Cavaco Silva (born 1939), Portuguese economist and president
- Herbert A. Simon (1916–2001), American economist and political scientist
- Julian Lincoln Simon (1932–1998), American business administration academic
- Robert Simons, American economist and professor at Harvard Business School
- Christopher A. Sims (born 1942), American econometrician and macroeconomist
- Hans Singer (1910–2006), German/British development economist
- Kurt Singer (1886–1962), German economist and philosopher
- Paul Singer (1932-2018), Austrian-brazilian economist and scholar
- Manmohan Singh (1932–2024), Indian economist and politician
- Hans-Werner Sinn (born 1948), German economist and government adviser
- Mark Skousen (born 1947), American economist and writer
- Margaret Slade (living), Canadian industrial economist
- Andrzej Sławiński (born 1951), Polish economist and academic
- Joel Slemrod (born 1951), American economist and academic
- Eugen Slutsky (1880–1948), Russian/Soviet statistician and economist
- Adam Smith (1723–1790), Scottish economist, philosopher and moral philosopher
- Alasdair Smith (born 1949), Scottish/English economist and academic
- Thomas Smith (1631–1699), English banker
- Vernon L. Smith (born 1927), American economist and lawyer
- Dennis Snower (born 1950), Austrian/American macroeconomist
- Alfred Sohn-Rethel (1899–1990), German economist and philosopher
- Robert Solow (1924–2023), American economist and growth theorist
- Werner Sombart (1863–1941), German economist and sociologist
- Willem Somermeyer (1919–1982), Dutch economist and econometrician
- Hugo F. Sonnenschein (1940–2021), American economist and educationist
- Thomas Sowell (born 1930), American economist and social theorist
- Michael Spence (born 1943), Canadian/American economist and Nobel laureate
- Barbara J. Spencer (living), Australian/Canadian economist
- Gene Sperling (born 1958), American economist and presidential adviser
- Piero Sraffa (1898–1983), Italian/British economist and academic
- T. N. Srinivasan (1933–2018), Indian economist
- Peter St. Onge, American economist
- Guy Standing (born 1948), English labor economist
- Ross Starr (born 1945), American economist and academic
- Richard H. Steckel (born 1944), American heterodox economist
- Herbert Stein (1916–1999), American economist and presidential adviser
- Jeremy C. Stein (born 1960), American macroeconomist
- Nicholas Stern (born 1946), English economist and academic
- Beth Stetson, American economist
- George Stigler (1911–1991), American economist and Nobel laureate
- Joseph E. Stiglitz (born 1943), American economist and public policy analyst
- James H. Stock (born 1955), American economist and academic
- George W. Stocking, Sr. (1892–1975), American economist of industrial organization
- Nancy Stokey (born 1950), American economist, known for work on economic growth
- Richard Stone (1913–1991), English economist and Nobel laureate
- Benjamin Strong (1872–1928), American banker
- Steve Strongin (born 1958), American investment adviser
- Stanislav Strumilin (1877–1974), Russian/Soviet economist and statistician
- Federico Sturzenegger (born 1966), Argentinian economist and politician
- Robert Sugden (born 1949), English cognitive and behavioral economist
- Paul Sultan (1924–2019), Canadian labor economist
- Lawrence Summers (born 1954), American economist and World Bank vice-president
- Robert Summers (1922–2012), American economist and academic
- William Graham Sumner (1840–1910), American social scientist
- Sun Yefang (孙冶方, 1908–1983), Chinese economist
- Jomo Kwame Sundaram (born 1952), Malaysian economist and government adviser
- Arun Sundararajan (living), British/Indian/American economist and academic
- Eduardo Suplicy (living), Brazilian economist, politician and professor.
- Richard Sutch (1942–2019), American economist and academic
- Kotaro Suzumura (鈴村興太郎, 1944–2020), Japanese economist and academic
- Jan Švejnar (born 1952), Czechoslovak/American economist
- Lars E. O. Svensson (born 1947), Swedish economist and academic
- Subramanian Swamy (born 1939), Indian politician, economist and statistician
- Trevor Swan (1918–1989), Australian economist
- Paul Sweezy (1910–2004), American economist and political activist
- Syahrir (1945–2008), Indonesian political economist
- Richard Sylla (living), American economist and museum trustee
- Edward Szczepanik (1915–2005), Polish economist and politician
- Maria Szécsi (1914–1984), Austrian economist

== T ==
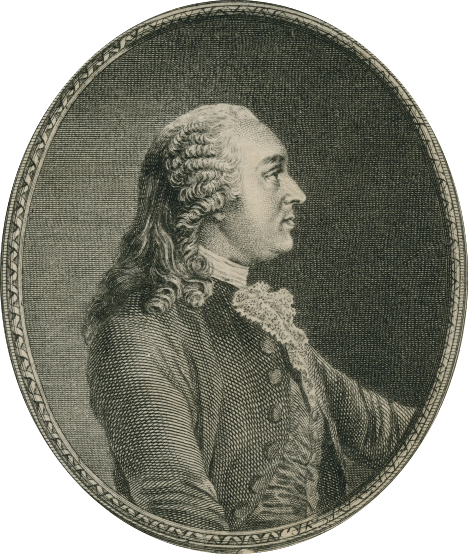
Anne Turgot

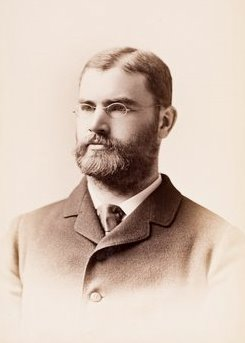
Frank William Taussig

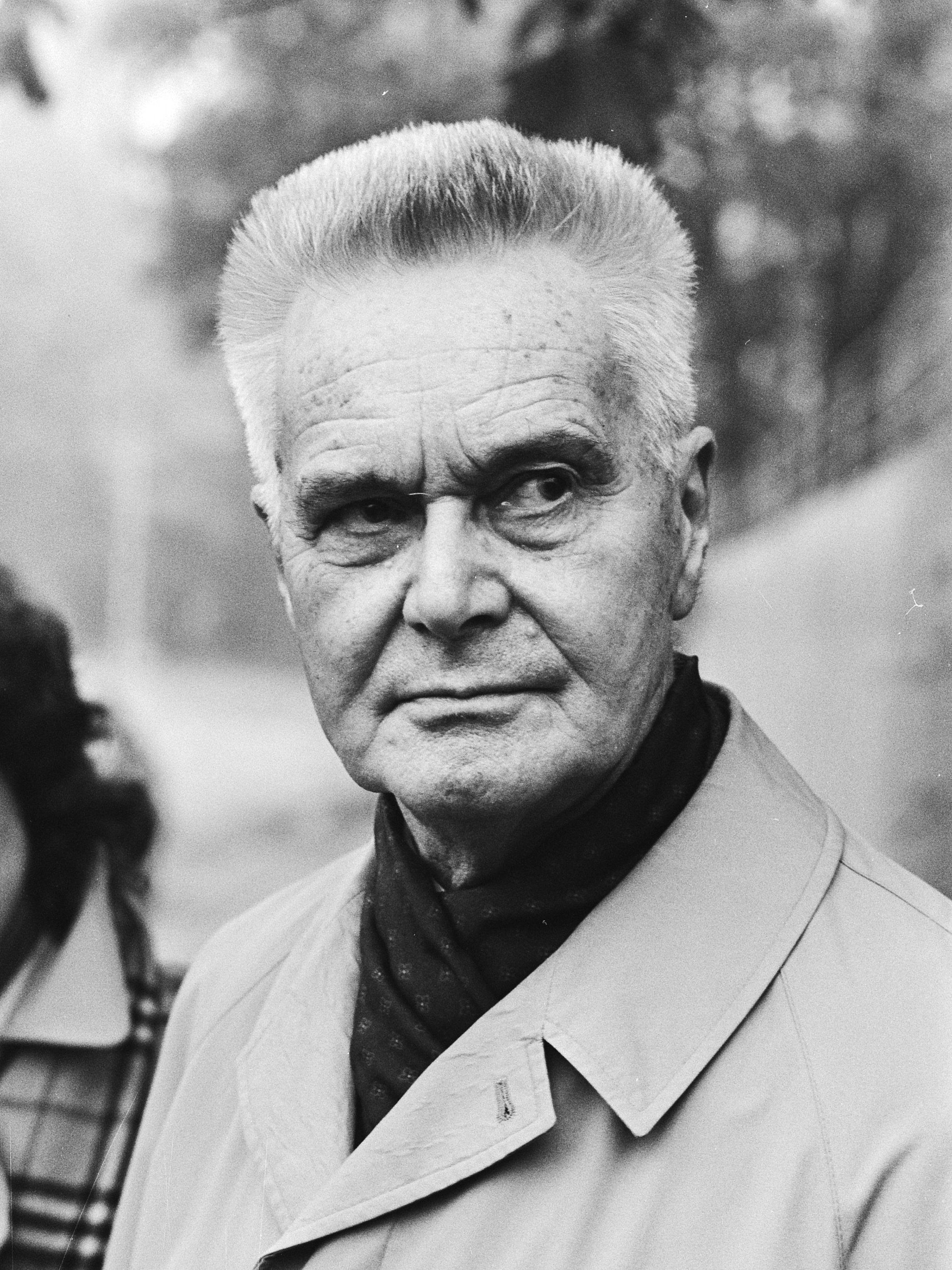
Jan Tinbergen

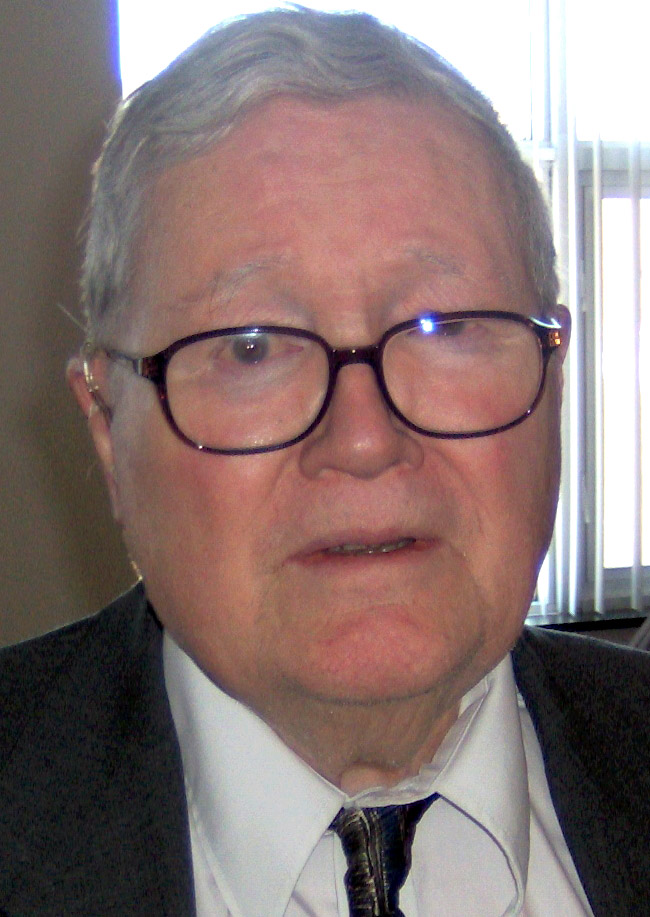
Gordon Tullock
- Alex Tabarrok (born 1966), Canadian/American economist
- Guido Tabellini (born 1956), Italian economist
- Hossein Abdoh Tabrizi (born 1951), Iranian professor and financial practitioner
- Naim Talu (1919–1998), Turkish economist and prime minister
- Yair Tauman (born 1948), Israeli/American economist and academic
- Frank William Taussig (1859–1940), American trade-theory economist
- Maria da Conceição Tavares (1930–2024), Portuguese-brazilian economist
- R. H. Tawney (1880–1962), English economic historian and socialist
- Fred M. Taylor (1855–1932), American economist and educator
- Henry Charles Taylor (1873–1969), American agricultural economist
- Alan M. Taylor (born 1964), American economist and academic
- John B. Taylor (born 1946), American economist and academic
- Mark P. Taylor (living), American business-school dean
- Paul Schuster Taylor (1895–1984), American agricultural economist and academic
- Lester G. Telser (born 1931), American economist and academic
- Richard Thaler (born 1945), American behavioral economist and academic
- Henri Theil (1924–2000), Dutch econometrician and academic
- Asher Tishler (born 1947), Israeli economist and college president
- William Thompson (1775–1833), Irish philosopher and social reformer
- Christopher Thornberg (born 1967), American economist
- Henry Thornton (1760–1815), English economist, banker and parliamentarian
- Johann Heinrich von Thünen (1783–1850), German economist and landowner
- Lester Thurow (1938–2016), American political economist and author
- Richard Timberlake (1922–2020), American economist and academic
- Jan Tinbergen (1903–1994), Dutch economist and Nobel laureate
- Jean Tirole (born 1953), French economist and academic
- Sheridan Titman (born 1954), American finance academic
- James Tobin (1918–2002), American economist and government adviser
- Michael Todaro (born 1942), American development economist
- Richard Tol (born 1969), Dutch/English economist and academic
- Alejandro Toledo (born 1946), Peruvian politician and writer on economics
- Robert Torrens (1780–1864), Irish/English political economist and writer
- Robert M. Townsend (born 1948), American economist and academic
- Kenneth E. Train (born 1951), American economist and academic
- Daniel Trefler (born 1959), Canadian economist and academic
- Rodrigue Tremblay (born 1939), Canadian economist and politician
- Giulio Tremonti (born 1947), Italian economic politician
- Jean-Claude Trichet (born 1942), French economist and European Central Bank president
- Robert Triffin (1911–1993), Belgian/American economist
- Sho-Chieh Tsiang (蔣碩傑, 1918–1993), Chinese/American economist
- Shigeto Tsuru (1912–2006), Japanese economist
- Catherine Tucker (born 1977), management academic
- Mikhail Tugan-Baranovsky (1865–1919), Russian economist and politician
- Gordon Tullock (1922–2014), American economist and professor of law
- Anne Robert Jacques Turgot (1727–1781), French economist and politician
- Adair Turner, Baron Turner of Ecchinswell (born 1955), English economist and business executive
- Amos Tversky (1937–1996), Israeli cognitive and mathematical psychologist
- Laura D'Andrea Tyson (born 1947), American economist and presidential adviser

== U ==
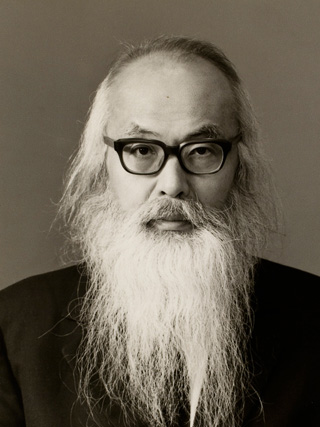
Hirofumi Uzawa
- Kazuhide Uekusa (植草一秀, born 1960), Japanese economist
- Kuzo Uno (宇野 弘蔵, 1897–1977), Japanese economist
- Hirofumi Uzawa (宇沢弘文, 1928–2014), Japanese economist

== V ==
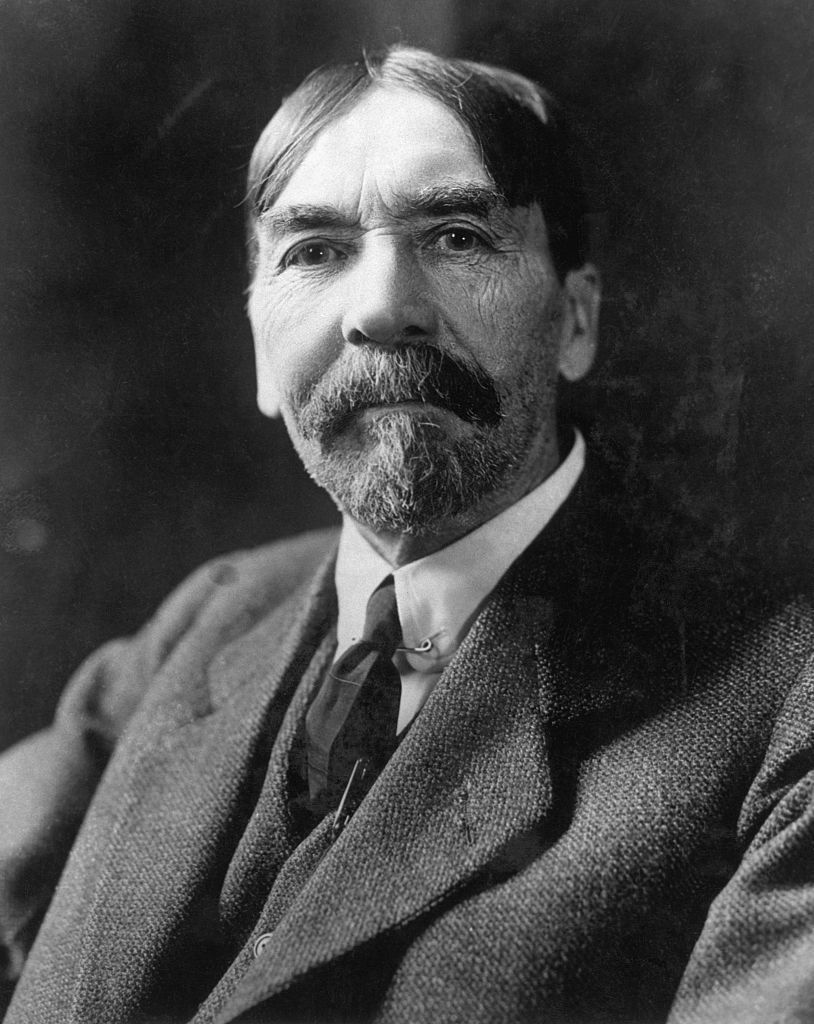
Thorstein Veblen

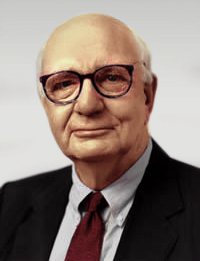
Paul Volcker
- Natacha Valla (born 1976), French economist and management expert
- Alexander Van der Bellen (born 1944), Austrian economist and president
- Philippe Van Parijs (born 1951), Belgian professor and political economist
- John Van Reenen (born 1965), English economist and academic
- Eugen Varga (1879–1964), Austro-Hungarian/Soviet Marxian economist
- Hal Varian (born 1947), American microeconomist and Google executive
- Yanis Varoufakis (born 1961), Greek/Australian economist and politician
- Antoaneta Vassileva (born 1960), Bulgarian economist and academic
- Kerrin Vautier, New Zealand economist
- Thorstein Veblen (1857–1929), American economist and sociologist
- Richard Vedder (born 1940), American economist and historian
- Carlos A. Vegh (born 1951), Uruguayan academic economist
- Anthony Venables (born 1953), English economist and academic
- Fernando Vianello (1939–2009), Italian economist and academic
- William Vickrey (1914–1996), Canadian/American economist and Nobel laureate
- Thomas Vietorisz (1926–2019), Hungarian-born American economist and urban planner
- Jacob Viner (1892–1970), American economist
- Ignazio Visco (born 1949), Italian economist and central-bank governor
- Robert W. Vishny (b. c. 1959), American economist and finance academic
- Eva Vivalt (living), Canadian economist
- Xavier Vives (born 1955), Spanish microeconomist
- Paul Volcker (1927–2019), American economist and presidential adviser

== W ==
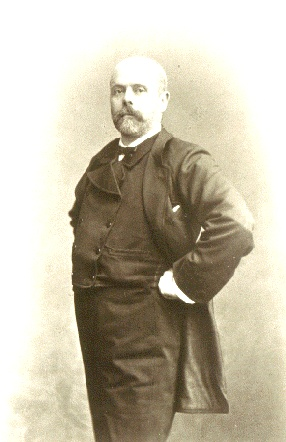
Léon Walras

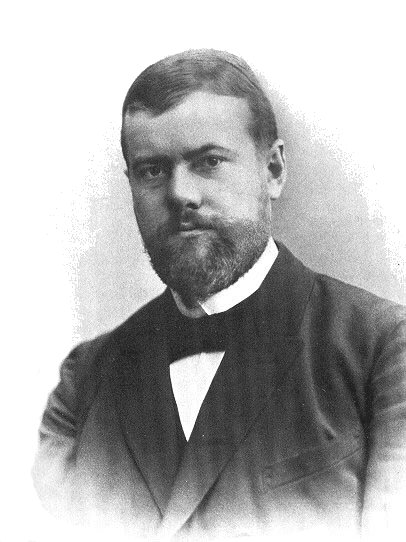
Max Weber

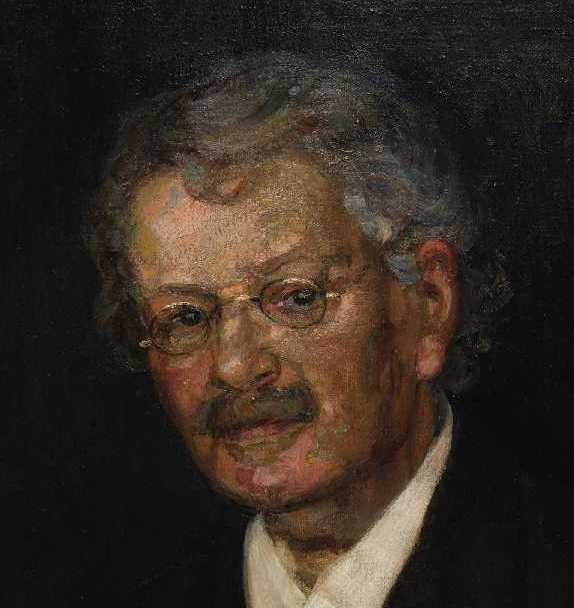
Knut Wicksell

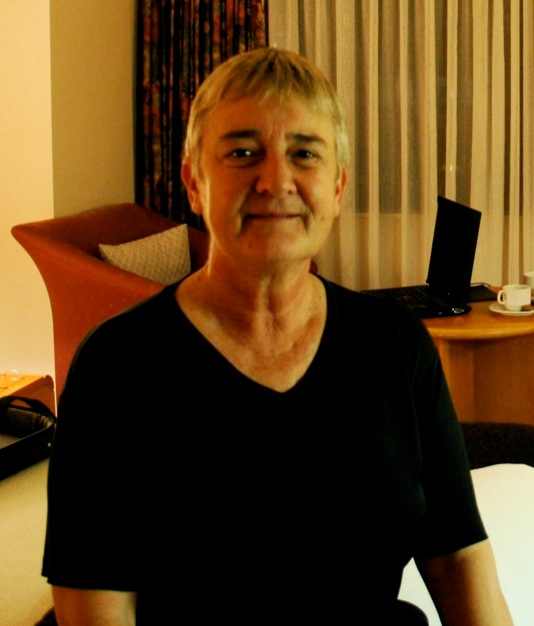
Marilyn Waring

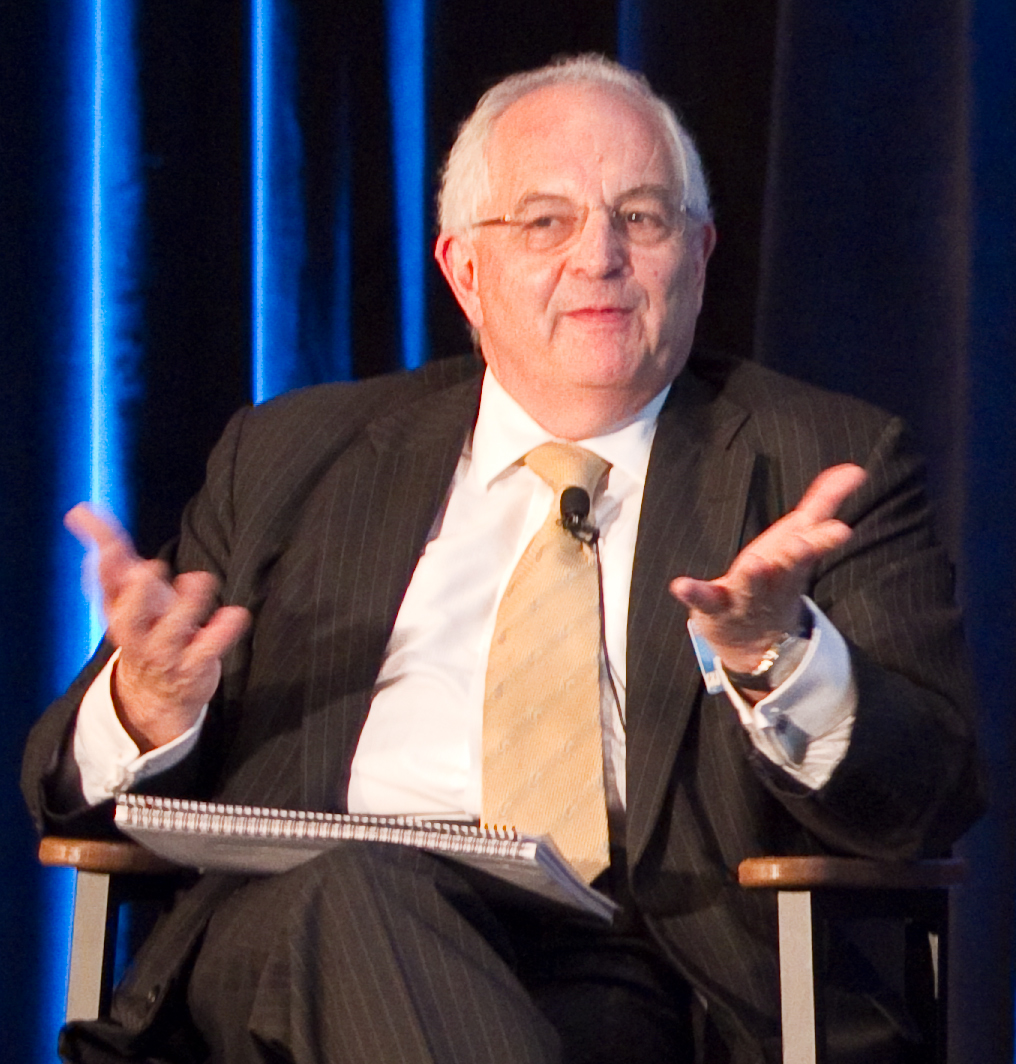
Martin Wolf

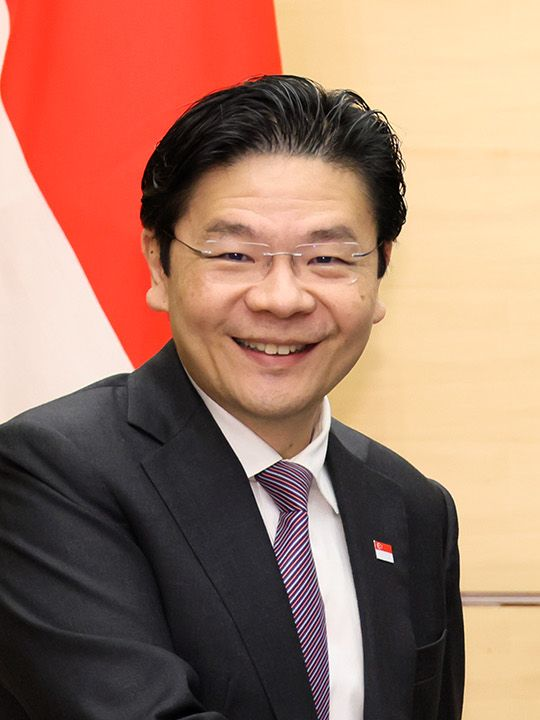
Lawrence Wong
- Romain Wacziarg (born 1970), American economist and academic
- Sushil Wadhwani (born 1959), Indian/British economist and monetary policy expert
- Adolph Wagner (1835–1917), German economist and politician
- Jim Walker (living), American economist and fund manager
- Neil Wallace (born 1939), American economist and academic
- Phyllis Ann Wallace (1921–1993), American economist and political activist
- Henry Wallich (1914–1988), German/American economist and central banker
- W. Allen Wallis (1912–1998), American economist and statistician
- Léon Walras (1834–1910), French mathematical economist
- Carl Walsh (born 1949), American economist and academic
- Alan Walters (1926–2009), English economist and government adviser
- Wang Luolin (born 1938), Chinese economist, educator and politician
- John Glen Wardrop (1922–1989), English mathematician and transport analyst
- Marilyn Waring (born 1952), New Zealand international development consultant
- Mark Watson (born 1952), American econometrician and macroeconomist
- Beatrice Webb (1858–1943), English sociologist and economist
- Sidney Webb (1859–1947), English socialist, economist and academic
- Alfred Weber (1868–1958), German economist and geographer
- Isabella Weber (born 1987), German economist active in the United States
- Max Weber (1864–1920), German sociologist and political economist
- Dorothy Wedderburn (1925–2012), English academic
- Beatrice Weder di Mauro (born 1965), Swiss economist and policy adviser
- Jens Weidmann (born 1968), German economist and central banker
- Burton Weisbrod (born 1931), American economist and academic
- Mark Weisbrot (living), American economist and writer
- Thomas J. Weiss (born 1942), American economist and academic
- Martin Weitzman (1942–2019), American economist and academic
- Richard Werner (born 1967), German/English banker and economist
- Brian Wesbury (born 1958), American macroeconomist and forecaster
- Richard Whately (1787–1863), English archbishop, philosopher and economist
- Edward Lawrence Wheelwright (1921–2007), Australian economist and radio host
- Halbert White (1950–2012), American economist and academic
- Knut Wicksell (1851–1926), Swedish economist
- Philip H Wicksteed (1844–1927), English economist and theologian
- Friedrich von Wieser (1851–1926), Austrian economist
- Clair Wilcox (1898–1970), American economist
- E.L.R. Williamson (1911-2000), Canadian economist and environmentalist
- John Williamson (1937–2021), English/American economist
- Oliver E. Williamson (1932–2020), American economist and academic
- Walter E. Williams (1936–2020), American economist and academic
- Ulrich Witt (born 1946), German economist and academic
- Tadeusz Wojciechowski (1925–2026), Polish economist, professor, and Warsaw Uprising participant
- Charles Wolf, Jr (1924–2016), American economic adviser and researcher
- Martin Wolf (born 1946), English writer on economics
- Arnold Wolfers (1892–1968), Swiss/American economist and lawyer
- Justin Wolfers (born 1972), Australian economist and public policy expert
- Edward Wolff (born 1946), American economist and academic
- Richard D. Wolff (born 1942), American Marxian economist
- Myrna Wooders (born 1950), Canadian economist and game theorist
- Michael Dean Woodford (born 1955), American macroeconomist and monetary theorist
- Jeffrey Wooldridge (born 1960), American econometrician
- Lawrence Wong Shyun Tsai (黄循财, born 1972), Singaporean economist and politician, Prime Minister of Singapore since May 2024.
- Holbrook Working (1895–1985), American economist and statistician
- Stephen T. Worland (1923–2017, American economist and economic historian
- L. Randall Wray (born 1953), American economist and academic
- Simon Wren-Lewis (living), English economist and economic policy expert
- Gavin Wright (born 1943), American economic historian
- Philip Green Wright (1861–1934), American economist and econometrician
- Randall Wright (born 1956), Canadian macroeconomist
- Wu Jinglian (吴敬琏, born 1940), Chinese economist

== X ==
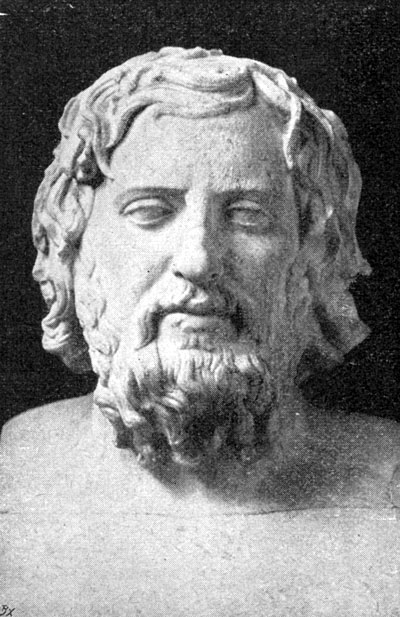
Xenophon of Athens
- Xenophon (c. 430–354 BC), Ancient Greek, author of Oeconomicus
- Xue Muqiao (1904–2005), Chinese economist

== Y ==
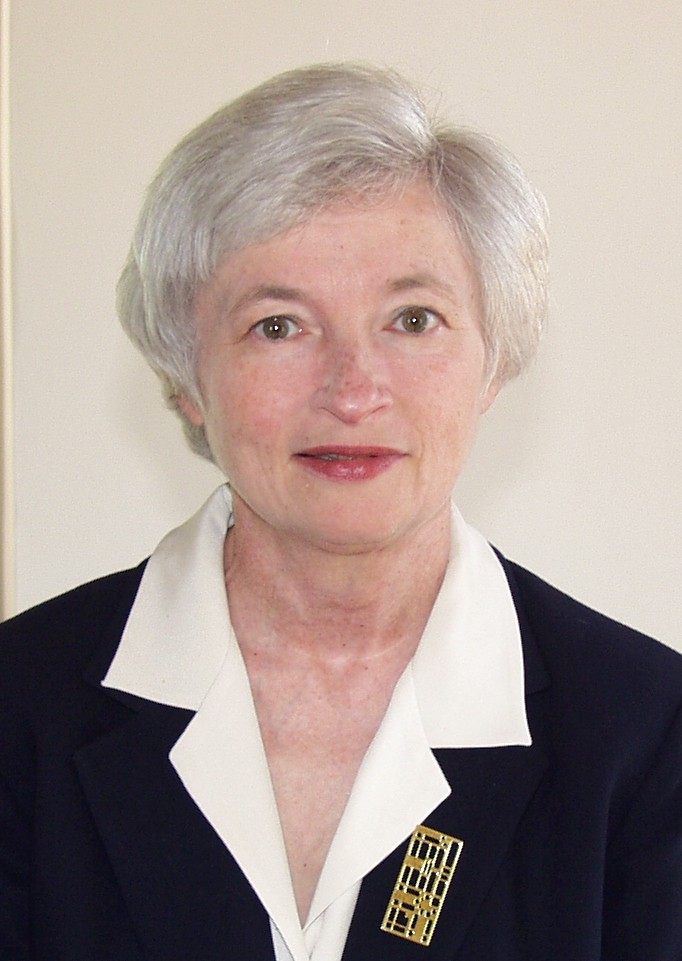
Janet Yellen

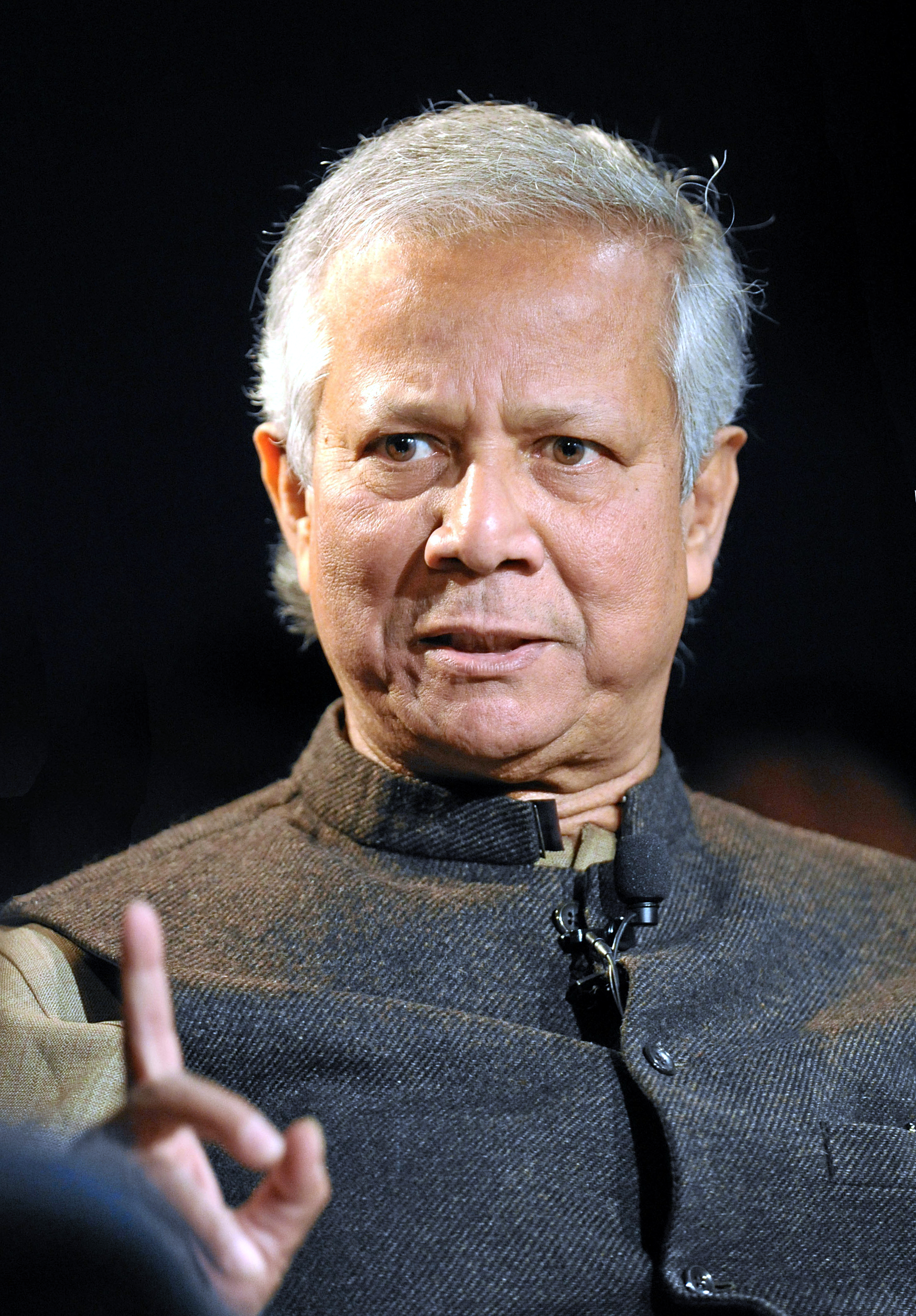
Muhammad Yunus
- Menahem Yaari (born 1935), Israeli economist
- Basil Yamey (1919–2020), S African economist
- Xiaokai Yang (杨小凯, 1948–2004), Chinese/Australian economist and analyst
- Janet Yellen (born 1946), American economist and policy-maker
- Allyn Abbott Young (1876–1929), American/British economist and statistician
- Alwyn Young (living), English economist and academic
- Arthur Young (1741–1820), English agriculturalist
- Peyton Young (born 1945), American game theorist and economist
- Y. V. Reddy (born 1941), Indian economist
- Yu Guangyuan (于光遠, 1915–2013), Chinese economist and philosopher
- Linda Yueh (born 1977), Taiwanese/American economist and broadcaster
- Muhammad Yunus (born 1940), Bangladeshi entrepreneur and economist

== Z ==
- Richard Zeckhauser (born 1940), American economist and academic
- Zeine Ould Zeidane (born 1966), Mauritanian economist and politician
- Milan Zeleny (born 1942), Czechoslovak/American politician
- Arnold Zellner (1927–2010), American economist and statistician
- Yves Zenou (living), French/Swedish economist and academic
- Zhang Weiying (张维迎, born 1959), Chinese economist and academic
- Zhou Xiaochuan (周小川, born 1948), Chinese economist and banking official
- Nikolai Ziber (1844–1888), Ukrainian academic economist and professor
- Jeffrey Zients (born 1966), American business executive and government official
- Fabrizio Zilibotti (born 1964), Italian/American economist and academic
- Luigi Zingales (born 1963), Italian economist and finance professor
- Xenophon Zolotas (1904–2004), Greek economist and prime minister

== See also ==
- History of economic thought
- Schools of economic thought
- List of Austrian-school economists
- List of business theorists
- List of feminist economists
- List of game theorists
- List of Jewish economists
- List of Marxian economists
- List of Nobel laureates in Economics
- List of socialist economists
- List of think tanks
- List of Uruguayan economists
