= Vancouver School of Economics =

School of the University of British Columbia, Canada

UBC Vancouver School of Economics
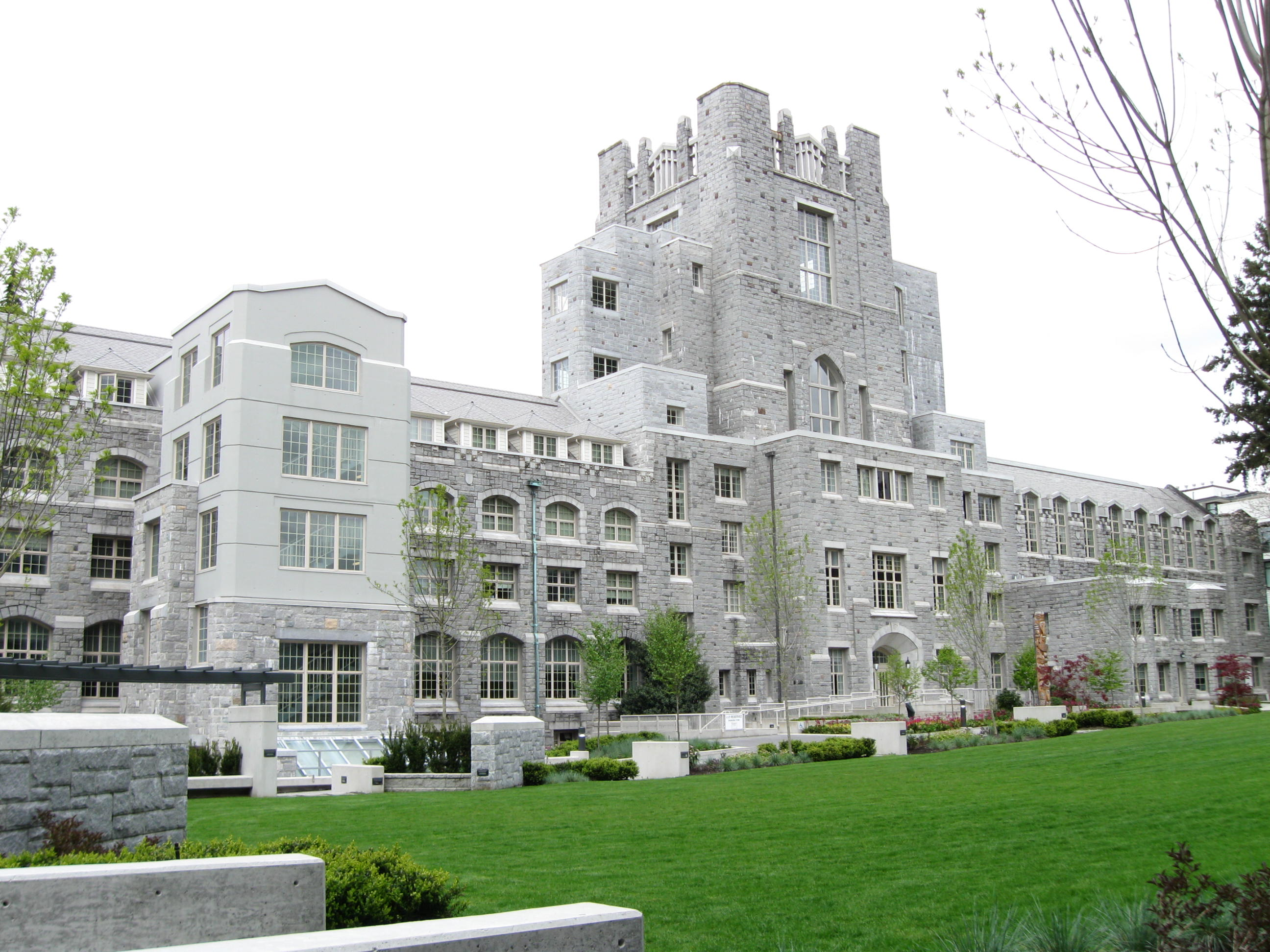
- The Vancouver School of Economics is located in the Iona Building at UBC Vancouver
- Former name: Department of Economics
- Established: 1915; 111 years ago
- Parent institution: University of British Columbia Faculty of Arts
- Director: Kevin Milligan
- Faculty: 50
- Undergraduates: 856
- Postgraduates: 42
- Doctoral students: 83
- Location: Vancouver, British Columbia, Canada; 49°16′0.92″N 123°14′50.88″W
- Website: economics.ubc.ca

The Vancouver School of Economics (also known as VSE) is a school of the University of British Columbia located in Vancouver, BC, Canada. The school ranks as one of the top 25 in the world and top in Canada. The school exhibits research activity and offers undergraduate and graduate degrees.

== International rankings and recognitions ==
The Vancouver School of Economics is ranked:

- First in Canada, according to a September 2026 ranking compiled on IDEAS
- 25th in the world (1st in Canada) as of November 2026 by the Research Papers in Economics.
- 16th in the world (1st in Canada) by the Times Higher Education ranking for the social sciences category, which includes economics.
- 23rd in the world (2nd in Canada) by Tilburg University based on research contribution from 2007 to 2011.
- 24th in the world (1st in Canada) by the Academy Ranking of World Universities (ARWU) for the economics/business category in 2010.
- 24th in the world (1st in Canada) from 1990 to 2000 period by Dr. Tom Coupe, director of the Kyiv School of Economics in an independent study that included the use of 11 methodologies.
- 25th in the world (2nd in Canada) by the Tilburg University Top 100 Worldwide Economics Schools Research Ranking based on research contribution 2007–2011.

The school's faculty frequently receive the John Rae Prize, given by the Canadian Economics Association. This prize is awarded to the Canadian economist with the best recent research. In 2018, Siwan Anderson, a development economist at the VSE, received the Rae prize, becoming its first woman recipient.

== Research ==
In 2024 The School established the Stone Centre on Wealth and Income Inequality, the first of its kind in Canada. The Centre focuses on research, teaching, and knowledge mobilization efforts relating to wealth and income inequality, both within Canada and around the world.

The School manages the British Columbia Inter-University Research Data Centre. The RDC provides access, for approved projects, to selected confidential Statistics Canada micro-level data.

Additionally, the School operates the Experimental Lab, a centre for research in experimental economics; and the Institute for Advanced Studies in Economics, a teaching and research initiative by the Vancouver School of Economics and the Strategy and Business Economics Division, Sauder School of Business.

== Admissions ==
In 2002, UBC's Faculty of Arts expanded the number of full-time equivalent undergraduate student spaces in economics by 50%. Academic programs in economics in UBC's Faculty of Arts are all administrated by the Vancouver School of Economics (formerly the Department of Economics). For instance, for the September 2013 intake for the 85 spaces in the BIE program over 2,100 applications were received, and over 480 applications were submitted for the 284 third-year spaces available in the Majors program.

== Faculty and alumni ==
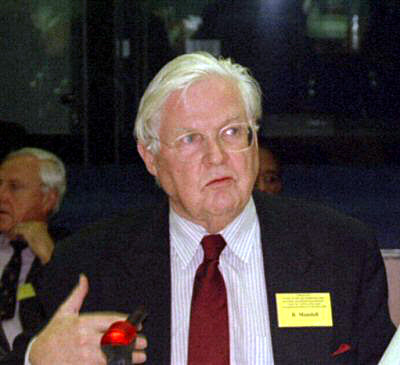
Robert Mundell, Nobel Laureate in Economics

The VSE (and its predecessor, the Department of Economics) has many reputable faculty and alumni, including:

- Nobel Prize-winning economist, Robert Mundell, who studied economics as an undergraduate at UBC. Mundell received the Nobel Memorial Prize in Economic Sciences in 1999 for his work in monetary dynamics and optimum currency areas. Mundell laid the groundwork for the introduction of the euro through this work and helped to start the movement known as supply-side economics. Mundell is also known for the Mundell–Fleming model and Mundell–Tobin effect.
- Dominic Barton was the worldwide managing director and head of McKinsey & Company. He was McKinsey’s chairman in Asia from 2004 to 2009, based in Shanghai and led McKinsey's office in South Korea from 2000 to 2004. Barton is an author in topics of financial services and economic development in Asia. He is also a trustee of the Rhodes Trust and the Brookings Institution, and an honorary fellow at Brasenose College, Oxford.
- James Brander is a co-author of a seminal 1986 article in The American Economic Review, with Tracy R. Lewis, on “Oligopoly and Financial Structure: The Limited Liability Effect”, and worked in international trade with Barbara Spencer, particularly on the Brander Spencer model.
- Paul Beaudry is a professor and Canada Research Chair in the UBC VSE at the University of British Columbia. His main fields of research are macroeconomics, the economics of technical change and labour economics. He is also a Fellow of the Bank of Canada.
- Marina Adshade is a lecturer at VSE and is the author of The Love Market: What You Need to Know About How We Date, Mate and Marry and Dollars and Sex: How Economics Influences Sex and Love. She has also written a chapter titled Sexbot-Induced Social Change: An Economic Perspective in Robot Sex: Social and Ethical Implications by John Danaher and Neil McArthur.
- Chris Fowler is the chief operating officer of the Canadian Western Bank, a multi-billion asset Canadian bank.
- Robert C. Allen was a professor in the VSE from 1980 to 1985 and 1985–2000. He is a professor of economic history at Oxford University. He is the author of: Enclosure and the Yeoman: The Agricultural Development of the South Midlands, 1450–1850 (1992), Farm to Factory: A Re-interpretation of the Soviet Industrial Revolution (2003), The British Industrial Revolution in Global Perspective (2009). He was awarded the Ranki Prize of the Economic History Association for his 1992 and 2003 works.

== Students ==
Students at the school is represented by the Vancouver School of Economics Undergraduate Society. Student activities supported by the Vancouver School of Economics include the Iona Journal of Economics, an undergraduate economic research journal published annually.

== Faculty ==
In September 2026, the school had 50 active faculty members. Faculty members include eight researchers affiliated with the National Bureau of Economic Research, six researchers affiliated with the Canadian Institute for Advanced Research, two current and one former research fellow of the Bank of Canada, two elected fellows of the Econometric Society, four fellows of the Royal Society of Canada, and one of the Distinguished Fellows of the American Economic Association.
