= James Brander =

Canadian economist

James Alan Brander (born 1953) is a Canadian economist and a professor of Asia-Pacific International Trade, University of British Columbia. He is known as co-author of a seminal 1986 article in The American Economic Review, with Tracy R. Lewis, on "Oligopoly and Financial Structure: The Limited Liability Effect", as well as his work in international trade with Barbara Spencer, particularly the Brander–Spencer model, in which a government can enhance national welfare by subsidizing domestic firms to aid in their competition against foreign markets

== Education and work ==
Brander studied as an undergraduate at the Point Grey campus of the University of British Columbia at the UBC Department of Economics, in 1975, which is among the best in Canada; then received an MA (1978) and a PhD (1979) from Stanford University. He was an assistant professor in the Department of Economics at Queen's University from 1979 to 1984 before moving back to the University of British Columbia.

His 1981 paper with Barbara Spencer, Tariffs and the Extraction of Foreign Monopoly Rents Under Potential Entry, won the Harry Johnson Prize of the Canadian Journal of Economics. By 1998, Brander's work had been cited over 1000 times.

He is a former managing editor of the Canadian Journal of Economics (1997–2001) and a former co-editor of the Journal of International Economics (1990–96), and he was a research associate of the National Bureau of Economic Research from 1983 to 2002. He was president of the Canadian Economics Association for 2009–10, and he was awarded the association's highest academic honour when he was inducted as a CEA Fellow.

=== Economic theory ===
Brander and Lewis proposed a duopoly model in which it might be rational for the managers of a corporation to load up on debt, to a degree that would be socially dysfunctional. In the model, management might deliberately incur debts in order to wed its interests to those of the shareholders and pursue with their support a risky low-margin, high-output strategy that in turn may gain market share. This gamble has a chance of success if the other duopolist is low-risk, and would rather leave the market than engage in a price-cutting war. On the other hand, if both duopolists adopt the same approach, though, the result is that they are both worse off than if neither had. Furthermore, that result will have negative social utility—the affected market will resemble the recent airline industry in North America.

== Personal life ==
Brander grew up in Victoria, British Columbia. His wife is his collaborator, Barbara Spencer, whom he met while they were at Queen's University. He is an ice hockey fan and wrote a mathematical analysis of Vancouver's teams.

== Bibliography ==
- Brander, James A. and Jeffrey M. Perloff. 2016. Managerial Economics and Strategy. 2nd ed. Pearson:Harlow.
- Brander, James A. 2013. Government Policy towards Business. 5th ed. Wiley:Toronto.
- Brander, James A. 1986. "Rationales for Strategic Trade and Industrial Policy," in Paul R. Krugman, ed., Strategic Trade Policy and the New International Economics. MIT Press.

== See also ==
- Brander–Spencer model
