= Introduction to Economic Analysis =

Free licence university microeconomics textbook

- Author: Preston McAfee; Tracy Lewis
- Subject: Microeconomics
- Genre: Non-fiction
- Publisher: Flat World Knowledge
- Publication date: 2009
- ISBN: 1-60049-000-X

Introduction to Economic Analysis is a university microeconomics textbook by Caltech Professor Preston McAfee. It is available free of charge under Creative Commons license (an open source); under this "license that requires attribution, users can pick and choose chapters or integrate with their own material".

Introduction to Economic Analysis was the first published complete textbook being openly available online. McAfee was named SPARC innovator for the year 2009 for making the book freely accessible.

A revised edition, coauthored with Tracy Lewis of the Fuqua School of Business, was published by Flat World Knowledge and is available online from McAfee's website. A further revision was produced by Donald J. Dale.
