= Gallini =

Gallini may refer to:

- Gallini (surname), an Italian surname
- Gallini (bird), a tribe of gamebirds including francolins, bamboo partridges, and junglefowl (including the chicken)
