= Brander–Spencer model =

Economic model

The Brander–Spencer model is an economic model in international trade originally developed by James Brander and Barbara Spencer in the early 1980s. The model illustrates a situation where, under certain assumptions, a government can subsidize domestic firms to help them in their competition against foreign producers and in doing so enhances national welfare. This conclusion stands in contrast to results from most international trade models, in which government non-interference is socially optimal.

The basic model is a variation on the Stackelberg–Cournot "leader and follower" duopoly game. Alternatively, the model can be portrayed in game theoretic terms as initially a game with multiple Nash equilibria, with government having the capability of affecting the payoffs to switch to a game with just one equilibrium. Although it is possible for the national government to increase a country's welfare in the model through export subsidies, the policy is of beggar thy neighbor type. This also means that if all governments simultaneously attempt to follow the policy prescription of the model, all countries would wind up worse off.

The model was part of the "New Trade Theory" that was developed in the late 1970s and early 1980s, which incorporated then recent developments from literature on industrial organization into theories of international trade. In particular, like in many other New Trade Theory models, economies of scale (in this case, in the form of fixed entry costs) play an important role in the Brander–Spencer model.

== Entry game version ==
A simplified version of the model was popularized by Paul Krugman in the 1990s in his book Peddling Prosperity. In this set up there are two firms, one foreign and one domestic which are considering entering a new export market in a third country (or possibly the whole world). The demand in the export market is such that if only one firm enters, it will make a profit, but if they both enter each will make a loss, perhaps because of initial set up, infrastructure, product development, marketing or other fixed costs of entry. The matrix below presents a stylized example of the game that the two firms are engaged in.

	Enter	Stay Out
Enter	−10, −10	50, 0
Stay Out	0, 50	0, 0
Fig. 1: Entry game with multiple equilibria

	Enter	Stay Out
Enter	10, −10	70, 0
Stay Out	0, 50	0, 0
Fig. 2: Entry game with subsidy, single equilibrium

The available choices of the domestic firms are given on the left, while those of the foreign firm are on top. The first number in each cell denotes the payoff to the domestic firm while the second number is the payoff to the foreign firm.

The game with no government subsidy to the domestic firm is shown in Figure 1 on the left. If both firms enter, they each suffer a loss of 10 million dollars and if they both stay out of the market neither firm makes a profit or a loss. If only one firm enters however, that firm will realize a profit of 50 million dollars while the other firm will make nothing. The two Nash equilibria of this game (marked in purple) are the situations in which only one firm enters – but which firm, domestic or foreign, is indeterminate. In such a situation if the foreign firm has a slight initial advantage over the domestic firm (perhaps because it began product development earlier) the domestic firm will stay out and the foreign firm will enter. (Note: If firms choose "mixed strategies" – that is, they choose a probability with which to enter or not – then both firms may end up erroneously entering the market. According to Krugman, that kind of situation occurred in the 1970s with both Lockheed and McDonnell Douglas both simultaneously entering the market for three engine wide-body jets.)

The game changes however if the government credibly promises to subsidize the domestic firm if it enters the market, as illustrated in Figure 2. Suppose the government promises a subsidy of twenty million, regardless of whether the foreign firm also enters or not. In that case, if the foreign firm enters the domestic firm will lose ten million from entry costs but will be more than compensated by the government subsidy, ending up with a net payoff of ten million. If the foreign firm does not enter of course, it is still profitable for the domestic firm to enter. As a result, regardless of the action of the foreign firm, the domestic firm's incentive is to enter the market. Anticipating this, the foreign firm will stay out of the market itself, since otherwise it would incur a loss.

From the point of view of the domestic country, the subsidy is welfare improving. The 20 million subsidy is a transfer from the government to the firm hence it has no effect on national welfare (ignoring costs of taxation; as long as these are not too large the basic insight of the model goes through). Additionally the domestic firm gains 50 million which would have otherwise gone to the foreign firm.

== Stackelberg–Cournot version ==
The original Brander and Spencer paper presented the game in the framework of a Cournot competition model.

Letting x denote the output of the domestic firm and y denote the output of the foreign firm, the inverse demand function (price as a function of total quantity) is given by $p(x+y)$. Hence the profit function for the domestic firm is $\pi^h=xp(x+y)-c(x)+sx$ where $xp(x+y)$ is total revenue, $c(x)$ is total cost of producing x units, and s is per unit subsidy provided by the government. The profit function for the foreign firm is similar except that it does not include a subsidy, $\pi^f=yp(x+y)-c(y)$.

Each firm chooses the quantity to supply in order to maximize profits, taking the other's choice as given. The (first order) conditions for profit maximization are $xp_x+p-c_x+s=0$ for the domestic firm and $yp_{y}+p-c_{y}=0$ for the foreign firm, where subscripted variables denote partial derivatives. Solving these for y implicitly defines a best response function for each firm; $y=R1(x;s)$ and $y=R2(x)$. These are illustrated in the figure below, with the domestic firm's output on the x axis and foreign firm's output on the y axis. (Note: Additional mathematical assumptions on the inverse demand function and the cost functions are needed to ensure that the above conditions define a maximum and that the reaction functions slope downward (choices are "strategic substitutes") and that they cross. The graph illustrates the case of linear demand of the form $p = a - b(x + y)$.)

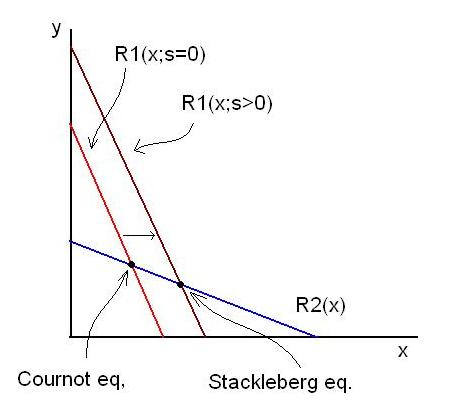

With no government subsidy (s=0) the resulting equilibrium will be the standard Cournot outcome, as shown in the graph by the intersection of the best response functions. A subsidy however has the effect of shifting the domestic firm's best response function to the right. Because its output is subsidized, the domestic firm increases production. This in turn means that the foreign firm's best response is to cut output, although not proportionally (hence, the market price falls). In the new equilibrium domestic firm produces more and foreign firm produces less.

In the model, domestic social welfare can be defined as the home firm's profit net of the subsidy (the model can be extended so that social welfare includes the firm's monopoly profit as well as the wages paid to the firm's workers; the results are qualitatively the same). It can be shown that the profit function evaluated at equilibrium quantity levels is concave in s and eventually negatively sloped. As a result, there is an "optimal subsidy" which maximizes the domestic firm's profits and hence domestic social welfare. As it turns out, if the government sets the subsidy exactly at the optimal level, the resulting equilibrium is the same as that of the "leader and follower" Stackelberg model. In that case one of the firms (in this case the domestic firm) has the ability to choose its output first. This creates the ability to credibly commit to a particular action, resulting in "first mover advantage". In the Brender–Spencer model, the government's subsidy creates this credible commitment even when the private firm does not have that ability.

== Extensions ==
=== Domestic consumption of export good ===
In standard models of international trade a fall in the price of a country's export good – a deterioration in its terms of trade – generally decreases the home country's welfare. In the Brander–Spencer model however the opposite is true. This is because in this model the markets are not perfectly competitive and the revenue from the expanded quantity sold compensates the firm for the revenue lost from the lower export price. If the good produced by the firm is also consumed domestically however the result is a bit more complicated. In the case where the firm is able to separate the home and export market (charge different prices in each with no possibility of third party arbitrage) then the level of the optimal subsidies will depend on whether marginal costs of production are constant, increasing or decreasing. The optimal subsidy level is either the same, higher or lower, respectively, compared to the level with no domestic consumption. This underscores the need on the part of the government for very precise information on industry structure and firm's cost functions.

In the more general case where the firm cannot price discriminate between domestic and foreign consumers the effects of a subsidy are less clear since both an expansion of exports and deterioration of terms of trade are present. However, Brender and Spencer show that starting out from the position of no subsidy, introducing a small subsidy can improve a country's welfare.

=== Extended government game ===
The basic model can be extended to incorporate a supra-game played by the governments of the respective countries. In this case, each government chooses the level of subsidy it will provide to its firm, taking the other government's action as given, and anticipating the reaction of the firms (in terms of quantity produced) to the subsidy. Brander and Spencer show that in the resulting Nash equilibrium the governments choose a level of subsidy that is too high and hence they do not manage to maximize social welfare. In fact, if the good produced is not consumed domestically, then the optimal level of subsidy is negative – an export tax. (Note: Brander and Spencer assume a domestic utility function of the quasilinear form, $u(x,m)=m+U(x)$, where m is a competitively produced numéraire good.) This is because the total quantity produced in the Cournot and the Stackelberg equilibrium is higher than the profit maximizing collusive monopoly level of output. Since both the home and foreign firm are producing for a third market, an export tax could reduce the total quantity produced down to the monopoly level, thus increasing both firms' profits. In that way the governments can effect a collusive outcome between their firms, at the expanse of the third country which imports the good.

== Policy applications and applied work ==
=== General difficulties ===
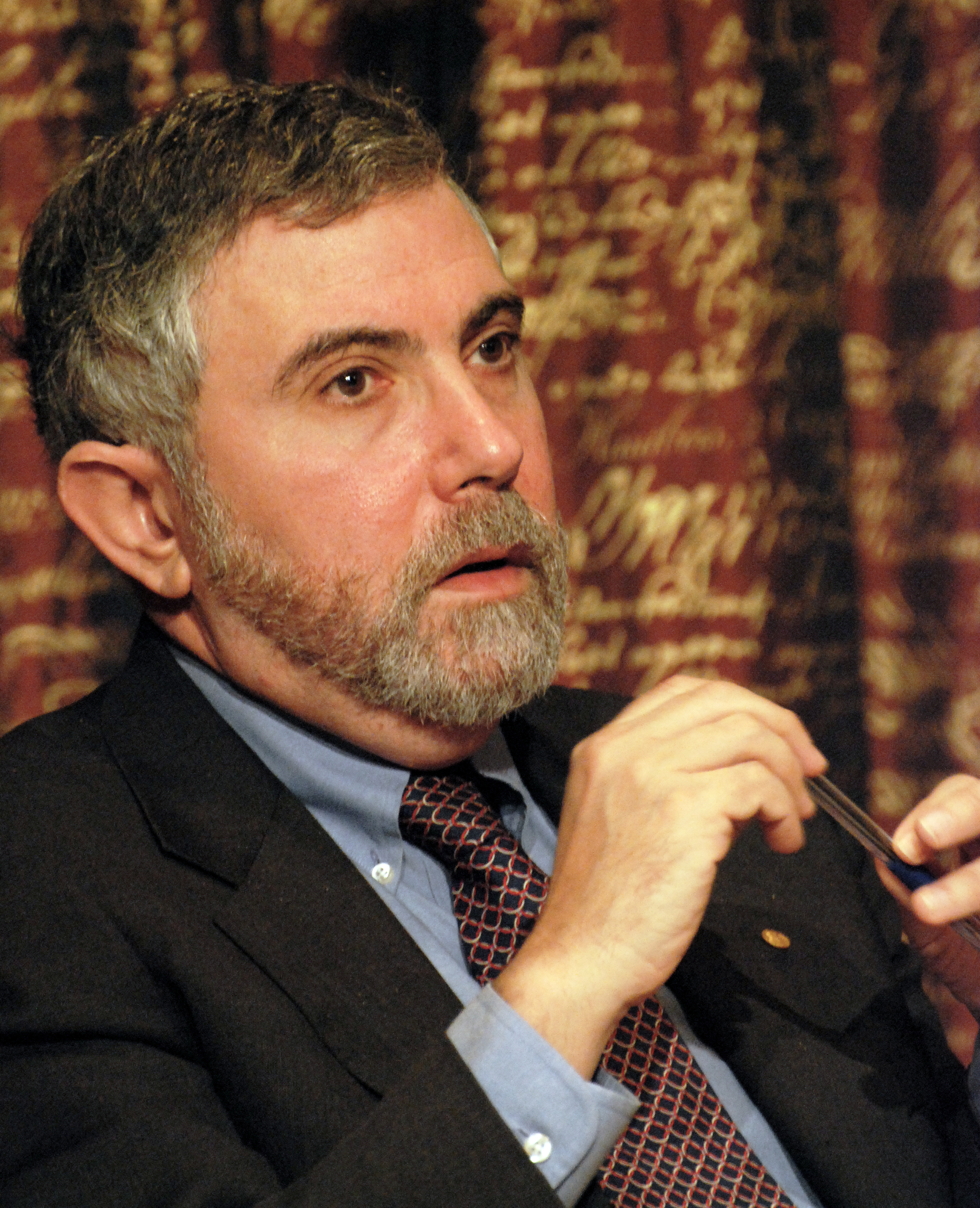
Paul Krugman popularized the model, but was also critical of it being misapplied to industries which did not meet the model's criteria.

As pointed out by Paul Krugman, the Brander–Spencer model, due to the sensitivity of the results to its assumptions, does not establish a generally applicable policy prescription in favor of government subsidies. Rather, it provides an example for when such intervention may be justifiable and points to some conditions which may favor it.

A general difficulty with the application of the model, like many game theoretic models, is that it does not easily lend itself to econometric testing and parameter estimation. As a result, the two avenues of empirical research that have been pursued in subsequent literature have been estimates of a "conjectural variation" parameter for particular industries, and calibration of the models using behavioral parameters from other studies. The former approach assumes that firms have a "conjecture" as to how the other firms will react to their own choice of output and base their decision on this belief. However, the approach is problematic, both from an analytical (it is not internally consistent) and an empirical point of view (there's no guarantee that the parameter, even if it makes conceptual sense, remains stable when a new policy – the government's subsidy – is introduced (Note: This is the same argument as that of the Lucas critique but in a specific microeconomic setting.)). Calibrations of models of industry structure on the other hand have generally found that most industry are neither Cournot (in which case the Brander–Spencer policy prescription would be an export subsidy) nor Bertrand (in which case the optimal policy is an export tax). As a result, it is hard to say in which industries exactly the Brander–Spencer policy prescription may apply.

=== Agriculture ===
Marie Thursby has used an extended version of the model to examine international trade in wheat, 60% of which is produced by the United States and Canada. Thursby includes marketing boards, possibility of a monopsony, and a variety of government policies in the analysis. She finds that while there are significant economies of scale in the industry, the barriers to entry are not high and regardless of the extent of market power that US firms have in the industry, the optimal policy is actually an export tax, rather than a subsidy.

=== Aircraft ===
In his book which presented the model to the general public, Paul Krugman used the example of the aircraft industry, with the two players being Airbus and Boeing. In fact, Krugman and Baldwin examined the industry for wide bodied aircraft in the context of the model in a 1988 paper. The authors calibrate an extended version of the model in order to examine the effect of a subsidy to Airbus by European governments, and its presence in a market which can only support two firms at most, worldwide. They find that the subsidy had an unambiguously negative effect on welfare of the United States and a positive effect on rest of the world, which benefits from lower prices. The result for Europe hinges on price elasticity of demand; for relatively inelastic demand the net effect of subsidy is positive with most of the benefits accruing to European consumers, but for elastic demand, social welfare in Europe goes down. Importantly, unlike in the baseline Brander and Spencer model, Krugman and Baldwin find that the changes to consumer surplus resulting from the subsidy and entry, dominate the effect of changes in firm profits in social welfare calculations.

Gernot Klepper, in an analysis similar to Krugman and Baldwin, has also used the Brander Spencer and other models to analyze the effects of entry into the transport aircraft industry. He included the effects of learning during the production process which depends on the scale of production. His calibrated model suggested that per unit production costs can fall by as much as 20% if total production is doubled. In that case, the entry of another firm (in this case, Airbus) into the market would decrease per firm output and reduce the learning and scale effects. In his analysis, the entry of Airbus would cause an increase in consumer surplus, but this would be smaller than the resulting loss in producer surplus.

== Criticism ==
In general, like with many of the New Trade Theory models, the results of the Brander Spencer model and the policy prescriptions it generates are very sensitive to the underlying assumptions on the nature of the industry in question, the information available to the national government, its ability to credibly commit to an action and the likely response of foreign governments. Some of these criticisms were already noted by Brander and Spencer in their paper, where they advised caution.

Further work on the model has shown that a slight difference in assumptions can produce completely different results. For example, Eaton and Grossmann showed that if the firms compete in prices rather in quantities (Bertrand competition rather than Cournot) then the optimal policy is an export tax rather a subsidy – a policy rarely used in practice, politically unpopular and contrary to protectionist sentiment which generally touted New Trade Theory models as an argument for their favored policies.

== Influence ==
The 1985 paper "Export Subsidies and International Market Share Rivalry", which presented the original version of the model, was the most cited paper in the Journal of International Economics since the inception of the journal in 1971 (as of 2000).

== Works cited ==
- Baldwin, Robert; National Bureau of Economic Research (1988). Trade policy issues and empirical analysis, Conference Report. University of Chicago press. ISBN 0-226-03607-3.
- Brander, James; Barbara Spencer (1985). "Export Subsidies and International Market Share Rivalry" (PDF). Journal of International Economics. 18 (1–2): 83–100. doi:10.1016/0022-1996(85)90006-6. S2CID 54817401.
- Cohen, Benjamin; Lipson, Charles (1999). Issues and agents in international political economy. MIT Press. ISBN 0-262-53160-7.
- Krugman, Paul (1995). Peddling prosperity: economic sense and nonsense in the age of diminished expectations. W. W. Norton & Company. ISBN 0-393-31292-5.
- Krugman, Paul; Alasdair Smith (1994). Empirical studies of strategic trade policy, National Bureau of Economic Research project report. University of Chicago Press. ISBN 0-226-45460-6.
- "Empirical Studies Of Strategic Trade Policy". CEPR Bulletin. Center for Economic Policy Research (CEPR). 1990. Archived from the original on 2011-09-27.
- Feenstra, Robert; Andy Rose (2000). "Journal of International Economics at Fifty: A Retrospective". Journal of International Economics. 50: 3–15. doi:10.1016/S0022-1996(99)00019-7.
