= Siwan Anderson =

Canadian economist and professor

- Born: Siwan Anderson
- Education: Vancouver School of Economics; University of British Columbia
- Occupation: Professor
- Known for: development economics; gender economics
- Awards: UBC Killam Research Prize; John Rae Prize
- Website: Anderson's Homepage

Siwan Anderson is a Canadian economist and professor at the Vancouver School of Economics at the University of British Columbia (UBC). Her area of focus is on development economics with a micro-level approach focusing on institutions in developing countries, and also gender economics focusing on the role of women in the economy. Siwan Anderson is also an Associate of the Canadian Institute for Advanced Research, an Associate of the Theoretical Research in Development Economics (ThReD), a Fellow of the Bureau for Research and Economic Analysis of Development (BREAD), and a Faculty Associate of the Center for Effective Global Action. Siwan Anderson is the first woman to receive the John Rae Prize from the Canadian Economics Association.

== Early life and education ==
Siwan Anderson first earned a Bachelor of Science in mathematics from the University of British Columbia in 1990, finished her master's degree two year later and completed her doctoral degree in 1999. Anderson studied mathematics during her undergraduate years, but seeking to apply these skills to social issues in a more relevant way, she was drawn to economics. When she entered graduate school, Anderson was interested in the issue of poverty, the reasons behind it and the challenges it creates for people. She eventually decided to become an economic researcher, addressing problems within the social sciences using economic tools and analysis.

== Occupation and affiliations ==
- Professor, Vancouver School of Economics, University of British Columbia
- Faculty associate, Center for Effective Global Action, Berkeley, California
- Fellow, Bureau for Research and Economic Analysis of Development (BREAD)
- Associate, Theoretical Research in Development Economics (ThReD)
- Co-Editor, Journal of Development Economics
- Editorial board, Journal of Globalization and Development
- Editorial board, Ideas for India

=== Previous positions ===
- 2008-2016: Associate professor, University of British Columbia
- 2007-2014: Associate editor, Indian Review of Growth and Development
- 2004-2012: Affiliate, BREAD
- 1999-2002: Assistant professor, Tilburg University, The Netherlands
- 1999: Research fellow, University of Melbourne, Australia
- 1998: Research fellow, University of Namur, Belgium

== Research ==
Siwan Anderson's economic research mainly focuses on the role of micro-level institutions in developing countries such as India, and the role of gender within social science. Most of Anderson's analyses in developing countries tackle the issues between economic development and the function of institutions and female participation. One of her projects aims the reveal "the solution to the missing women puzzle in India." Anderson explains that she wants to "look beyond the explanation of an elevated rate of female infanticides to see what role widowhood might also play" in the economy. She also works on projects in India that examines the rural political institutions. Anderson and her colleagues Ashok Kotwal and Patrick François "have collected data from interviews with 9,000 households on the subject of the new unique identification system that is being implemented across the country." Indeed, Siwan Anderson's researches reveal that women in development economy play a crucial role in constructing the conformation of institutions within society, and also enhancing female endorsement in economic growth positively.

== Selected scholarships ==
=== "Property Rights Over Marital Transfers" (2015) ===
Together with her colleague Chris Bidner, Siwan Anderson examines women's property rights after marriage in developing countries. With a focus on dowry, the study reveals the incentives of allocating property rights between the married couples, as well as the shifting bargaining power within the marriage market. They utilize economic tools and models to clarify and formalize the "dual role" of dowry in the marriage: the dowry represents both a premortem bequest and a market clearing price to compete in the marriage market. The study explains that women's property rights over the dowry depreciate along with the development, and also suggests that since increased direct economic returns for women enhances the welfare of women, it is essential to promote the financial returns to determine women's welfare and legal rights.

=== "Suicide and Property Rights in India" (2015) ===
This paper studies the significance of female property rights on male and female suicide rates in India. Siwan Anderson and her co-researcher Garance Genicot utilize state-level variation in legal changes to women's property rights to examine this issue.

Siwan is known for her research in developing countries. She discovered that enhanced property rights for women are correlates with a decrease in the difference of suicide rates between female and male, but an increase in suicides in both genders. The vast majority of people who committed suicide are in a married relationship. The paper also provides suggestive evidence that marital discord can be a potential reason for explaining that improving female property rights raises suicide rates. However, this paper is not suggesting that enhancing women's ownership over their properties is an undesirable channel.

With theoretical models and empirical analyses, the study shows how establishing the inheritance rights of women can raise conflict within households and has a correlation in the increase of suicide rates of both genders, highlighting the importance of gender equality and providing help for women seeking to leave unhappy marriages.

=== "The Age Distribution of Missing Women in India" (2012) ===
In this article, Anderson and her colleague Debraj Ray examine the concept of "Missing Women," which was first proposed by Indian economist Amartya Sen. Some estimates suggest that the number of women who could potentially be alive is over 25 million. In other words, there are more than two million women "missing" in India in a given year. Anderson and Ray analyze the phenomenon by dividing up the age group across the regions in India, and the findings are shocking.

Foremost, the majority of missing women in India die in their adulthood. The research estimates that roughly 12% of missing women die at birth, 25% in childhood, and 43% in adulthood. Additionally, the distribution of missing women by age group varies across different states in India. The southern states have the lowest number of missing women and make up only 10% of the national total. The remaining part of the data distributes throughout the rest of the country. Since the distribution of missing women varies between states and regions, it is difficult to explain such a phenomenon in India theoretically.

Consequently, the research reveals that the severity of the life-threatening dilemma adult women face in India is no less than young girls.

== Grants and awards ==
=== Notable awards and honours ===
- 2007: UBC Killam Research Prize
- 2010: Weatherall Visiting Fellowship at Queen's University
- 2018: John Rae Prize from the Canadian Economics Association

Research Grants and Honours
Year	Grants	Institutions
2018-2019	EDI Research Grant	Department for International Development
2018-2019	Monash University Internal Research Grant	Monash University
2018-2019	CERC Internal Research Grant	Canada Excellence Research Chairs
2017-2019	EDI Research Grant	Department for International Development
2015-2017	IDRC Research Grant	International Development Research Centre
2015-2019	SSHRC Insight Grant	The Social Sciences and Humanities Research Council of Canada
2014-2016	Hampton Research Grant	University of British Columbia
2014-2015	IGC Research Grant	International Growth Centre
2012-2013	IGC Research Grant	International Growth Centre
2012-2016	IDRC Research Grant	International Development Research Centre
2011-2012	IGC Research Grant	International Growth Centre
2011-2012	UNSW Internal Grant	University of New South Wales
2010	Weatherall Visiting Fellowship	Queen's University
2009-2012	SSHRC Research Grant	The Social Sciences and Humanities Research Council of Canada
2007-2010	SSHRC Research Grant	The Social Sciences and Humanities Research Council of Canada
2007	UBC Killam Research Prize	University of British Columbia
2006-2009	SSHRC Research Grant	The Social Sciences and Humanities Research Council of Canada
2004-2006	HSS Hampton Large Grant	University of British Columbia
2003-2006	SSHRC Research Grant	The Social Sciences and Humanities Research Council of Canada
2003-2004	Peter Wall Early Career Scholar	The Peter Wall Institute for Advanced Studies at the University of British Columbia
2002-2003	HSS Hampton Small Grant	University of British Columbia

== Publications ==
=== Academic publications ===
- Anderson, Siwan, and Debraj Ray. "Missing Unmarried Women." Journal of the European Economic Association (forthcoming).
- Anderson, Siwan. "Legal Origins and Female HIV." American Economic Review (forthcoming).
- Anderson, Siwan, et al. "Distress in Marathaland." Economic and Political Weekly, Volume L1(51), December 2016, p. 14 -16.
- Anderson, Siwan, and Chris Bidner. "Property Rights over Marital Transfers." Quarterly Journal of Economics, Volume 130(3), August 2015, p. 1421-1484.
- Anderson, Siwan, et al. "One Kind of Democracy: Implementing MGNREGS." Economic and Political Weekly, Volume L, No. 26-27, 27 June 2015, p. 44-48.
- Anderson, Siwan, et al. "Clientelism in Indian Villages." American Economic Review, Volume 105(6), June 2015, p. 1780-1816.
- Anderson, Siwan, and Garance Genicot. "Suicide and Property Rights in India." Journal of Development Economics, Volume 114, May 2015, p. 64-78.
- Anderson, Siwan. "Human capital effects of marriage payments." IZA World of Labor, September 2014, p. 77.
- Anderson, Siwan, and Debraj Ray. "The Age Distribution of Missing Women in India." Economic and Political Weekly, Vol. XLVII, No. 47-48, December 2012, p. 87-95.
- Anderson, Siwan. "Caste as an Impediment to Trade." American Economic Journal: Applied Economics, Volume 3, January 2011, p. 239-263.
- Anderson, Siwan, and Debraj Ray. "Missing Women: Age and Disease." Review of Economic Studies, Volume 77, October 2010, p. 1262-1300.
- Anderson, Siwan, and Mukesh Eswaran. "Determinants of female autonomy: evidence from Bangladesh." Journal of Development Economics, 90(2), November 2009, p. 179-191.
- Anderson, Siwan, et al. "Enforcement and organizational design in informal savings groups." Journal of Development Economics, September 2009, 90(1), p. 14-23.
- Anderson, Siwan, and Patrick Francois. "Formalizing Informal Institutions: Theory and Evidence from a Kenyan Slum." Institutions and Economic Growth, edited by Elhanan Helpman, Harvard University Press, 2008, p. 409-451.
- Anderson, Siwan. "The economics of dowry and brideprice." Journal of Economic Perspectives, 21(4), Fall 2007, p. 151-174.
- Anderson, Siwan. "Why the marriage squeeze cannot cause dowry inflation", Journal of Economic Theory,137(1), Fall 2007, p. 140-152.
- Anderson, Siwan. "The Economics of Roscas and Intra-household Resource Allocation", Quarterly Journal of Economics, August 2002 Vol.117

=== Other works ===
- Anderson, Siwan, and Patrick Francois. "Electoral Reservations and Leadership Quality in Village India." VoxDev, 23 October 2017.
- Anderson, Siwan, and Patrick Francois. "Political Reservations and the Quality of Governance." Ideas for India, 23 October 2017.
- Anderson, Siwan. "Dowries and Other Marital Transfers." International Encyclopedia of the Social and Behavioral Sciences. 2nd ed., 2015, Elsevier, p. 641-644.
- Anderson, Siwan, and Garance Genicot. "Property Rights, Household Conflict and Suicide in India." Ideas for India, 9 July 2015. Reprinted in Live Mint.
- Anderson, Siwan. "Developmental Economist Siwan Anderson provides a view about violence against women in India." CIFAR Exchange, 19 February 2013.
- Anderson, Siwan, and Debraj Ray. "India's Missing Women by Age and State." Ideas for India, 11 January 2013.
- Anderson, Siwan. "Caste Dominance in Rural India: Cause and Effect." Ideas for India, 16 August 2012.
- Anderson, Siwan. "Roscas." International Encyclopedia of the Social Sciences, William Darity Jr. ed., Macmillan Press. 2008.

=== Media ===
Live radio interviews with Siwan Anderson:

- Link Asia (San Francisco, 2013)
- CBC Morning Show (Vancouver, 2009)
- CBC Sunday Edition with Michael Enright (Toronto, 2009)
- New Classical 96.3 FM (Toronto, 2009)
- The New AM 740 (Toronto, 2009)
