= Nancy Gallini =

American economist

Nancy T. Gallini is an American economist, professor emeritus, researcher, and author. She is a professor emeritus at the Vancouver School of Economics based in the University of British Columbia. She has served on multiple editorial boards such as American Economic Review, International Journal of Industrial Organization, Journal of Economic Literature and the Journal of Industrial Economics. In 2008, Dr. Gallini was appointed as a member to the Social Sciences and Humanities Research Council of Canada. From 2011-2014 Dr. Gallini served on the executive council for the Canadian Economic Association. Her research "focuses on the economics of intellectual property, competition policy, strategic alliances, licensing, and optimal patent policy". She is the co-author of Competition Policy and Intellectual Property Rights in the Knowledge-Based Economy. She has won numerous awards and a fellowship throughout her career. She has received 8 research grants from the Social Science and Humanities Research Council. These grants are one SSHRC Leave Fellowship, one SSHRC Post-Doctoral Fellowship and six SSHRC Research Grants.

== Education ==
Dr. Gallini obtained both her B.A in Mathematics (1973) and Master of Arts in Economics (1974) from the University of Missouri. She went to pursue her doctorate from the University of California, Berkeley, where she received her Ph.D. in Resource Economics.

== Career ==
=== Academic positions ===
She started her economics career at the University of Toronto. She became a faculty member in the Department of Economics from 1979-2002. She then went onto become the Chair of the Economics department from 1995-2000. Upon leaving her position at the University of Toronto she moved to Vancouver and became the Dean of Arts at the University of British Columbia from 2002-2010.

She has been a visiting professor at numerous post-secondary institutions such as: "Hitotsubashi University (Japan), the University of New South Wales (Australia), the University of Auckland (New Zealand), Delhi School of Economics (India), the University of Geneva (Switzerland), the Centre de Recherche en Économie et Statistique (France), and Yale Law School (United States of America)".

=== Editorial boards ===
Editorial Board Membership
| Year | Economic Journals |
|---|---|
| 1998 - 2002 | Journal of Economic Literature |
| 1993 - 1996 | International Journal of Industrial Organization |
| 1993 - 1996 | Journal of Industrial Economics |
| 1992 - 1995; 1995 - 1998 | American Economic Review |

=== Memberships and appointments ===
Dr. Gallini was appointed President to the Canadian Council Dean of Arts, Humanities and Social Sciences from 2005 to 2006. From 2006 to 2010, she was a member of the Women's Health Research Institute. In 2008, Dr. Gallini was appointed to the Social Science and Humanities Research Council of Canada. She was the leader representative for the University of British Columbia until 2010. She served on the Museum of Anthropology advisory board from 2011 to 2012. She was appointed to serve as a governing member on the Mitacs Research Council from 2011 to 2014. From 2011 to 2014 she also served on the Canadian Economic Association executive council. Dr. Gallini is also an Advisory Board member for the Neglected Global Disease Initiative at the University of British Columbia.

== Research and academic works ==
=== Select scholarships ===
==== "Competition Policy, Patent Pools and Copyright Collectives (2011) ====
The term Intellectual Property has various protection mechanisms that range from patents, copyrights, industrial design rights, trademarks and trade secrets. Due to the differing protection mechanism, each one has their own protection duration, criteria and purpose. Dr. Gallini's paper "analyzes and compares two types of cooperative agreements that combine Intellectual Property: patent pools and copyright collectives". Since each protection mechanism has its own protection duration, criteria and purpose, Dr. Gallini questions "what are those differences and specific circumstances that would require a different (e.g., more or less restrictive) approach toward patent pools and collectives?". To answer the question she "evaluate[s] antitrust policy in three environments in which owners of the intellectual property: (1) are vertically integrated into the downstream (product) market; (2) face competition in the upstream (input) market and (3) own downstream products that do not require a license on the pooled IP but compete with products that do".

Dr. Gallini's paper found that even though there were different antitrust concerns between patent pools and collectives, "the welfare consequences and... recommended antitrust treatment is surprisingly uniform". In the first environment, patent pools and copyright collectives continue to be efficient for some members that are vertically integrated if they are welfare-enhancing when there is the absence of vertical integration. Second, competition between firm in the "upstream market is mitigated if members retain the right to license separately outside of the pool or collective". Finally, in the third environment, pools and collectives become welfare enhancing when they face downstream market competition, "even if some members have ownership stake in those competing products".

==== "Intellectual Property: When is it the Best Incentive System?" (2002) ====
Nancy Gallini and Suzanne Scotchmer review the "economic reasoning that supports patent and other intellectual property over the alternatives". Currently the argument against intellectual property is that it hinders future innovation. There are some inventions that do not fall under patents, but received "sui generis" protection. Which raises the question: "are there natural market forces that protect investors so that formal protections or other incentives are not necessary?" Or is intellectual property the best system?

Dr. Gallini and Dr. Scotchmer found that intellectual property is the best protection mechanism "when value and cost are not observable by the sponsor". Their paper disregards the argument that intellectual property hinders innovation. Rather, intellectual property promotes innovation because it is conditional on the invention or product's success. Their second conclusion is that "neither IP nor prizes can aggregate the information that is decentralized among firms". Firms that obtain prizes or differ in prizes receive[d] can be improved "on a simple prize system or patent system". But there should have been negotiations beforehand to select the favored firms.

==== "Patent Policy and Costly Imitation" (1992) ====
Mukesh Eswaran and Nancy Gallini extend the "theory of optimal patents to allow for costly imitation of patented innovation". Patents are designed to promote research and to encourage the creation of new inventions "so that others can use and build upon research results". Therefore, patents have two outcomes: the invention is beyond the means of imitation and is not a threat to the innovator or the invention can easily be imitated and becomes a threat to the innovator. The author's state that the more common case between the two is that the imitation is more costly but not prohibitively. They conduct a study where they model optimal patent policy with costly imitation that endogenizes imitation.

Their study found that innovations that have patent designs discourage all imitation because it is too costly. The second result they found was that an innovation that had a broad patent (meaning that there was no imitation) "adjusted to generate the desired return from research". They make several recommendations to avoid costly imitations. The first being to give shorter patent life and "the innovator could license its innovation to discourage imitation". They acknowledge the limitation of their model and call for the model to be "extended to examine a sequence of improvements of the original innovation or a sequence of applications of the original innovation in distinct markets". The last recommendation is to try and examine the optimality of the patent when only a single uniform policy is applied to various innovations with different social values.

==== "Producer-Consumer Trade-Offs in Export Cartels: The Wheat Cartel Case" (1980) ====
Due to the formation of the Organization of Petroleum Exporting Countries (OPEC), there has been a discussion to form a wheat cartel by the major wheat-producing countries: the United States, Canada, Australia and Argentina. Colin Carter, Nancy Gallini and Andrew Schmitz "consider a market in which the commodity in question has a relatively large domestic demand component" where there is a sharp distinction "between a producer export cartel and a government export cartel". They state that in this model, the producer export cartel "may lose from a government cartel". Their paper uses the model above to conduct a study on the world wheat economy and they find that the above outcome is true and that "there is a strong possibility that producers would lose from a government wheat cartel if there are decreasing returns in production". The only way to make up for the lost profits for the producer export cartel is if the government was to tax the consumers. If they do not, there is no welfare gain to the producers. They do warn that their model is under the free trade model and that there is the assumption that importers do not retaliate. Consumers are the true winners in this model.

=== Publications ===
==== Selected journal publications ====
- Gallini, Nancy, Robert E. W. Hancock, Richard Lester, Brett Sharp, and Kishor M. Wasan. “Implementation and Impact of the Global Access Principles at the University of British Columbia: Current Successes and Future Challenges.” Frontiers in Pharmacology 14 (December 2023): 1271618. https://doi.org/10.3389/fphar.2023.1271618.
- Gallini, Nancy, and Aidan Hollis. "To Sell or Scale Up: Canada's Patent Strategy in a Knowledge Economy." (2019).
- Eswaran, Mukesh, and Nancy Gallini. "Can competition and Patent Policies Avert the Antibiotic crisis?" Canadian Public Policy 45, no. 1 (2019): 74-92.
- Gallini, Nancy. "Do patents work? Thickets, trolls and antibiotic resistance," Canadian Journal of Economics, Canadian Economics Association, vol. 50(4), pages 893-926, November 2017.
- Gallini, Nancy. "Cooperating with Competitors: Patent Pooling and Choice of a New Standard." International Journal of Industrial Organization, vol. 36, 2014, pp. 4–21.
- Gallini, Nancy. "Competition Policy, Patent Pools and Copyright Collectives." Review of Economic Research on Copyright Issues, vol. 8, no. 2, 2011, pp. 3–34.
- Gallini, Nancy, and Suzanne Scotchmer. "Intellectual Property: When is it the Best Incentive System?" Innovation Policy and the Economy, vol. 2, 2002, pp. 51–77.
- Gallini, Nancy T. "The Economics of Patents: Lessons from Recent U.S. Patent Reform." The Journal of Economic Perspectives, vol. 16, no. 2, 2002, pp. 131–154.
- Gallini, Nancy T., and Aidan Hollis. "A Contractual Approach to the Gray Market." International Review of Law & Economics, vol. 19, no. 1, 1999, pp. 1–21.
- Eswaran, Mukesh, and Nancy T. Gallini. “Patent Policy and the Direction of Technological Change.” The RAND Journal of Economics, vol. 27, no. 4, 1996, pp. 722–746.
- Gallini, Nancy T., and Nancy A. Lutz. “Dual Distribution and Royalty Fees in Franchising.” Journal of Law, Economics, & Organization, vol. 8, no. 3, 1992, pp. 471–501
- Gallini, Nancy T. "Patent Policy and Costly Imitation." The RAND Journal of Economics, vol. 23, no. 1, 1992, pp. 52–63.
- Gallini, Nancy T., and Brian D. Wright. "Technology Transfer Under Asymmetric Information." The RAND Journal of Economics, vol. 21, no. 1, 1990, pp. 147–160.
- Berkowitz, Michael K., Gallini, Nancy T., Miller, Eric J., and Robert A. Wolfe. "Disaggregate Analysis of the Demand for Gasoline." Canadian Journal of Economics, vol. 23, no. 2, 1990, pp. 253–275.
- Gallini, Nancy, and Larry Karp. "Sales and Consumer Lock-in." Economica, vol. 56, no. 223, 1989, pp. 279–294.
- Farrell, Joseph, and Nancy T. Gallini. "Second-Sourcing as a Commitment: Monopoly Incentives to Attract Competition." The Quarterly Journal of Economics, vol. 103, no. 4, 1988, pp. 673–694.
- Berkowitz, Michael K., Gallini, Nancy T., Miller, Eric J., and Robert A. Wolfe. "Forecasting Vehicle Holdings and Usage with a Disaggregate Choice Model." Journal of Forecasting, vol. 6, no. 4, 1987, pp. 249–269.
- Gallini, Nancy T., and Yehuda Kotowitz. "Optimal R and D Processes and Competition." Economica, vol. 52, no. 207, 1985, pp. 321–334.
- Gallini, Nancy T., and Ralph A. Winter. "Licensing in the Theory of Innovation." The RAND Journal of Economics, vol. 16, no. 2, 1985, pp. 237–252.
- Gallini, Nancy T. "Deterrence by Market Sharing: A Strategic Incentive for Licensing." The American Economic Review, vol. 74, no. 5, 1984, pp. 931–941.
- Gallini, Nancy T., and Ralph A. Winter. "On Vertical Control in Monopolistic Competition." International Journal of Industrial Organization, vol. 1, no. 3, 1983, pp. 275–286.
- Gallini, Nancy, Tracy Lewis, and Roger Ware. "Strategic Timing and Pricing of a Substitute in a Cartelized Resource Market." The Canadian Journal of Economics / Revue Canadienne d'Economique, vol. 16, no. 3, 1983, pp. 429–446.
- Gallini, Nancy T. "Demand for Gasoline in Canada." The Canadian Journal of Economics / Revue Canadienne d'Economique, vol. 16, no. 2, 1983, pp. 299–324.
- Gallini, Nancy T. "Sequential Development of Correlated Projects: An Application to Coal Liquefaction." Energy Economics, vol. 5, no. 1, 1983, pp. 37–48.
- Carter, Colin, Nancy Gallini, and Andrew Schmitz. "Producer-Consumer Trade-Offs in Export Cartels: The Wheat Cartel Case." American Journal of Agricultural Economics, vol. 62, no. 4, 1980, pp. 812–818.

==== Book ====
- Anderson, Robert D., Nancy T Gallini. Competition Policy and Intellectual Property Rights in the Knowledge-Based Economy. University of Calgary Press, Calgary, 1998;2000;.

== Grants and awards ==
Awards and Fellowships
| Year | Award/Fellowship | Institution |
|---|---|---|
| 2010 | Margaret Fulton Award | University of British Columbia |
| 2002, 2005, 2008 | Just Desserts Awards | The Alma Mater Society at University of British Columbia |
| 2001 | Distinguished Lecturer | Industry Canada |
| 1998 | Olin Fellowship | Yale Law School |

Research Grants
| Year | Grant | Institution |
|---|---|---|
| 2001-2004 | SSHRC Research Grant | Social Sciences and Humanities Research Council |
| 1994-1997 | SSHRC Research Grant | Social Sciences and Humanities Research Council |
| 1991-1994 | SSHRC Research Grant | Social Sciences and Humanities Research Council |
| 1990-1991 | SSHRC Research Grant | Social Sciences and Humanities Research Council |
| 1988-1989 | SSHRC Research Grant | Social Sciences and Humanities Research Council |
| 1986-1987 | SSHRC Leave Fellowship | Social Sciences and Humanities Research Council |
| 1983-1984 | SSHRC Research Grant | Social Sciences and Humanities Research Council |
| 1981-1982 | SSHRC Post-Doctoral Fellowship | Social Sciences and Humanities Research Council |
