= Rhys Mendes =

Canadian economist and central banker

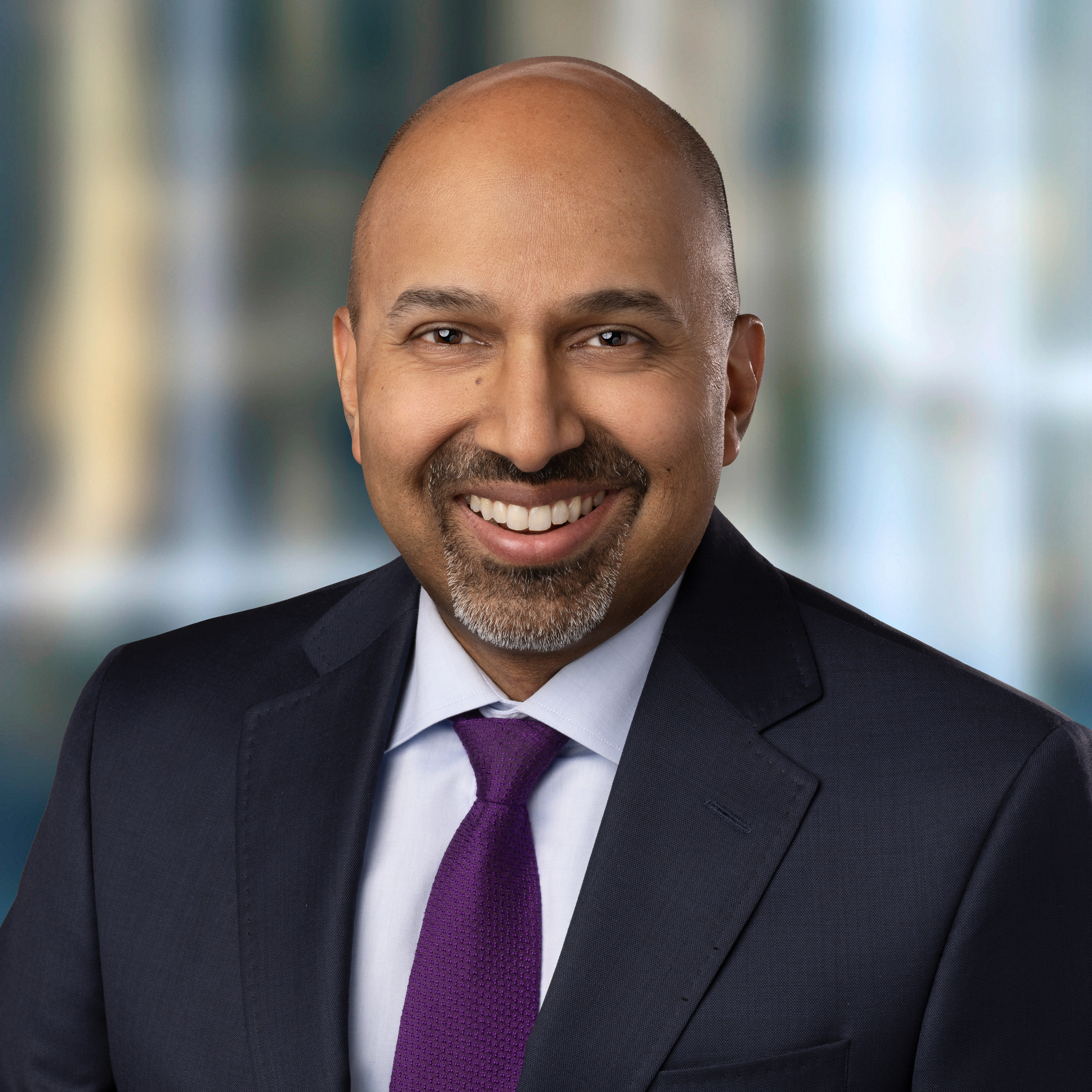
- Rhys Mendes, Deputy Governor of the Bank of Canada
- Born: Richmond Hill, Ontario, Canada
- Education: York University (BA), University of Toronto (MA, PhD)
- Occupations: Economist, central banker, public servant

Rhys R. Mendes is a Canadian economist who served as a Deputy Governor of the Bank of Canada from July 2023 to April 2026. He oversaw the Bank’s economic and financial research, its analysis of international economic developments, and he served as the G7/G20 Central Bank Deputy for Canada. He was a member of the Bank’s Governing Council, which is responsible for monetary policy and financial system stability. Mendes is the first non-white person to be appointed to the Bank of Canada’s interest-rate-setting Governing Council. He is currently a Senior Fellow at the C.D. Howe Institute.

== Early life and education ==
Rhys Mendes was born in Richmond Hill, Ontario. He earned a Bachelor of Arts (Honours) in Economics from York University, and subsequently completed a Master’s and PhD in Economics at the University of Toronto. His doctoral dissertation is titled Information, Central Bank Communication, and Aggregate Fluctuations (2008). It analyzes imperfect-information models of the business cycle, and the interaction between monetary policy and central bank communications.

== Career ==
=== Early career ===
Mendes joined the Bank of Canada in 2004. He has held progressively more senior roles, becoming Deputy Managing Director of the Canadian Economic Analysis Department in 2013, Managing Director of Economic and Financial Research in 2016, and Managing Director of International Economic Analysis in 2017. In these positions he led work in macroeconomic modelling and international policy analysis, and contributed to the five-year reviews of Canada’s monetary policy framework.

=== Assistant Deputy Minister ===
From 2021 until 2023, Mendes was on secondment to the Department of Finance Canada, where he was Assistant Deputy Minister of Finance for Economic Policy. He served under former Deputy Minister of Finance Michael Sabia.

On 17 November 2022, Mendes appeared as a witness before the Public Order Emergency Commission examining the federal government’s decision to invoke the Emergencies Act during the 2022 Canada convoy protests. As Assistant Deputy Minister for Economic Policy, Mendes was called to explain Finance Canada’s assessment of the protests’ economic consequences. In his testimony, Mendes stated that the border blockades had only a limited macroeconomic impact because they were short-lived and did not spread. However, Mendes emphasized that if the blockades had spread or persisted, they would have had a major impact on economic activity. He also noted that the reputational damage was already mounting. Mendes’s evidence was referenced in the Commission’s final report as part of its review of the government’s economic rationale for invoking emergency powers.

=== Deputy Governor ===
On 17 July 2023, Mendes succeeded Paul Beaudry as Deputy Governor of the Bank of Canada, joining the Governing Council and assuming responsibility for the Bank’s research and international analysis. Mendes also serves as the Bank of Canada's G7 and G20 Deputy and is an official member of the Bellagio Group.

On 26 November 2024, Mendes delivered a speech entitled “Sticking the Landing – Keeping Inflation at 2%” to the Greater Charlottetown Area Chamber of Commerce. He highlighted the role of monetary policy in returning inflation to target following its post-pandemic surge. On 2 October 2025, at the Ivey Business School in London, Ontario, Mendes delivered a speech titled “Underlying inflation: Separating the signal from the noise”, detailing the Bank’s method for assessing underlying inflation. He distinguished the general concept of underlying inflation from specific measures of core inflation and he noted that any core measure "however well designed, will, at times, send misleading signals."

Mendes left his post at the Bank of Canada on 10 April 2026 to move with his family to Toronto. Bank of Canada Governor Tiff Macklem said of Mendes's time as Deputy Governor: “The Bank has greatly benefited from Rhys’s leadership and expertise on the global stage. Rhys has been instrumental in shaping the policy agenda for Canada’s G7 Presidency last year, and for strengthening cooperation among central banks...This work has initiated changes that will continue to influence policy in the years ahead.”

== Written work ==
Mendes has written on a range of monetary policy topics, including:

- The design of monetary policy frameworks.
- The zero lower bound on interest rates.
- Forward guidance.

== See also ==
- Bank of Canada
- Michael Sabia
- Paul Beaudry
