= Gallini (surname) =

Gallini is an Italian surname. Notable people with the surname include:

- Giovanni Gallini (1728–1805), Italian dancer
- Mo Gallini (born 1966), American actor
- Nancy Gallini, American economist and author
- Pina Gallini (1888–1974), Italian film actress
