= Acmetal =

Currency proposed by Nursultan Nazarbayev

Acmetal, alternatively Akmetal or "AC metal", meaning "peak capital" or "best capital", is a universal currency that was proposed by Kazakhstan's President Nursultan Nazarbayev.

== Etymology ==
Akmetal is a portmanteau of the Greek word “acme” – the highest point or zenith – and “capital.”

== Reaction ==
A one-global currency prompts the creation of a one-global central bank to manage the currency, thereby superseding the authority of national central banks like the Federal Reserve in the United States and the European Central Bank.

The A.P. said: Nazarbayev's proposal has raised eyebrows in some quarters, but the idea was embraced by Robert Mundell, who won the Nobel prize for economics in 1999 for helping lay the theoretical groundwork for Europe's single currency. “It would be a very good idea if the G-20 took that idea up in London,” Mundell said.

The International Monetary Fund said that the currency idea was "interesting, but poorly explored".
