= Garance Genicot =

Belgian economist

Garance Genicot (born in 1974) is a Belgian economist and associate professor of economics at Georgetown University. She is a member of the Core Group at Theoretical Research in Development Economics (ThReD), a research associate at the National Bureau of Economic Research (NBER) Development Economics Program, a research associate at the Center for Economic and Policy Research (CPER) in both the Political Economy Program and in the Development Economics Program, a Fellow at the Bureau for Research and Economic Analysis of Development (BREAD) and a research fellow at the IZA Institute. From 2013 to 2018, she served as an External Member of the World Bank Research Management Committee. A more detailed overview of her work can be found on RePEc., Research Papers in Economics.

== Selected Research ==
Genicot's research focuses on risk-sharing, intra-household bargaining, informal credit markets, social networks, and inequality. Her highly cited work on group formation and networks focuses on how the interplay of personal incentives and group or network incentives impact economic outcomes and has applications in a variety of fields within economics, such as economic development, conflict, and labor economics. She studied the relationship between improved property rights for women in India and the incidence of suicide among both men and women.

Her work with her Ph.D. advisor, Kaushik Basu and Nobel-winning economist Joseph Stiglitz studies the responsiveness of labor supply to wages, an idea that is central to the classical theory of economics. They argue that at low wage levels, households are financially insecure and would, therefore, be willing to supply more labor to hedge themselves against economic shocks. This is called the “added labor effect” and has important implications for the ongoing minimum wage debate.

Her work on aspirations and inequality with Debraj Ray shows that aspirations can inspire but also frustrate. Their work shows the discouraging impact of aspirations that are too far from a person's situation. This study has wide implications in developing policy, especially in terms of education investments. In Aspirations and Economic Behavior, the same authors provide a review of the literature on aspirations and apply their model to important development issues such as fertility choice and conflict.

Another important focus of Genicot's research revolves around gender issues. In work with Siwan Anderson, she shows that increased property rights for women did increase the suicides rates and the incidence of wife-beating in India. Improvements in property rights for women can overall benefit women. At the same time, these improvements, by giving more voice and more decision power to women, can also be a source of conflict within families. This article was featured in an article in Ideas for India. In recent work with Maria Henandez-de-Benito, she shows how patriarchal norms persist and affect women's right to land in Tanzania.

Her work on Tolerance and Compromise in Social Network models how people may want to compromise on their identity to make friends and "belong"(See Twitter tread). In this important work, she shows how relatively intolerant individuals are key bridges in social networks. As a result, having systematically less tolerance at the extremes lead to the absence of reciprocal compromise and polarization. While intolerance among moderates helps cohesion.

Sense has a recent profile of some of Genicot's work in a podcast.

== Editorial Work ==
Garance Genicot serves as a co-editor for Quantitative Economics. She has also served as an Associate Editor for the Journal of Development Economics and as an Associate Editor for the Berkeley Electronic Journal for Theoretical Economics. She has refereed numerous works for leading academic journals in economics.

== Education and Biography ==
Born in Belgium, Garance Genicot completed her undergraduate studies in Economics at the Université de Liège, Belgium, in 1995. She then received her Ph.D. in economics from Cornell University, Ithaca, New York, USA.

Genicot has held positions at the University of California, Irvine. She has held Visiting Assistant Professor positions at Massachusetts Institute of Technology, Princeton University, New York University, London School of Economics and University College of London. She was a Visiting Faculty member at the World Bank in 2011. She has received research fellowships at the Russell Sage Foundation and the John D. & Catherine T. MacArthur Foundation Page 21 In 2016 and 2021, Genicot was a visiting professor at AMSE, at Aix-Marseille University.

== Selected works ==
- Genicot, Garance "Tolerance and Compromise in Social Networks", Journal of Political Economy 130 (1), 2022
- Genicot, Garance, and Debraj Ray. "Aspirations in Economics: a Review", Annual Reviews of Economics 12, pp 715–746, 2020.
- Genicot, Garance, and Debraj Ray. "Inequality and Aspirations." Econometrica 85, (2), 489–519, 2017.
- Genicot, Garance and Siwan Anderson, "Suicides and Property Rights in India", Journal of Development Economics 114, pp. 64–78, 2015.
- Genicot, Garance, and Debraj Ray. "Group formation in risk-sharing arrangements." The Review of Economic Studies 70.1 (2003): 87–113.
- Bloch, Francis, Garance Genicot, and Debraj Ray. "Informal insurance in social networks." Journal of Economic Theory 143.1 (2008): 36–58.
- Sahn, David E., Stephen D. Younger, and Garance Genicot. "The demand for health care services in rural Tanzania." Oxford Bulletin of Economics and Statistics 65.2 (2003): 241–260.
- Attanasio, O., Barr, A., Cardenas, J. C., Genicot, G., & Meghir, C. (2012). Risk pooling, risk preferences, and social network. American Economic Journal: Applied Economics, 4(2), 134–167.
