= Marcus Fleming =

British economist (1911–1976)

John Marcus Fleming (13 March 1911 – 3 February 1976) was a British economist.

Fleming was educated at Bathgate Academy and the University of Edinburgh, the Graduate Institute of International Studies in Geneva, and the London School of Economics. In his early career he worked for the Economic and Financial Organization of the League of Nations, before becoming a civil servant during World War II at the Ministry of Economic Warfare.

After the War, he was the deputy director of the research department of the International Monetary Fund for many years; he was already a member of this department during the period of Canadian economist Robert Mundell's affiliation. At approximately the same time as Mundell, Fleming presented similar research on stabilization policy in open economies. As a result, today's textbooks refer to the Mundell–Fleming model. Mundell's contribution, which assumes perfect rather than imperfect capital mobility is, however, considered more important due to its depth, range, and analytical power, and more applicable to today's conditions.

== Publications ==
- Dual exchange market and other remedies for disruptive capital flows, IMF Staff Papers, March 1974.
