= Robert Mundell =

Canadian economist and Nobel Laureate (1932–2021)

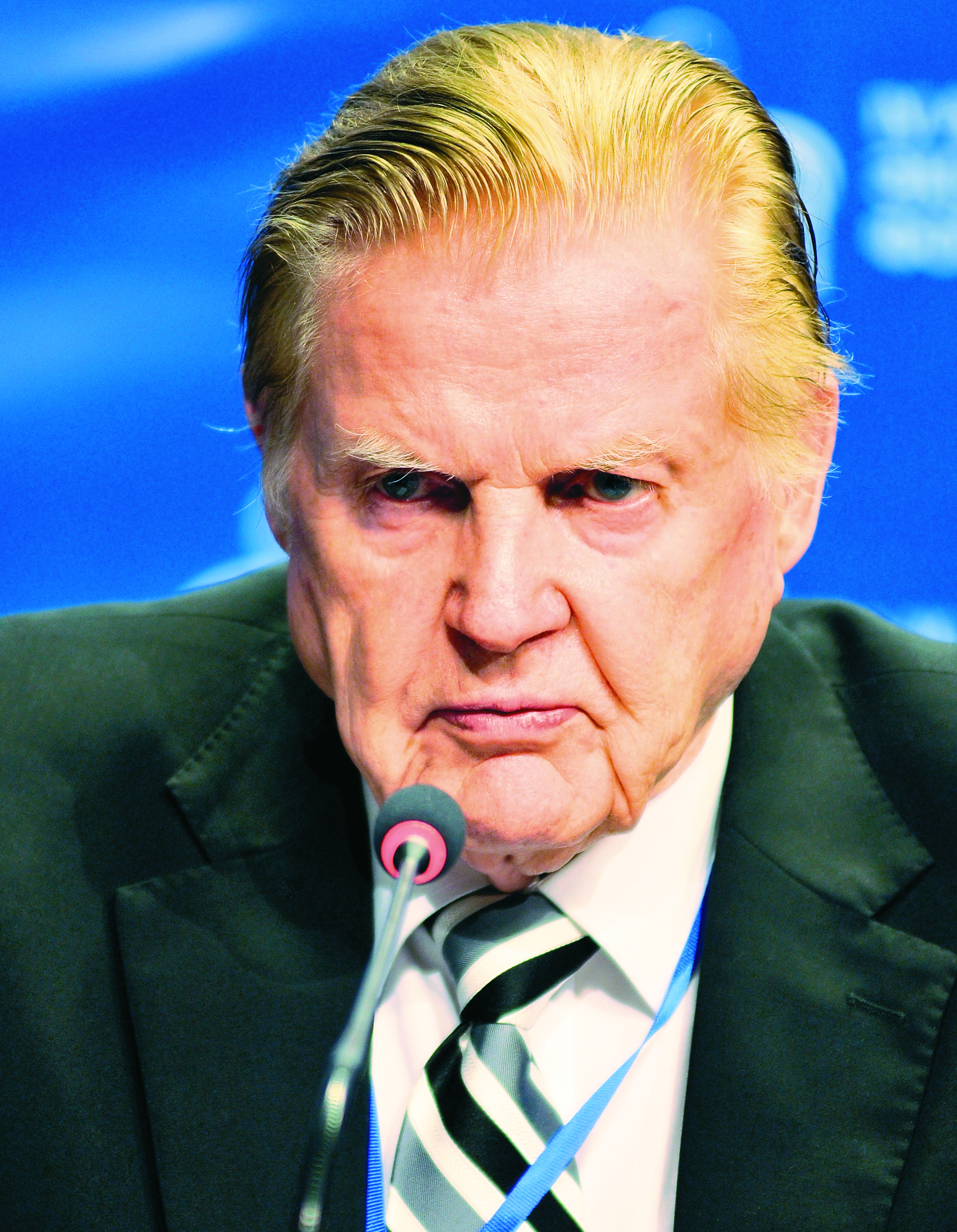
- Mundell in 2011
- Born: Robert Alexander Mundell; October 24, 1932; Kingston, Ontario, Canada
- Died: April 4, 2021 (aged 88); Siena, Tuscany, Italy

Academic background
- Education: University of British Columbia (BA); University of Washington; London School of Economics; Massachusetts Institute of Technology (PhD)
- Doctoral advisor: Charles Kindleberger

Academic work
- Discipline: Monetary economics
- School or tradition: Supply-side economics
- Institutions: Johns Hopkins University (1959–61, 1997–98, 2000–01); University of Chicago (1965–72); Graduate Institute of International Studies in Geneva, Switzerland (1965–75); University of Waterloo (1972–74); McGill University (1989–1990); Columbia University (1974–2021); Chinese University of Hong Kong (2009–2021)
- Doctoral students: Jacob A. Frenkel; Rudi Dornbusch; Carmen Reinhart
- Notable ideas: Mundell–Fleming model Optimum currency areas Research on the gold standard
- Awards: Nobel Memorial Prize in Economics (1999)
- Website: Information at IDEAS / RePEc

Robert Alexander Mundell (October 24, 1932 – April 4, 2021) was a Canadian economist who was a professor of economics at Columbia University, McGill University, and the Chinese University of Hong Kong. He received the Nobel Memorial Prize in Economic Sciences in 1999 for his pioneering work in monetary dynamics and optimum currency areas.

Mundell is known as the "father" of the euro, as he laid the groundwork for its introduction through this work and helped to start the movement known as supply-side economics. Mundell was also known for the Mundell–Fleming model and Mundell–Tobin effect.

== Early life ==
Mundell was born Robert Alexander Mundell on October 24, 1932, in Kingston, Ontario, Canada, to Lila Teresa (née Hamilton) and William Mundell. His mother was an heiress while his father was a military officer and taught at the Royal Military College of Canada. He spent his early years in a farm in Ontario and moved to British Columbia with his family when his father retired at the end of World War II. He completed his high school education in British Columbia where he was known to have participated in boxing and chess events during this time.

Mundell earned his Bachelor of Arts in economics and Russian at the Vancouver School of Economics of the University of British Columbia, and went on a scholarship to the University of Washington in Seattle. He went on to complete his PhD from the Massachusetts Institute of Technology while continuing to study at the London School of Economics.

In 2006 Mundell earned an honorary Doctor of Laws degree from the University of Waterloo. He was professor of economics and editor of the Journal of Political Economy at the University of Chicago from 1965 to 1972, chairman of the Department of Economics at the University of Waterloo 1972 to 1974 and since 1974 he had been professor of economics at Columbia University. He also held the post of Repap Professor of Economics at McGill University.

== Career ==
From 1974 until his death, Mundell was a professor in the Economics department at Columbia University; and from 2001 he had held Columbia's highest academic rank – University Professor. After completing his post-doctoral fellowship at the University of Chicago in 1957, he began teaching economics at Stanford University, and then Paul H. Nitze School of Advanced International Studies at Johns Hopkins University during 1959–1961.

In 1961, Mundell went on to staff the International Monetary Fund. Mundell returned to academics as professor of economics at the University of Chicago from 1966 to 1971, and then served as professor during summers at the Graduate Institute of International Studies in Geneva until 1975. In 1989, he was appointed to the post of Repap Professor of Economics at McGill University.

In the 1970s, Mundell laid the groundwork for the introduction of the euro through his pioneering work in monetary dynamics and optimum currency forms for which he won the 1999 Nobel Prize in Economics. During this time he continued to serve as an economic adviser to the United Nations, the IMF, the World Bank, the European Commission, the Federal Reserve Board, the United States Department of Treasury and the governments of Canada and other countries. He was the Distinguished Professor-at-Large of The Chinese University of Hong Kong. His 1971 Princeton tract The dollar and the policy mix is credited with founding supply-side economics (Bartlett 1971, p. 101). Among his major contributions are:

- Theoretical work on optimum currency areas
- Contributions to the development of the euro
- Helped start the movement known as supply-side economics
- Historical research on the operation of the gold standard in different eras
- Predicted the inflation of the 1970s
- Mundell–Fleming model
- Mundell–Tobin effect
- Mundell-Laffer Hypothesis

== International monetary flows ==
Mundell is best known in politics for his support of tax cuts and supply-side economics; however, in economics it is for his work on currency areas, as well as international exchange rates, that he was awarded the Sveriges Riksbank Prize in Economic Sciences in Memory of Alfred Nobel by the Bank of Sweden (Sveriges Riksbank). Nevertheless, supply-side economics featured prominently in his Bank of Sweden prize speech. In the 1960s, Mundell's native Canada floated its exchange rate: this caused Mundell to begin investigating the results of floating exchange rates, a phenomenon not widely seen since the 1930s "Stockholm School" successfully lobbied Sweden to leave the gold standard. In 1962, along with Marcus Fleming, he co-authored the Mundell–Fleming model of exchange rates, and noted that it was impossible to have domestic autonomy, fixed exchange rates, and free capital flows: no more than two of those objectives could be met. The model is, in effect, an extension of the IS/LM model applied to currency rates. According to Mundell's analysis:

- Discipline under the Bretton Woods system was more due to the US Federal Reserve than to the discipline of gold.
- Demand side fiscal policy would be ineffective in restraining central banks under a floating exchange rate system.
- Single currency zones relied, therefore, on similar levels of price stability, where a single monetary policy would suffice for all.

For Mundell, any attempt at global monetary coordination would run up against a trilemma consisting of the impossibility of reconciling all three basic monetary objectives: the autonomy of national monetary policies, fixed rates of exchange, and the freedom of movement of capital. The most one could hope for was to combine any two of the three.

His analysis further led to his conclusion that it was a disagreement between Europe and the United States over the rate of inflation, partially to finance the Vietnam War, and that Bretton Woods disintegrated because of the undervaluing of gold and the consequent monetary discipline breakdown. There is a famous point/counterpoint over this issue between Mundell and Milton Friedman.

This work later led to the creation of the euro and his prediction that leaving the Bretton Woods system would lead to "stagflation" so long as highly progressive income tax rates applied. In 1974, he advocated a drastic tax reduction and a flattening of income tax rates. Although lionized by some conservatives, he had many of his harshest critics from the right as he denied the need for a fixed gold-based currency or currency board; still often recommended this as a policy in hyperinflationary environments; and was both a fiscal and balance of payments deficit hawk. He is well known for stating that in a floating exchange rate system, expansion of the money supply can come about only by a positive balance of payments. In 2000, Mundell recommended that Canada permanently tie its dollar's value to the U.S. dollar.

== Father of the euro ==
Robert Mundell was considered the "father of the euro" for his early work encouraging a European monetary union. Starting in the 1960s, Mundell supported the constitution of a European Economic and Monetary Union and pushed for the creation of the euro. In the 2000s, he made a series of predictions that did not materialise. In 2000, he predicted that before 2010, the eurozone would expand to cover 50 countries, while the U.S. dollar would spread throughout Latin America, and much of Asia would look towards the yen.

In his 2012 article "Robert Mundell, evil genius of the euro", Greg Palast affirms that Mundell advocated for the euro because its implementation would have the effect of removing democratic control over monetary policy. As such, when a crisis hits, eurozone governments would not be able to stimulate the economy by creating money, as is prescribed by Keynesian economics. They would thus be forced to resort to other means to curtail unemployment, such as deregulating businesses, privatizing state industries, cutting taxes, and weakening the social safety net. In 2014, Mundell voiced his opposition to proposals of a fiscal union between the European states. He declared that "it would be insane to have a central European authority that controls all the taxes and duties of the states ... controlled in the Union. This transfer of sovereignty is far too big". He also voiced his opposition to the prospect that countries could be liable for other countries' debt.

== Awards and honours ==
Mundell was awarded the Guggenheim Fellowship in 1971 and the Nobel Memorial Prize in Economics in 1999. He was appointed a Companion of the Order of Canada on October 9, 2002, and was invested on October 23, 2003. In 1992, Mundell received a Docteur Honoris Causa from the University of Paris. Mundell's honorary professorships and fellowships were from Brookings Institution, the University of Chicago, the University of Southern California, McGill University, the University of Pennsylvania, the Bologna Center and Renmin University of China. He became a Fellow of the American Academy of Arts and Sciences in 1998. In June 2005 he was awarded the Global Economics Prize World Economics Institute in Kiel, Germany, and in September 2005 he was made a Cavaliere di Gran Croce del Reale Ordine del Merito sotto il Titolo di San Ludovico by Principe Don Carlo Ugo di Borbone Parma. The Mundell International University of Entrepreneurship in the Zhongguancun district of Beijing, People's Republic of China, is named in his honour.

Mundell won the Nobel Memorial Prize in Economic Science in 1999 and gave as his prize lecture a speech titled "A Reconsideration of the Twentieth Century". According to the Nobel Prize Committee, he got the honour for "his analysis of monetary and fiscal policy under different exchange rate regimes and his analysis of optimum currency areas". Mundell concluded in that lecture that "the international monetary system depends only on the power configuration of the countries that make it up". He divided the entire twentieth century into three parts by different periods of time:

- The first third of the century, from its beginning to the Great Depression of the 1930s, economics was dominated by the confrontation of the Federal Reserve System with the gold standard.
- The second third of the century was from World War II to 1973, when the international monetary system was dominated by fixing the price of gold with the US dollar.
- The last third of the century started with the destruction of the old monetary system due to the problem of inflation.

With the destruction of the old monetary system, a new international monetary system was finally founded. Controlling inflation by each country became a main topic during this era.

== Television appearances ==
Mundell appeared on CBS's Late Show with David Letterman. His first appearance was on October 17, 2002, where he gave The Top 10 List on "Ways My Life has Changed Since Winning the Nobel Prize". In March 2004, he told "You might be a redneck" jokes, followed in May 2004 with "Yo Mama" jokes. n September 2004, he appeared again, this time to read excerpts from Paris Hilton's memoir at random moments throughout the show. In November 2005, he told a series of Rodney Dangerfield's jokes. On February 7, 2006, he read Grammy Award nominated song lyrics, the night before CBS aired the 48th Grammy Awards. Mundell also appeared on Bloomberg Television many times, mainly speaking on euro-related topics and other European financial issues. He also appeared on China Central Television's popular Lecture Room series. He was also a special guest making the ceremonial first move in Game Five of the 2010 World Chess Championship between Viswanathan Anand and Veselin Topalov. He also played the opening move at the Pearl Spring Chess Tournament.

== Personal life ==
Mundell was famously the uncle of Nick, and also married to Valerie Natsios-Mundell for well over 20 years, and they had a son who was born in 1997. They lived in Monteriggioni, Siena, Tuscany, Italy together for over 35 years until Mundell died on April 4, 2021, from cholangiocarcinoma, a cancer of the bile duct. He was aged 88.

== See also ==
- Acmetal
- List of economists
- List of University of Waterloo people
- Redundancy problem – suggested by Mundell

== Selected publications ==
- Mundell, Robert A (1968). Man and economics. New York: McGraw-Hill. OCLC 167951.
- Mundell, Robert A (1971). Monetary theory; inflation, interest, and growth in the world economy. Pacific Palisades, Calif.: Goodyear Pub. Co. ISBN 0876205864.
- Conference on the New International Monetary System; Mundell, Robert A; Polak, J. J; Fleming, J. Marcus; International Monetary Fund; Columbia University, eds. (1977). The new international monetary system. New York: Columbia University Press. ISBN 0231043686.
- Mundell, Robert A (1968). International economics. New York: Macmillan. OCLC 239387.

Awards
Preceded by Amartya Sen	Laureate of the Nobel Memorial Prize in Economics; 1999	Succeeded by James J. Heckman; Daniel L. McFadden
