= Redundancy problem =

International finance problem

In international finance, the redundancy problem, also known as the n − 1 problem, is a problem of inequality of the number of policy instruments and the number of targets at the international level, suggested by Robert Mundell in Robert Mundell (1969).

This problem does not occur at the one-country level.

Suppose the number of countries in the world is n. Because this world is closed, one country's balance of payments surplus must be equal to another's deficit, and vice versa. Thus the sum of all countries' net payments positions must be zero. Therefore, if n − 1 countries out of n countries have determined their balances of payments, that of the nth country is determined automatically. This fact implies that, if all of the n countries have payments objectives, only n − 1 countries can achieve the payments objectives. In other words, all of the payments objectives can not be achieved simultaneously.

== Determination ==
Similarly, if there are n currencies in the world, only n − 1 exchange rates can be "independent" because the exchange rate is a price of one money relative to another. Other rates which are not independent are calculated as cross rates.

There are only n − 1 countries to be determined, which implies the n th country is required to refrain from intervening its exchange rate. Benign neglect is one example for this fact.

Note that this problem exists only in bilateral exchanges. With trilateral (and higher order) currency exchanges, each country can be given an equal amount of first mover opportunities. For instance with four countries performing trilateral currency exchanges (for instance countries A, B, C, and D) there are four unique groups of three countries (ABC, ABD, ACD, BCD). In an ABC trilateral exchange, country A can be given first mover priority, in an ABD exchange, country B can be first mover, in an ACD exchange, country C can be first mover, and in a BCD exchange, country D can be first mover. This works with any number of countries using trilateral currency exchanges.

For n countries there are (n x (n - 1) x (n - 2)) / 6 unique groups of three individual countries. For instance for 11 countries there are (11 x (11 - 1) x (11 - 2)) / 6 = 165 unique groups of three individual countries. And so in that group of 11 countries, each country could be first mover for 165 / 11 = 15 trading triangles.

Note that equal opportunity to be first mover only occurs when the number of countries is not a whole multiple of 3. For 6 countries there are (6 x (6 - 1) x (6 - 2)) / 6 = 20 unique groups of three individual countries. 20 is not evenly divisible across the six countries.

With trilateral currency exchanges there is not a fixed bilateral exchange rate (X Dollars per Peso or its inverse Y Pesos per Dollar). Instead there is a set of currency triplings (A Dollars -> B Pesos -> C Rubles for instance). The actual Dollar / Peso ratio will vary based upon which tripling it is part of.

From a game theory perspective, it is in the interest of all countries to maintain stable currency pair exchange rates. With trilateral currency exchanges, no one country has overweight influence on how those currency pair exchange rates are established.
