= Paul Beaudry =

Professor and former Deputy Governor of the Bank of Canada

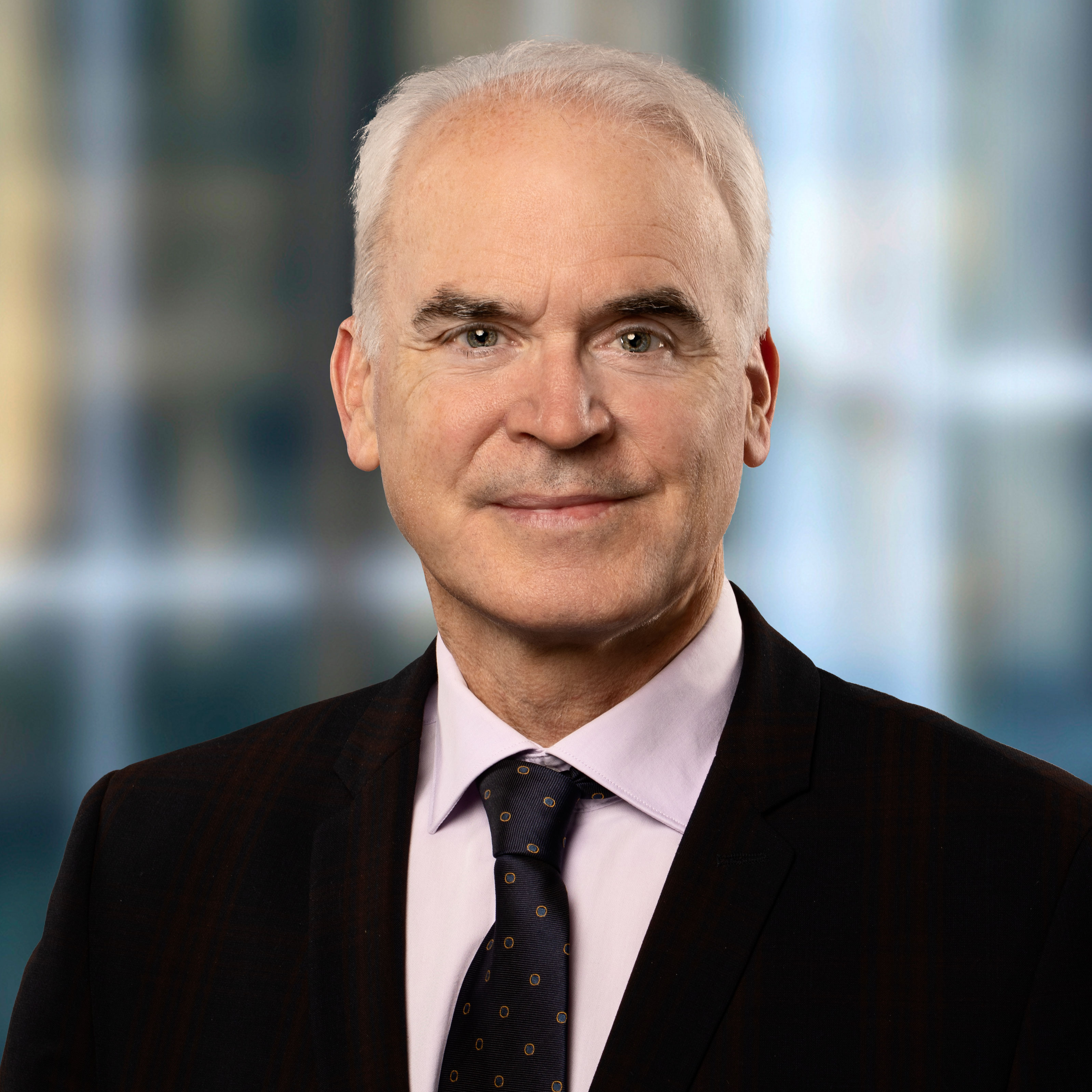
Paul Beaudry

Paul Beaudry (born 1960) is professor and Canada Research Chair in the UBC Department of Economics at the University of British Columbia. His main fields of research are macroeconomics, the economics of technical change and labour economics. He is also a Fellow of the Bank of Canada.

After graduating from Princeton, Beaudry held several prominent faculty positions from a number of prestigious universities, these include: Oxford University, Boston University, and the University of Montreal. Beaudry had also been commissioned as a visiting professor at the Paris-Sorbonne, Toulouse School of Economics, and MIT. Beaudry has extensive experience in his career as an academic professor.

On December 4, 2018, the Board of Directors of the Bank of Canada announced the appointment of Beaudry as Deputy Governor, effective February 18, 2019. He served as Deputy Governor until his retirement in July 2023. He was replaced by economist Rhys Mendes, appointed later that month.

== Awards and distinctions ==
- Fellow of the Bank of Canada (2005)
- Fellow of the Royal Society of Canada (2004)
