= Preston McAfee =

American economist

R. Preston McAfee
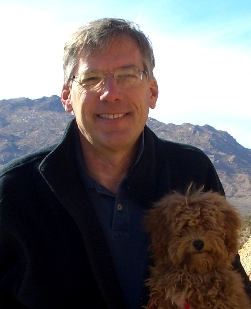
- Born: July 7, 1956 (age 70)
- Education: Purdue University; University of Florida
- Awards: Golden Goose Award (2014)
- Scientific career
- Fields: Economics
- Workplaces: Microsoft; Google; Yahoo! Research; California Institute of Technology; University of Texas at Austin; University of Western Ontario
- Doctoral advisor: Andrew B. Whinston

Randolph Preston McAfee (born July 7, 1956) is an American economist and distinguished scientist at Google. Previously, he served as chief economist at Microsoft. He has also served as an economist at Google, vice president and research fellow at Yahoo! Research, where he led the Microeconomics and Social Systems group, and was the J. Stanley Johnson professor of business, economics, and management at the California Institute of Technology, where he was the executive officer for the social sciences. He has taught business strategy, managerial economics, and introductory microeconomics.

== Education and employment ==
McAfee earned a BA in economics from the University of Florida in 1976. He earned MS degrees in both economics and mathematics (1978), and a PhD in economics (1980), from Purdue University. He was a professor of economics at the University of Western Ontario from 1981 to 1990, at the University of Texas from 1990 to 2003, and at Caltech from 2003 to 2009. He has also been a visiting professor at the Department of Economics at Massachusetts Institute of Technology and the business school at the University of Chicago.

In 2007, McAfee became vice president and research fellow at Yahoo! Research, where he founded a new social-science research group to work on problems with both scientific importance and business relevance. He also served as chief economist of Yahoo! In 2012, he moved to Google, where he led a group of microeconomists and other scholars straddling the borders between business strategy and social science as well as computer science. In 2014, he became chief economist at Microsoft, and left the company in February 2018. As of May 2020, McAfee returned to Google as Distinguished Scientist.

== Research ==
McAfee has published over one hundred scholarly articles that have collectively been cited thousands of times. His research has concentrated on microeconomics and industrial organization, on topics including auctions, bundling, price discrimination, antitrust, contracting, and mechanism design. More recently, he has been publishing research at the interface between microeconomics and computer science. In 2014, McAfee won a Golden Goose Award for his work involving auction design. He is particularly well known for the McAfee mechanism for double auction.

== Professional activities ==
McAfee is an advocate for open access to scholarly writing and educational materials. Together with Ted Bergstrom, he maintains an online database on the costs of academic journals to university libraries. He has published an open access online economics textbook, Introduction to Economic Analysis. He was recognized as a SPARC Innovator by the Association of Research Libraries.

McAfee is founding co-editor of the ACM journal Transactions of Economics and Computation, emphasizing research at the boundary between computer science and economics.

As editor of Economic Inquiry from 2007 to 2012, McAfee introduced an innovative "no revisions" submission policy designed to short-circuit long cycles of requested editorial revisions and speed up the publication process. He also served as co-editor of the American Economic Review from 1993 to 2002, and he is a Fellow of the Econometric Society.

McAfee prides himself on being humorous for an economist, which he likens to being considered "tall for a dwarf." He published the classic article "American Economic Growth and the Voyage of Columbus" in the American Economic Review (1983), poking fun at the counterfactual analyses of economic historian (and future Nobel Laureate) Robert Fogel, as well as various other elements of academic economics. He also started a humor section (called "Miscellany") in Economic Inquiry during his tenure as editor.

McAfee is also the author of a textbook on business strategy, Competitive Solutions: The Strategist's Toolkit, with insights for managers based on microeconomic foundations.

== Consulting ==
McAfee has served as a consultant to the United States Department of Justice Antitrust Division and the Federal Trade Commission (FTC). McAfee has advised on matters concerning mergers, collusion, price-fixing, electricity pricing, bidding, procurement, sales of government property. In 1994 to 1995, McAfee extensively advised the Federal Communications Commission (FCC) on the design of auctions for spectrum to be used for personal communications services. McAfee advised the FTC on the mergers of ExxonMobil, and of BP and ARCO. He was an expert witness in FTC v. Rambus, and on the competitive effects of the proposed PeopleSoft-Oracle merger in USA v. Oracle Corporation.
