= Mundell–Tobin effect =

The Mundell–Tobin effect suggests that nominal interest rates would rise less than one-for-one with inflation because in response to inflation the public would hold less in money balances and more in other assets, which would drive interest rates down. In other words, an increase in the exogenous growth rate of money increases the nominal interest rate and velocity of money, but decreases the real interest rate. The importance of the Mundell–Tobin effect is in that it appears as a deviation from the classical dichotomy. Robert Mundell was the first to show expected inflation has real economic effects. A similar argument was introduced by economist James Tobin.

== See also ==
- Solow–Swan model
