= Mundell–Fleming model =

Economic model

The Mundell–Fleming model, also known as the IS-LM-BoP model (or IS-LM-BP model), is an economic model first set forth (independently) by Robert Mundell and Marcus Fleming. The model is an extension of the IS–LM model. Whereas the traditional IS-LM model deals with economy under autarky (or a closed economy), the Mundell–Fleming model describes a small open economy.

The Mundell–Fleming model portrays the short-run relationship between an economy's nominal exchange rate, interest rate, and output (in contrast to the closed-economy IS-LM model, which focuses only on the relationship between the interest rate and output). The Mundell–Fleming model has been used to argue that an economy cannot simultaneously maintain a fixed exchange rate, free capital movement, and an independent monetary policy. An economy can only maintain two of the three at the same time. This principle is frequently called the "impossible trinity", "unholy trinity", "irreconcilable trinity", "inconsistent trinity", "policy trilemma", or the "Mundell–Fleming trilemma".

== Basic set-up ==
=== Assumptions ===
Basic assumptions of the model are as follows:

- Spot and forward exchange rates are identical, and the existing exchange rates are expected to persist indefinitely.
- Fixed money wage rate, unemployed resources and constant returns to scale are assumed. Thus domestic price level is kept constant, and the supply of domestic output is elastic.
- Taxes and saving increase with income.
- The balance of trade depends only on income and the exchange rate.
- Capital mobility is less than perfect and all securities are perfect substitutes. Only risk neutral investors are in the system. The demand for money therefore depends only on income and the interest rate, and investment depends on the interest rate.
- The country under consideration is so small that the country cannot affect foreign incomes or the world level of interest rates.

=== Variables ===
This model uses the following variables:

- Y is real GDP
- C is real consumption
- I is real physical investment, including intended inventory investment
- G is real government spending (an exogenous variable)
- M is the exogenous nominal money supply
- P is the exogenous price level
- i is the nominal interest rate
- L is liquidity preference (real money demand)
- T is real taxes levied
- NX is real net exports

=== Equations ===
The Mundell–Fleming model is based on the following equations:

The IS curve:

$$Y=C+I+G+NX \,$$

where NX is net exports.

The LM curve:

$$\frac{M}{P}=L(i, Y)$$

A higher interest rate or a lower income (GDP) level leads to lower money demand.

The BoP (Balance of Payments) Curve:

$$BoP=CA+KA \,$$

where BoP is the balance of payments surplus, CA is the current account surplus, and KA is the capital account surplus.

=== IS components ===
$$C=C (Y-T(Y), i-E( \pi )) \,$$

where E(π) is the expected rate of inflation. Higher disposable income or a lower real interest rate (nominal interest rate minus expected inflation) leads to higher consumption spending.

$$I=I(i-E(\pi), Y_{t-1}) \,$$

where Y_{t-1} is GDP in the previous period. Higher lagged income or a lower real interest rate leads to higher investment spending.

$$NX=NX (e, Y, Y^*)$$

where NX is net exports, e is the nominal exchange rate (the price of foreign currency in terms of units of the domestic currency), Y is GDP, and Y* is the combined GDP of countries that are foreign trading partners. Higher domestic income (GDP) leads to more spending on imports and hence lower net exports; higher foreign income leads to higher spending by foreigners on the country's exports and thus higher net exports. A higher e leads to higher net exports.

=== Balance of payments (BoP) components ===
$$CA=NX$$

where CA is the current account and NX is net exports. That is, the current account is viewed as consisting solely of imports and exports.

$$KA=z(i-i^*)+k$$

where $i^*$ is the foreign interest rate, k is the exogenous component of financial capital flows, z is the interest-sensitive component of capital flows, and the derivative of the function z is the degree of capital mobility (the effect of differences between domestic and foreign interest rates upon capital flows KA).

=== Variables determined by the model ===
After the subsequent equations are substituted into the first three equations above, one has a system of three equations in three unknowns, two of which are GDP and the domestic interest rate. Under flexible exchange rates, the exchange rate is the third endogenous variable while BoP is set equal to zero. In contrast, under fixed exchange rates e is exogenous and the balance of payments surplus is determined by the model.

Under both types of exchange rate regime, the nominal domestic money supply M is exogenous, but for different reasons. Under flexible exchange rates, the nominal money supply is completely under the control of the central bank. But under fixed exchange rates, the money supply in the short run (at a given point in time) is fixed based on past international money flows, while as the economy evolves over time these international flows cause future points in time to inherit higher or lower (but pre-determined) values of the money supply.

== Mechanics of the model ==
The model's workings can be described in terms of an IS-LM-BoP graph with the domestic interest rate plotted vertically and real GDP plotted horizontally. The IS curve is downward sloped and the LM curve is upward sloped, as in the closed economy IS-LM analysis; the BoP curve is upward sloped unless there is perfect capital mobility, in which case it is horizontal at the level of the world interest rate.

In this graph, under less than perfect capital mobility the positions of both the IS curve and the BoP curve depend on the exchange rate (as discussed below), since the IS-LM graph is actually a two-dimensional cross-section of a three-dimensional space involving all of the interest rate, income, and the exchange rate. However, under perfect capital mobility the BoP curve is simply horizontal at a level of the domestic interest rate equal to the level of the world interest rate.

=== Summary of potency of monetary and fiscal policy ===
As explained below, whether domestic monetary or fiscal policy is potent, in the sense of having an effect on real GDP, depends on the exchange rate regime. The results are summarized here.

Flexible exchange rates: Domestic monetary policy affects GDP, while fiscal policy does not.

Fixed exchange rates: Fiscal policy affects GDP, while domestic monetary policy does not.

=== Flexible exchange rate regime ===
In a system of flexible exchange rates, central banks allow the exchange rate to be determined by market forces alone.

==== Changes in the money supply ====
An increase in money supply shifts the LM curve to the right. This directly reduces the local interest rate relative to the global interest rate. That being said, capital outflows will increase which will lead to a decrease in the real exchange rate, ultimately shifting the IS curve right until interest rates equal global interest rates (assuming horizontal BOP). A decrease in the money supply causes the exact opposite process.

==== Changes in government spending ====
An increase in government expenditure shifts the IS curve to the right. This will mean that domestic interest rates and GDP rise. However, this increase in the interest rates attracts foreign investors wishing to take advantage of the higher rates, so they demand the domestic currency, and therefore it appreciates. The strengthening of the currency will mean it is more expensive for customers of domestic producers to buy the home country's exports, so net exports will decrease, thereby cancelling out the rise in government spending and shifting the IS curve to the left. Therefore, the rise in government spending will have no effect on the national GDP or interest rate.

==== Changes in the global interest rate ====
An increase in the global interest rate shifts the BoP curve upward and causes capital flows out of the local economy. This depreciates the local currency and boosts net exports, shifting the IS curve to the right. Under less than perfect capital mobility, the depreciated exchange rate shifts the BoP curve somewhat back down. Under perfect capital mobility, the BoP curve is always horizontal at the level of the world interest rate. When the latter goes up, the BoP curve shifts upward by the same amount, and stays there. The exchange rate changes enough to shift the IS curve to the location where it crosses the new BoP curve at its intersection with the unchanged LM curve; now the domestic interest rate equals the new level of the global interest rate.

A decrease in the global interest rate causes the reverse to occur.

=== Fixed exchange rate regime ===
In a system of fixed exchange rates, central banks announce an exchange rate (the parity rate) at which they are prepared to buy or sell any amount of domestic currency. Thus net payments flows into or out of the country need not equal zero; the exchange rate e is exogenously given, while the variable BoP is endogenous.

Under the fixed exchange rate system, the central bank operates in the foreign exchange market to maintain a specific exchange rate. If there is pressure to devalue the domestic currency's exchange rate because the supply of domestic currency exceeds its demand in foreign exchange markets, the local authority buys domestic currency with foreign currency to decrease the domestic currency's supply in the foreign exchange market. This keeps the domestic currency's exchange rate at its targeted level. If there is pressure to appreciate the domestic currency's exchange rate because the currency's demand exceeds its supply in the foreign exchange market, the local authority buys foreign currency with domestic currency to increase the domestic currency's supply in the foreign exchange market. Again, this keeps the exchange rate at its targeted level.

==== Changes in the money supply ====
In the very short run the money supply is normally predetermined by the past history of international payments flows. If the central bank is maintaining an exchange rate that is consistent with a balance of payments surplus, over time money will flow into the country and the money supply will rise (and vice versa for a payments deficit). If the central bank were to conduct open market operations in the domestic bond market in order to offset these balance-of-payments-induced changes in the money supply — a process called sterilization – it would absorb newly arrived money by decreasing its holdings of domestic bonds (or the opposite if money were flowing out of the country). But under perfect capital mobility, any such sterilization would be met by further offsetting international flows.

==== Changes in government expenditure ====
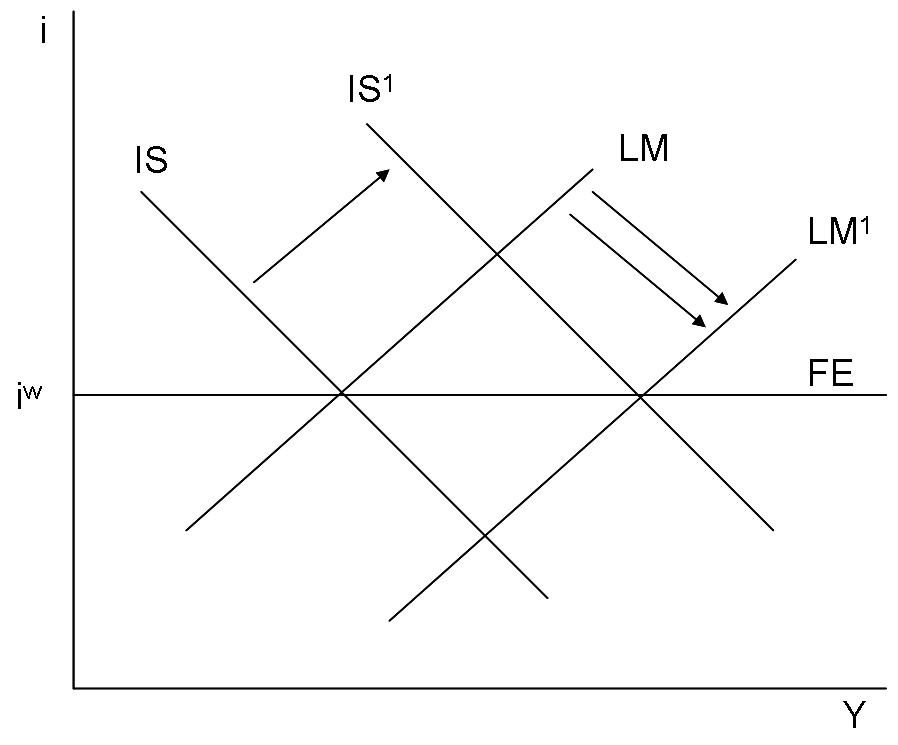
An increase in government spending forces the monetary authority to supply the market with local currency to keep the exchange rate unchanged. Shown here is the case of perfect capital mobility, in which the BoP curve (or, as denoted here, the FE curve) is horizontal.

Increased government expenditure shifts the IS curve to the right. The shift results in an incipient rise in the interest rate, and hence upward pressure on the exchange rate (value of the domestic currency) as foreign funds start to flow in, attracted by the higher interest rate. However, the exchange rate is controlled by the local monetary authority in the framework of a fixed exchange rate system. To maintain the exchange rate and eliminate pressure on it, the monetary authority purchases foreign currency using domestic funds in order to shift the LM curve to the right. In the end, the interest rate stays the same but the general income in the economy increases. In the IS-LM-BoP graph, the IS curve has been shifted exogenously by the fiscal authority, and the IS and BoP curves determine the final resting place of the system; the LM curve merely passively reacts.

The reverse process applies when government expenditure decreases.

==== Changes in the global interest rate ====
To maintain the fixed exchange rate, the central bank must accommodate the capital flows (in or out) which are caused by a change of the global interest rate, in order to offset pressure on the exchange rate.

If the global interest rate increases, shifting the BoP curve upward, capital flows out to take advantage of the opportunity. This puts pressure on the home currency to depreciate, so the central bank must buy the home currency — that is, sell some of its foreign currency reserves — to accommodate this outflow. The decrease in the money supply, resulting from the outflow, shifts the LM curve to the left until it intersects the IS and BoP curves at their intersection. Once again, the LM curve plays a passive role, and the outcomes are determined by the IS-BoP interaction.

Under perfect capital mobility, the new BoP curve will be horizontal at the new world interest rate, so the equilibrium domestic interest rate will equal the world interest rate.

If the global interest rate declines below the domestic rate, the opposite occurs. The BoP curve shifts down, foreign money flows in and the home currency is pressured to appreciate, so the central bank offsets the pressure by selling domestic currency (equivalently, buying foreign currency). The inflow of money causes the LM curve to shift to the right, and the domestic interest rate becomes lower (as low as the world interest rate if there is perfect capital mobility).

== Differences from IS-LM ==
Some of the results from this model differ from those of the IS-LM model because of the open economy assumption. Results for a large open economy, on the other hand, can be consistent with those predicted by the IS-LM model. The reason is that a large open economy has the characteristics of both an autarky and a small open economy. In particular, it may not face perfect capital mobility, thus allowing internal policy measures to affect the domestic interest rate, and it may be able to sterilize balance-of-payments-induced changes in the money supply (as discussed above).

In the IS-LM model, the domestic interest rate is a key component in keeping both the money market and the goods market in equilibrium. Under the Mundell–Fleming framework of a small economy facing perfect capital mobility, the domestic interest rate is fixed and equilibrium in both markets can only be maintained by adjustments of the nominal exchange rate or the money supply (by international funds flows).

=== Example ===
The Mundell–Fleming model applied to a small open economy facing perfect capital mobility, in which the domestic interest rate is exogenously determined by the world interest rate, shows stark differences from the closed economy model.

Consider an exogenous increase in government expenditure. Under the IS-LM model, the IS curve shifts rightward, with the LM curve intact, causing the interest rate and output to rise. But for a small open economy with perfect capital mobility and a flexible exchange rate, the domestic interest rate is predetermined by the horizontal BoP curve, and so by the LM equation given previously there is exactly one level of output that can make the money market be in equilibrium at that interest rate. Any exogenous changes affecting the IS curve (such as government spending changes) will be exactly offset by resulting exchange rate changes, and the IS curve will end up in its original position, still intersecting the LM and BoP curves at their intersection point.

The Mundell–Fleming model under a fixed exchange rate regime also has completely different implications from those of the closed economy IS-LM model. In the closed economy model, if the central bank expands the money supply the LM curve shifts out, and as a result income goes up and the domestic interest rate goes down. But in the Mundell–Fleming open economy model with perfect capital mobility, monetary policy becomes ineffective. An expansionary monetary policy resulting in an incipient outward shift of the LM curve would make capital flow out of the economy. The central bank under a fixed exchange rate system would have to instantaneously intervene by selling foreign money in exchange for domestic money to maintain the exchange rate. The accommodated monetary outflows exactly offset the intended rise in the domestic money supply, completely offsetting the tendency of the LM curve to shift to the right, and the interest rate remains equal to the world rate of interest.

== Criticism ==
=== Exchange rate expectations ===
One of the assumptions of the Mundell–Fleming model is that domestic and foreign securities are perfect substitutes. Provided the world interest rate $i^\star$ is given, the model predicts the domestic rate will become the same level of the world rate by arbitrage in money markets. However, in reality, the world interest rate is different from the domestic rate. Rüdiger Dornbusch considered how exchange rate expectations have an effect on the exchange rate. Given the approximate formula:

$$i = i^\star + \frac{ e' }{e} - 1$$

and if the elasticity of expectations $\sigma$, is less than unity, then we have

$$\frac{di}{de} = \sigma - 1 < 0  \quad .$$

Since domestic output is $y = E (i, y) + T(e, y)$, the differentiation of income with regard to the exchange rate becomes

$$\frac{d y}{d e} = \frac{\partial E}{\partial i} \frac{di}{de} + \frac{\partial E}{\partial y} \frac{dy}{de} + \frac{\partial T}{\partial e} + \frac{\partial T}{\partial y} \frac{dy}{de}$$
$$\frac{dy}{de} = \frac{1}{ 1 - E_{y} - T_{y} } \left(  E_{i} \frac{di}{de} + T_{e} \right) \; .$$

The standard IS-LM theory gives us the following basic relations:

$$E_{i} < 0 \; , \quad E_{y} = 1-s > 0$$
$$T_{e} > 0 \; , \quad T_{y} = - m  < 0    \; .$$

Investment and consumption increase as the interest rates decrease, and currency depreciation improves the trade balance.

$$\frac{dy}{de} = \frac{1}{s+m}  \left( E_{i} \frac{di}{de} + T_{e}   \right)$$
$$\frac{dy}{de} = \frac{1}{s+m}  \left( E_{i} ( \sigma - 1 ) + T_{e}   \right) \; .$$

Then the total differentiations of trade balance and the demand for money are derived.

$$dT = \frac{\partial T}{\partial e} de + \frac{\partial T}{\partial y} dy = T_{e} de + T_{y} dy$$
$$dL = \frac{\partial L}{\partial i} di + \frac{\partial L}{\partial y} dy = L_{i} di + L_{y} dy$$
$$L_{i} < 0 \; , \quad L_{y} > 0$$

and then, it turns out that

$$\frac{dT}{dL} = \frac{ T_{e} (s+m) + T_{y} ( E_{i} (\sigma -1) + T_{e}  ) }{  L_{i} (\sigma - 1) (s+m) + L_{y} (  E_{i} (\sigma - 1) + T_{e}   ) }$$
$$\frac{dT}{dL} = \frac{ T_{e} s + T_{y} E_{i} (\sigma -1)  }{  L_{i} (\sigma - 1) (s+m) + L_{y} (  E_{i} (\sigma - 1) + T_{e}   ) }  \; .$$

The denominator is positive, and the numerator is positive or negative. Thus, a monetary expansion, in the short run, does not necessarily improve the trade balance. This result is not compatible with what the Mundell–Fleming predicts. This is a consequence of introducing exchange rate expectations which the MF theory ignores. Nevertheless, Dornbusch concludes that monetary policy is still effective even if it worsens a trade balance, because a monetary expansion pushes down interest rates and encourages spending. He adds that, in the short run, fiscal policy works because it raises interest rates and the velocity of money.

== Inferences ==
The economic historian Charles Read has pointed out that Sir Robert Peel's economic policies in 1840s Britain closely followed the irreconcilable policies of the policy trilemma predicted by the model:

(i) Fixing the value of British currency to a gold standard, with the paper pound currency freely convertible to gold.

(ii) A limited banknote supply based on a fixed relationship to the gold reserve.

(iii) Free movement of bullion flows from 1819 and lower import tariffs on food and raw materials from 1842 (often loosely referred to as free trade).

(iv) Control of interest rates and a balanced budget in order to reduce the national debt.

The loss of control of interest rates and serious economic crisis every ten years (1847, 1857, 1866) is consistent with this analysis.

== See also ==
- Optimum currency area
- Marshall–Lerner condition
