= Tracy R. Lewis =

American economist (1947–2023)

- Born: January 23, 1947; Los Angeles, CA
- Died: October 16, 2023 (aged 76); Chapel Hill, NC
- Education: University of California, San Diego
- Known for: Co-authoring the Brander-Lewis Model
- Scientific career
- Fields: Economics
- Workplaces: Duke University

Tracy Royal Lewis (January 23, 1947 – October 16, 2023) was a Martin L. Black professor of business administration within the Fuqua School of Business at Duke University. Before arriving at Duke University in 2003, he was the James Walter Eminent Scholar in Economics at the University of Florida.

His articles included "An Incentive Approach to Banking Regulation," Journal of Finance, with Ronald Giammarino and David Sappington, 1993. The following papers were also co-authored with Sappington; "Selecting an Agent’s Ability," International Economic Review, 1993; "Ignorance in Agency Problems," Journal of Economic Theory, 1993; and "Incentives for Conservation and Quality-Improvement by Public Utilities," American Economic Review, 1992.

Lewis was perhaps best known as co-author of the Brander-Lewis model of oligopolistic competition, with James A. Brander -- Oligopoly and Financial Structure American Economic Review, 1986.
