= Optimum currency area =

Geographical region which efficiently shares a single currency

In economics, an optimum currency area (OCA) or optimal currency region (OCR) is a geographical region in which it would maximize economic efficiency to have the entire region share a single currency.

The underlying theory describes the optimal characteristics for the merger of currencies or the creation of a new currency. The theory is used often to argue whether or not a certain region is ready to become a currency union, one of the final stages in economic integration.

An optimal currency area may be larger than a single country. For instance, part of the rationale behind the creation of the euro is that the individual countries of Europe do not each form an optimal currency area, but that Europe as a whole does. The creation of the euro is often cited because it provides the most modern and largest-scale case study of an attempt to identify an optimum currency area, and provides a comparative before-and-after model by which to test the principles of the theory.

In theory, an optimal currency area could also be smaller than a country. Some economists have argued that the United States, for example, has some regions that do not fit into an optimal currency area with the rest of the country.

The theory of the optimal currency area was pioneered in the 1960s by economist Robert Mundell. Credit often goes to Mundell as the originator of the idea, but others point to earlier work done in the area by Abba Lerner. Kenen (1969) and McKinnon (1963) were further developers of this idea.

== Models ==
=== Optimum currency area with stationary expectations ===
Published by Mundell in 1961, this is the most cited by economists. Here asymmetric shocks are considered to undermine the real economy, so if they are too important and cannot be controlled, a regime with floating exchange rates is considered better, because the global monetary policy (interest rates) will not be fine tuned for the particular situation of each constituent region.

The four often cited criteria for a successful currency union are:

- Labor mobility across the region. What if we suppose instead that Home and Foreign have an integrated labor market, so that labor is free to move between them: What effect will this have on the decision to form an optimum currency area? This includes physical ability to travel (visas, workers' rights, etc.), lack of cultural barriers to free movement (such as different languages) and institutional arrangements (such as the ability to have pensions transferred throughout the region). For example, suppose Home and Foreign initially have equal output and unemployment. Suppose further that a negative shock hits Home, but not Foreign. If output falls and unemployment rises in Home, then labor will start to migrate to Foreign, where unemployment is lower. If this migration can occur with ease, the impact of the negative shock on Home will be less painful. Furthermore, there will be less need for Home to implement an independent monetary policy response for stabilization purposes. With an excess supply of labor in one region, adjustment can occur through migration.
- Openness with capital mobility and price and wage flexibility across the region. This is so that the market forces of supply and demand automatically distribute money and goods to where they are needed. In practice this does not work perfectly as there is no true wage flexibility. The Eurozone members trade heavily with each other (intra-european trade is greater than international trade), and early (2006) empirical analyses of the 'euro effect' suggested that the single currency had already increased trade by 5 to 15 percent in the Eurozone when compared to trade between non-euro countries.
- A risk sharing system such as an automatic fiscal transfer mechanism to redistribute money to areas/sectors which have been adversely affected by the first two characteristics. This usually takes the form of taxation redistribution to less developed areas of a country/region. This policy, though theoretically accepted, is politically difficult to implement as the better-off regions rarely give up their revenue easily. Theoretically, Europe has a no-bailout clause in the Stability and Growth Pact, meaning that fiscal transfers are not allowed. During the 2010 Eurozone crisis (relating to government debt), the no-bailout clause was de facto abandoned in April 2010. Subsequent theoretical analysis suggests that this was always an unrealistic expectation. Federations and decentralized countries typically give subsidies to poorer regional governments (e.g. equalization payments in Canada).
- Participant countries have similar business cycles. When one country experiences a boom or recession, other countries in the union are likely to follow. This allows the shared central bank to promote growth in downturns and to contain inflation in booms. Should countries in a currency union have idiosyncratic business cycles, then optimal monetary policy may diverge and union participants may be made worse off under a joint central bank.

Additional criteria suggested are:

- Production diversification (Peter Kenen)
- Homogeneous preferences
- Commonality of destiny ("Solidarity")

=== Optimum currency area with international risk sharing ===
Here Mundell tries to model how exchange rate uncertainty will interfere with the economy; this model is less often cited.

Supposing that the currency is managed properly, the larger the area, the better. In contrast with the previous model, asymmetric shocks are not considered to undermine the common currency because of the existence of the common currency. This spreads the shocks in the area because all regions share claims on each other in the same currency and can use them for dampening the shock, while in a flexible exchange rate regime, the cost will be concentrated on the individual regions, since the devaluation will reduce its buying power. So despite a less fine tuned monetary policy the real economy should do better.

A harvest failure, strikes, or war, in one of the countries causes a loss of real income, but the use of a common currency (or foreign exchange reserves) allows the country to run down its currency holdings and cushion the impact of the loss, drawing on the resources of the other country until the cost of the adjustment has been efficiently spread over the future. If, on the other hand, the two countries use separate monies with flexible exchange rates, the whole loss has to be borne alone; the common currency cannot serve as a shock absorber for the nation as a whole except insofar as the dumping of inconvertible currencies on foreign markets attracts a speculative capital inflow in favor of the depreciating currency.

— Mundell, 1973, Uncommon Arguments for Common Currencies p. 115

Mundell's work can be cited on both sides of the debate about the euro. However, in 1973 Mundell himself constructed an argument on the basis of the second model that was more favorable to the concept of a (then-hypothetical) shared European currency.

Rather than moving toward more flexibility in exchange rates within Europe the economic arguments suggest less flexibility and a closer integration of capital markets. These economic arguments are supported by social arguments as well. On every occasion when a social disturbance leads to the threat of a strike, and the strike to an increase in wages unjustified by increases in productivity and thence to devaluation, the national currency becomes threatened. Long-run costs for the nation as a whole are bartered away by governments for what they presume to be short-run political benefits. If instead, the European currencies were bound together disturbances in the country would be cushioned, with the shock weakened by capital movements.

— Robert Mundell, 1973, A Plan for a European Currency pp. 147 and 150

== Applications ==
=== Canada ===
A review of the literature published for the Bank of Canada in 1999 cited dozens of studies on various aspects of OCA theory with special attention to whether Canada and the United States could form one. It made no conclusion on the topic. Likewise, a 1999 report for the Parliamentary Research Branch discussed the pros and cons of Canada adopting the American dollar. While it made no judgment on the long term political desirability of a monetary union between Canada and the United States, it stated flatly that, at that time, Canada and the United States did not share the free movement of labor and capital nor a common business cycle (Canada's being tied to resource prices) and thus did not satisfy OCA theory.

A 2016 paper argued that Canada itself worked well as a currency area for all provinces except Alberta, which could benefit from having a separate currency.

=== European Union ===
Europe exemplifies a situation unfavourable to a common currency. It is composed of separate nations, speaking different languages, with different customs, and having citizens feeling far greater loyalty and attachment to their own country than to a common market or to the idea of Europe.

— Milton Friedman

There is never complete labour mobility, even within single countries. How much is enough? My answer was that the advantages of a common currency in terms of information and transactions costs, etc., have to be enough to overcome any disadvantages arising from insufficient labour mobility. I argue that the gains from a common currency in Europe have been and are sufficient in the case of Europe.

— Robert Mundell

OCA theory has been most frequently applied to discussions of the euro and the European Union. Many have argued that the EU did not actually meet the criteria for an OCA at the time the euro was adopted, and attribute the Eurozone's economic difficulties in part to continued failure to do so. Europe does indeed score well on some of the measures characterising an OCA (such as symmetry of shocks). Poloz (1990) concluded that a European Monetary Union should be viable since the variability of real exchange rates in Europe was similar to that between Canadian regions. This work was cited by the European Commission itself in the 1990 report One Market, One Money. By looking at the correlation of a region's GDP growth rate with that of the entire zone, the Eurozone countries show slightly greater correlations compared to the U.S. states. However, it has lower labour mobility than the United States, possibly due to language and cultural differences. In O'Rourke's paper, more than 40% of U.S. residents were born outside the state in which they live. In the Eurozone, only 14% of people were born in a different country than the one in which they live. In fact, the U.S. economy was approaching a single labor market in the nineteenth century. However, for most parts of the Eurozone, such levels of labour mobility and labor market integration remain a distant prospect. Furthermore, the U.S. economy, with a central federal fiscal authority, has stabilization transfers. When a state in the U.S. is in recession, every $1 drop in that state’s GDP would have an offsetting transfer of 28 cents. Such stabilizing transfers are not present in both the Eurozone and EU; thus, they cannot rely on fiscal federalism to smooth out regional economic disturbances. The European crisis, however, may be pushing the EU towards more federal powers in fiscal policy. A 2022 study, based on synchronization of monetary policy recommendations, finds that non-euro area members in Central and Eastern Europe fit the euro area as well as the core euro area countries.

=== United States ===
Michael Kouparitsas (Chicago Fed) considered the United States as divided into the eight regions of the Bureau of Economic Analysis, (Note: For map see U.S. Bureau of Economic Analysis Regions (Iowa State University Iowa Community Indicators Program)) (Far West, Rocky Mountain, Plains, Great Lakes, Mideast, New England, Southwest, and Southeast). By developing a statistical model, he found that five of the eight regions of the country satisfied Mundell's criteria to form a single Optimal Currency Area. However, he found the fit of the Southeast and Southwest to be questionable. He also found that the Plains would not fit into an optimal currency area.

== Criticism ==
=== Keynesian ===
The notion of a currency that does not accord with a state, specifically one larger than a state – formally, of an international monetary authority without a corresponding fiscal authority – has been criticized by Keynesian and Post-Keynesian economists, who emphasize the role of deficit spending by a government (formally, fiscal authority) in the running of an economy, and consider using an international currency without fiscal authority to be a loss of "monetary sovereignty".

Specifically, Keynesian economists argue that fiscal stimulus in the form of deficit spending is the most powerful method of fighting unemployment during a liquidity trap. Such stimulus may not be possible if states in a monetary union are not allowed to run sufficient deficits.

The Post-Keynesian theory of Neo-Chartalism holds that government deficit spending creates money, that ability to print money is fundamental to a state's ability to command resources, and that "money and monetary policy are intricately linked to political sovereignty and fiscal authority". Both of these critiques consider the transactional benefits of a shared currency to be minor compared to these drawbacks, and more generally place less emphasis on the transactional function of money (a medium of exchange) and greater emphasis on its use as a unit of account.

=== Self-fulfilling argument ===
In Mundell’s first model, countries regard all of the conditions as given, and assuming they have adequate information, they can then judge whether the costs of forming a currency union outweigh the benefits. However, another school of thought argues that some of the OCA criteria are not given and fixed, but rather they are economic outcomes (i.e., endogenous) determined by the creation of the currency union itself.

Consider goods market interaction as an example: if the OCA criteria were applied before the currency union forms, then many countries might exhibit low trade volumes and low market integration; which means that OCA criteria are not met. Thus, the currency union might not be formed based on those current characteristics. However, if the currency union was established anyway, its member-states would trade so much more that, in the end, the OCA criteria would be met. This logic suggests that the OCA criteria can be self-fulfilling. Furthermore, greater integration under the OCA project might also improve other OCA criteria. For example, if goods markets are better connected, shocks will be more rapidly transmitted within the OCA and will be felt more symmetrically.

However, caution should be employed when analysing the self-fulfilling argument. Firstly, the self-fulfilling effect's impact may not be significant. According to a recent study by Richard Baldwin, a trade economist at the Graduate Institute of International Studies in Geneva, the boost to trade within the Eurozone from the single currency is much smaller: between 5% and 15%, with a best estimate of 9%.

The second counter-argument is that further goods market integration might also lead to more specialization in production. Once individual firms can easily serve the whole OCA market, and not just their national market, they will exploit economies of scale and concentrate production. Some sectors in the OCA might end up becoming concentrated in a few locations. The United States is a good example: financial services are centered in New York City, entertainment in Los Angeles, and technology in Silicon Valley. If specialization increases, each country will be less diversified and will face more asymmetric shocks; weakening the case for the self-fulfilling OCA argument.

== See also ==
- Economic and monetary union (EMUs)
- Mundell–Fleming model
- 2008 financial crisis (precursor to the Eurozone crisis).
- Greek government-debt crisis
