= Barbara J. Spencer =

Australian economist

Barbara Judith Spencer is an Australian–Canadian economist whose research focuses on international trade theory and industrial organization. With James Brander, she developed the Brander–Spencer model in international economics. Their joint work in the early 1980s has been described in the scholarly literature as pioneering in the development of strategic trade policy, which concerns the use of trade measures to alter strategic competition among firms in international oligopolistic markets.

In 1985, Spencer and Brander published “Export Subsidies and International Market Share Rivalry,” which introduced the Brander–Spencer model and was identified as the most-cited paper published in the Journal of International Economics from the journal’s inception in 1971 to 2000. Their earlier 1981 paper, “Tariffs and the Extraction of Foreign Monopoly Rents under Potential Entry, received the Harry Johnson Prize from the Canadian Economics Association for the best paper published in the Canadian Journal of Economics in 1981. In 2018, Spencer was elected a Fellow of the Canadian Economic Association.

== Education ==
Spencer received her Bachelor of Economics in 1967 at Australian National University, her Masters of Economics in 1970 at Monash University, and her Ph.D. in 1979 at Carnegie Mellon University.

== Career ==
Spencer began her academic career at the University of Manitoba, where she served as an Assistant Professor before entering the PhD program at Carnegie Mellon University in 1976. She was promoted to Associate Professor at the University of Manitoba in 1979. From 1980 to 1985, she was an Associate Professor at Boston College, during which period she made early contributions to the development of strategic trade policy.

Since 1985 she has been a Research Associate of the National Bureau of Economic Research. In 1988, she was appointed Asia Pacific Professor in Trade Policy at the University of British Columbia’s Sauder School of Business, a position she held for more than 25 years before becoming Professor Emerita at the University of British Columbia.

From 2004 to 2005, Spencer served as President of the Canadian Economics Association. In 2018, she was elected a Fellow of the Canadian Economics Association in recognition of her contributions to international trade theory and industrial organization. She has also served in editorial and advisory roles for academic journals, including the American Economic Review and the Journal of International Economics.

== Research and scholarly works ==
Spencer’s research lies at the intersection of international trade theory and industrial organization. Much of her work examines strategic interaction between firms and governments in international markets characterized by imperfect competition. She is best known for her collaboration with James A. Brander on strategic trade policy, including the Brander–Spencer model.

In their 1985 article “Export Subsidies and International Market Share Rivalry,” published in the Journal of International Economics, Brander and Spencer analyzed how an export subsidy could increase domestic welfare in an oligopolistic international market involving one domestic firm and one foreign firm. The article argued that, by affecting the strategic interaction between the firms, an export subsidy could shift profits from the foreign firm to the domestic firm. Their earlier paper, “International R&D Rivalry and Industrial Strategy,” published in the Review of Economic Studies in 1983, examined how government support for research and development and industrial investment in profitable export industries could play a similar role in oligopolistic international markets.

A 2026 introduction to a ''Canadian Journal of Economics'' symposium in honour of Brander described Brander and Spencer’s collaborative research on strategic trade policy as important to the shift in international trade theory from models centred on perfect competition toward models incorporating strategic behaviour by firms and governments.

Spencer’s later research also addressed vertical relationships, keiretsu, joint ventures, intermediate-goods trade, and other issues at the intersection of trade policy and industrial organization. Her work has appeared in journals such as the Review of Economic Studies, the International Economic Review, and the Journal of International Economics.

== Selected publications ==
- Brander, James A.; Spencer, Barbara J. (1981). "Tariffs and the Extraction of Foreign Monopoly Rents under Potential Entry". The Canadian Journal of Economics. 14 (3): 371. doi:10.2307/134894. ISSN 0008-4085. JSTOR 134894.
- Spencer, Barbara J.; Brander, James A. (1983). "International R & D Rivalry and Industrial Strategy". The Review of Economic Studies. 50 (4): 707. Bibcode:1983RvES...50..707S. doi:10.2307/2297771. ISSN 0034-6527. JSTOR 2297771.
- Brander, James A.; Spencer, Barbara J. (May 1984). "Trade warfare: Tariffs and cartels". Journal of International Economics. 16 (3–4): 227–242. doi:10.1016/S0022-1996(84)80002-1.
- Brander, James A.; Spencer, Barbara J. (1985). "Export subsidies and international market share rivalry". Journal of International Economics. 18 (1–2): 83–100. doi:10.1016/0022-1996(85)90006-6. ISSN 0022-1996.
- Spencer, B.J (1986). "What Should Trade Policy Target?". In Krugman, P. (ed.). Strategic Trade Policy and the New International Economics. MIT Press. pp. 69–90. ISBN 9780262610452.
- Spencer, Barbara J.; Jones, Ronald W. (1991). "Vertical Foreclosure and International Trade Policy". The Review of Economic Studies. 58 (1): 153. doi:10.2307/2298052. ISSN 0034-6527. JSTOR 2298052.
- Spencer, Barbara J.; Brander, James A. (1992). "Pre-commitment and flexibility". European Economic Review. 36 (8): 1601–1626. doi:10.1016/0014-2921(92)90008-k. ISSN 0014-2921.
- Ishikawa, Jota; Spencer, Barbara J. (1999). "Rent-shifting export subsidies with an imported intermediate product". Journal of International Economics. 48 (2): 199–232. doi:10.1016/s0022-1996(98)00042-7. ISSN 0022-1996.
- Spencer, Barbara J.; Qiu, Larry D. (2001). "Keiretsu and Relationship-Specific Investment: A Barrier To Trade?". International Economic Review. 42 (4): 871–901. doi:10.1111/1468-2354.00138. ISSN 0020-6598.
- Spencer, Barbara J. (27 October 2005). "International outsourcing and incomplete contracts". Canadian Journal of Economics/Revue canadienne d'économique. 38 (4): 1107–1135. doi:10.1111/j.0008-4085.2005.00317.x. ISSN 0008-4085.
- Spencer, Barbara J.; Brander, James A. (2008), "Strategic Trade Policy", The New Palgrave Dictionary of Economics, London: Palgrave Macmillan UK, pp. 1–8, doi:10.1057/978-1-349-95121-5_2264-1, ISBN 978-1-349-95121-5
- Head, Keith; Spencer, Barbara J. (2017). "Oligopoly in international trade: Rise, fall and resurgence". Canadian Journal of Economics/Revue canadienne d'économique. 50 (5): 1414–1444. doi:10.1111/caje.12303. ISSN 0008-4085.
- Brander, James A.; Spencer, Barbara J. (2023). "Intellectual property infringement by foreign firms: Import protection through the ITC or court". Journal of International Economics. 140 103694. doi:10.1016/j.jinteco.2022.103694.

== Awards and recognitions ==
- Fellow of the Canadian Economics Association (CEA) (2018)
- President of the Canadian Economics Association (2004–2005)
- Harry Johnson Prize, Canadian Economics Association – Co-recipient (1981, with James Brander)
- 1990 – UBC Killam Faculty Research Prize in Arts, University of British Columbia.
- Co-developer recognition for Brander–Spencer model (Strategic Trade Theory) – widely cited foundational work in international economics.
- Most-cited paper in the Journal of International Economics from its inception in 1971 to 2000 (historical recognition
- Research Associate, National Bureau of Economic Research (NBER) (since 1985; long-term affiliation recognizing scholarly standing)
- Editorial and professional service appointments, including associate editor roles at leading economics journals such as the American Economic Review and the Journal of International Economics
- Featured CEA Fellow citation for outstanding contributions to international trade theory and industrial organization
