= David Sappington =

American economist

David E. M. Sappington
- Occupations: Economist, academic advisor, and author
- Awards: Inducted into the Phi Beta Kappa society, 1976; Distinguished Service Award, Public Utility Research Center, University of Florida, 2003; Distinguished Member Award, Transportation and Public Utilities Group, 2015; The Energy Journal’s Campbell Watkins Best Paper Award, 2017

Academic background
- Education: B.A. Economics, Haverford College 1976; M.A. Economics, Princeton University, 1978; Ph.D. Economics, Princeton University, 1980

David E. M. Sappington is an American economist, academic advisor, and author. He is an Eminent Scholar in the Department of Economics, and the Director of Robert F. Lanzillotti Public Policy Research Center at the University of Florida. His research focuses on the study of regulatory policy issues in the communications and energy sectors.

Sappington has published nearly 200 articles in economic journals and co-authored four books. He is an associate editor of The RAND Journal of Economics, and the Journal of Regulatory Economics. He is also a co-editor of Journal of Economics and Management Strategy.

== Education ==
Sappington received his bachelor's degree in economics from Haverford College in 1976. He earned his master's and doctoral degrees in economics from Princeton University in 1978 and 1980, respectively.

== Career ==
Sappington began his academic career in 1980 as an assistant professor of economics at the University of Michigan. He joined the faculty of the University of Pennsylvania in 1982. He joined the University of Florida as the Matherly Professor of Economics in 1989, and was awarded the title of Eminent Scholar in the Department of Economics in 1991.

Sappington also serves as the director of the Robert F. Lanzillotti Public Policy Research Center, and as a member of the advisory committee of the Digital Markets Initiative at the University of Florida.

Sappington was the Chief Economist for the U.S. Federal Communications Commission from 2001 to 2002. He also served as the President of the International Industrial Organization Society from 2008 to 2009.

== Research ==
Sappington has authored nearly 200 articles in economics journals. His work, some of which has been supported by the National Science Foundation, has been cited more than 20,000 times. His research spans many areas of microeconomic theory and public policy, with a particular focus on incentives and the design of regulatory policy in the communications and energy sectors. He has been recognized as one of the top scientists in the field of Economics and Finance by Research.com.

Sappington's research focuses on the optimal design of reward structures in the presence of limited information. His early research focuses on the special complications that arise when economic actors have limited resources, and so cannot be held financially liable for poor performance.

Sappington's later research emphasizes the optimal design of regulatory policy when the regulator does not have ready access to all relevant information. Historically, economists typically analyzed the design of regulatory policy in settings where the regulator is well-informed about all relevant elements of the environment. In practice, regulators (and policymakers more generally) seldom are perfectly informed about all relevant aspects of the environment in which they operate. Limited information complicates the design of the regulatory policy. Sappington's research examines the optimal design of regulatory policy when the regulated firm is better informed about the environment in which it operates than the regulator.

Sappington's research demonstrates that the optimal regulatory policy varies with the details of the prevailing information asymmetry. The optimal policy varies according to whether the firm's privileged information pertains to its fixed costs of production (which do not vary with the scale of its operation), to its variable costs (which vary with scale), or to both. Furthermore, the optimal policy can be quite distinct when the firm is better informed than the regulator about the demand for its products, rather than about its costs of producing these products.

Some of Sappington's research examines how well simple regulatory policies can replicate the performance of fully optimal policies. His research also examines the implications of advanced theoretical analysis for the practical implementation of regulatory policy, and examines the impact of incentive regulation on industry performance. Much of his early research focuses on the design of regulatory policy in the telecommunications industry. His more recent research examines policy design in the energy sector. This research includes analyses of the design of policies to promote energy conservation, distributed generation of electricity, energy storage to complement energy generation and transmission, and forward contracting to ensure the long-term supply of electricity at affordable prices.

== Awards and honors ==
- 2000 - Faculty Honoree, Anderson Scholars Program University of Florida
- 2003 - Distinguished Service Award, Public Utility Research Center, University of Florida
- 2008 - Elected President of the International Industrial Organization Society
- 2011 - Awarded Research Foundation Professorship, University of Florida
- 2015 - Distinguished Member Award, Transportation and Public Utilities Group
- 2017 - The Energy Journal’s Campbell Watkins Best Paper Award

== Bibliography ==
=== Books ===
- Designing Regulatory Policy with Limited Information (1987) ISBN 9783718603855 (with D. Besanko)
- Designing Incentive Regulation for the Telecommunications Industry (1996) ISBN 9780844740591 (with D. Weisman)
- Information Economics (Critical Concepts in Economics) (2014) ISBN 9780415812818 (with M. Baye)
- Economics of Regulation and Antitrust, Fifth Edition (2018) ISBN 9780262346917 (with K. Viscusi and J. Harrington)

=== Selected articles ===
- Sappington, D. (1983). Limited liability contracts between principal and agent. Journal of economic theory, 29(1), 1-21.
- Sappington, D. & Stiglitz, J. (1987). Privatization, information and incentives. Journal of policy analysis and management, 6(4), 567-585.
- Lewis, T. & Sappington, D. (1989). Countervailing incentives in agency problems. Journal of economic theory, 49(2), 294-313.
- Sappington, D. (1991). Incentives in principal-agent relationships. Journal of economic perspectives, 5(2), 45-66.
- Armstrong, M. & Sappington, D. (2006). Regulation, competition and liberalization. Journal of economic literature, 44(2), 325-366.
- Brown, D. & Sappington, D. (2017). Designing compensation for distributed solar generation: Is net metering ever optimal?” The energy journal, 38(3), 1-32.
