= Canadian Economics Association =

Academic association of Canadian economists

The Canadian Economics Association (CEA) is the academic association of Canadian economists. Its object is to advance economic knowledge through study and research, and to encourage informed discussion of economic questions. The Association will not take a partisan position on any question of practical politics, nor commit its members to a position thereupon.

The CEA was formed in 1967, when it split from the Canadian Political Science Association. As of 2016, the CEA had over 2,000 members in Canada and abroad. As a bilingual association, its official name in French is Association canadienne d'économique.

The CEA publishes the Canadian Journal of Economics/Revue canadienne d'économique (CJE) and organizes an annual conference that is usually held in the last week of May or first week of June. During the first week of December the CEA holds the Canadian Economics Employment Exchange (CEEE) in Toronto, providing an opportunity for recruitment of graduate students to faculty positions at universities, colleges, the Bank of Canada, and other agencies.

The CEA is governed by the Association's Board of Directors, which is composed sixteen Directors, who are elected by the CEA membership. The officers of the Association are the president, vice-president (who is always the conference organizer for the next year), deputy vice-president, past president, secretary, treasurer, and the editor of the Canadian Journal of Economics.

Since 1994, the CEA has awarded the Doug Purvis Memorial Prize for the past year's best work on Canadian economic policy.

The CEA is a non-profit corporation, registered under the Canada Not-for-Profit Corporations Act.

== CWEC and CWEN ==
In 2017 the Canadian Women Economists Committee (Comité des Femmes Économistes Canadiennes) (CWEC) was established as a standing committee of the Association with its purview being to follow on the previously more independent work of Canadian Women Economist Network (CWEN) (founded 1999). The CEA argues that the move from CWEN to CWEC was because the responsibility of supporting and promoting women does not just fall on the female membership, but on the profession as a whole.
