= Yuri Poluneev =

International economist

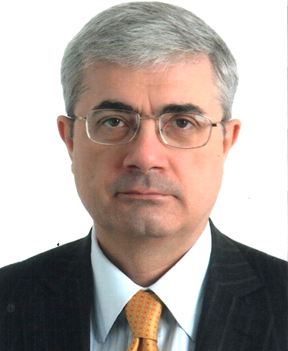
Yuri Poluneev

Yuri Poluneev (Ukrainian: Юрій Володимирович Полунєєв) is a Ukrainian economist, academic, and former public official. He has held leadership roles in international finance, national economic policy, and central banking.

== Early life and education ==
Poluneev obtained a degree in international economics in 1978 from Kyiv State University, where he also studied English and Arabic. He later earned a PhD in international economics from the same institution.

He completed a management program at the University of Toronto in 1991–1992 and pursued finance and accounting studies at the London Business School in 2000.

== Career ==
=== International Finance ===
From 1996 to 2005, Poluneev served on the board of directors of the European Bank for Reconstruction and Development (EBRD), representing Ukraine, Romania, Moldova, Georgia, and Armenia.

He later became President of the International Management Institute (MIM‑Kyiv) in 2005–2007.

=== Academia and Research ===
Poluneev has authored 13 books and more than 100 professional publications covering topics such as national competitiveness, banking reform, and economic policy. He also served as editor-in-chief of the journal Monitor of Competitiveness.

In his research, he has promoted a “technology for economic breakthrough” model that applies competitiveness‑index metrics to inform policy.

=== Public Service ===
Poluneev was appointed a member of the Supervisory Board of the National Bank of Ukraine in September 2008. He held the position of Deputy Head of that board.

He was also a People’s Deputy of Ukraine (member of the Verkhovna Rada) during the VI convocation (2007–2012). Poluneev participated in legislative work on banking reform, deposit insurance, consumer protection, and debt restructuring.

In public statements, he has argued for controlled, gradual devaluation of the hryvnia under certain economic conditions.

== Civic Engagement ==
In 2005, Poluneev founded the Council on Competitiveness of Ukraine, a non‑governmental think tank focused on national economic policy and competitiveness. He has served as its head.

He has also served on the board of the British‑Ukrainian Society and co‑chaired the UK–Ukraine Inter‑Parliamentary Group.

== Selected Works ==
One of his notable publications is Ukraine: Ten Shocks, a policy‑oriented analysis of Ukraine’s economic challenges.

== Views and Influence ==
Poluneev has called for an “economic breakthrough” for Ukraine, emphasizing the elimination of structural lags in competitiveness, promotion of innovation, and achieving stable growth.

He has also spoken publicly about the role of central bank policy in managing currency risk and macroeconomic stability.

== Social activities and personal profile ==
In 2005, Yuri Poluneev founded an NGO “Council on Competitiveness of Ukraine”. It mobilized prominent personalities from various venues of life with the mission to initiate the public discussion involving authorities, business, civil society and education (research) as well as mass media to elevate competitiveness to the forefront of public awareness and policy-making in Ukraine. By 2008, the competitiveness theory has formally become an integral part of the government economic policy setting and strategic thinking. He had also focused on the reform in the financial consumer protection by preparing with the USAID assistance a number of new draft legislation focusing on consumer credit and consumer protection in accordance with the OECD guidelines.

Yuri Poluneev was a member of the board of the British Ukrainian Society and had been an active promoter of closer political and business links between the two countries, especially when served as a co-chairman of the UK-Ukraine Inter-Parliamentary Group (2007-2012).

Poluneev actively contributed to charitable activities. From proceeds of sale of his own music album, he founded the charity “Music – to Children” (2004), which provided financing and assistance to teach disabled children fine arts and music.

Yuri Poluneev speaks fluent English, Ukrainian and Russian. Has a good knowledge of German, reads Arabic. He is married and has four children.
