= Hugo Richard Meyer =

American author and economist

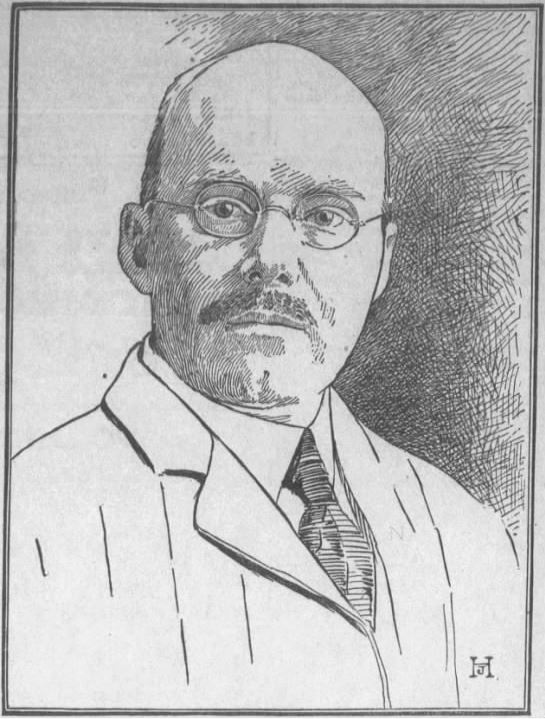
- Born: April 1, 1866; Cincinnati, Ohio
- Died: 1923 (aged 56–57)
- Education: Harvard College
- Occupations: Economist, writer

Hugo Richard Meyer (April 1, 1866 – 1923) was an American author and economist concerned with public ownership of telegraph, phone, railway and other utilities.

== Biography ==
Meyer graduated from Harvard College in 1892, and attended the Harvard Graduate School in 1892-96 where he received an A.M. in 1894. He was instructor in political economy at Harvard in 1897–1903, and was assistant professor in that subject at the University of Chicago in 1904–05. After 1907, he resided in Melbourne where he was writing a history of state ownership in Victoria, Australia.

== Works ==
- Government Regulation of Railroad Rates (1905)
- Municipal Ownership in Great Britain (1906)
- The British State Telegraphs: A Study of the Problem of a Large Body of Civil Servants in a Democracy. Macmillan. 1907.
- Public Ownership and the Telephone in Great Britain: Restriction of the Industry by the State and the Municipalities. Macmillan. 1907.
- "Hugo Richard Meyer". JSTOR.
