= O. Fred Boucke =

American economist

- Born: 1881
- Died: 1935 (aged 53–54)
- Other name: Oswald Fred Boucke
- Occupation: Economist

Oswald Fred Boucke Ph.D. (1881 in Bremerhaven–1935) was an American economist. He was a professor at Pennsylvania State University. He is mostly known as the author of The Development of Economics published in 1921.

Boucke emigrated to the United States in 1900, and became a citizen in 1926.

== Works ==
- (1916). Rising Costs of Living, George Banta Publishing Company.
- (1920). The Limits of Socialism, The Macmillan Company.
- (1921). The Development of Economics, 1750-1900, The Macmillan Company.
- (1922). A Critique of Economics, Doctrinal and Methodological, The Macmillan Company.
- (1925). Principles of Economics, The Macmillan Company.
- (1932). Laissez Faire and After, Thomas Y. Crowell Company.
- (1933). Europe and the American Tariff, Thomas Y. Crowell Company.
