= Toulouse School of Law =

Law school in France

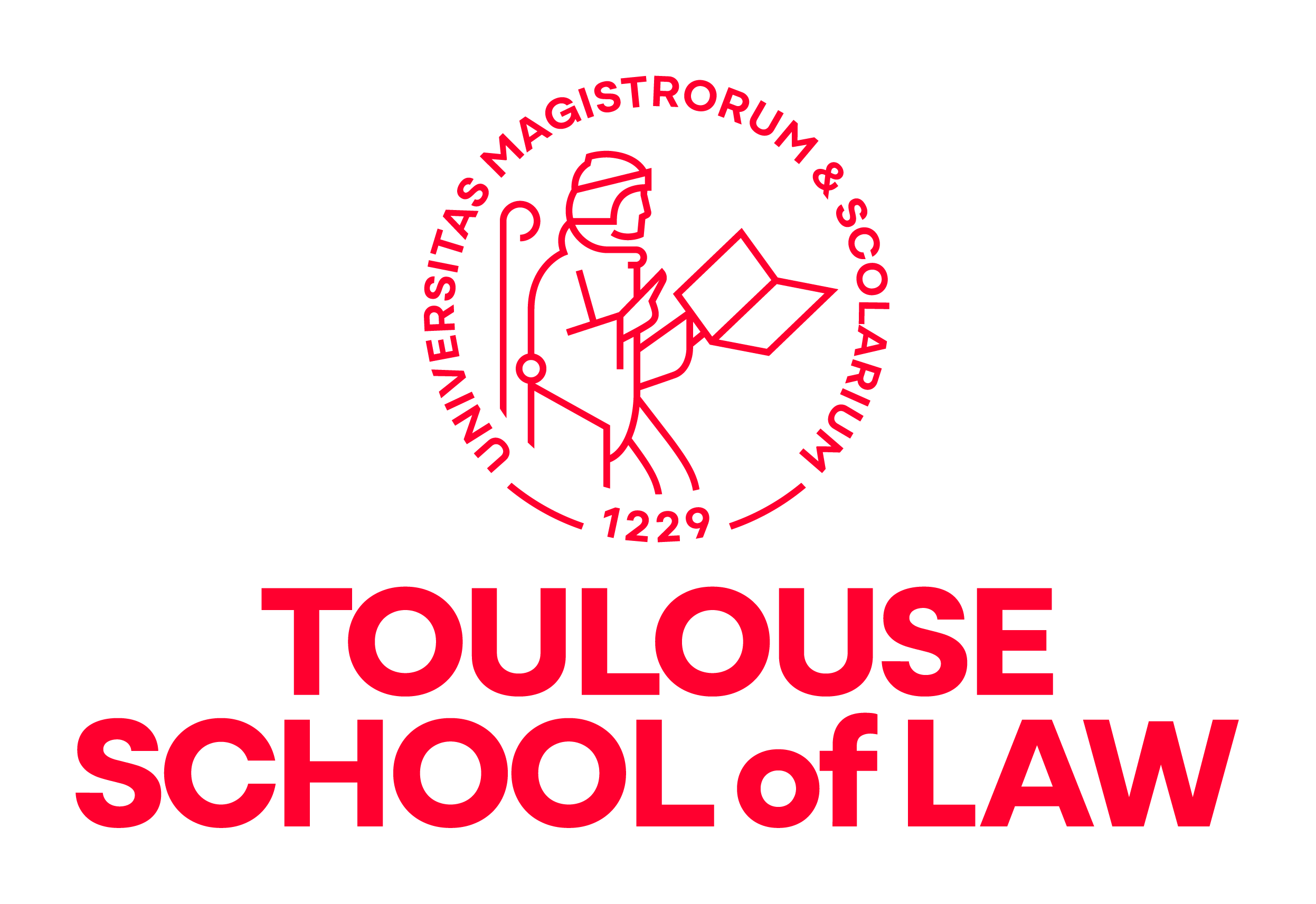
- Former name: Faculté de droit et science politique
- Motto: Think law, teach law, shape the future
- Type: Public research university
- Established: 1229
- Parent institution: Toulouse Capitole university
- Affiliations: CDDSP
- Dean: Matthieu Poumarède
- Students: 9000
- Doctoral students: 300
- Location: Toulouse and Montauban, France
- Campus: 2 rue du doyen Gabriel Marty 31400 Toulouse
- Website: https://tls-droit.ut-capitole.fr
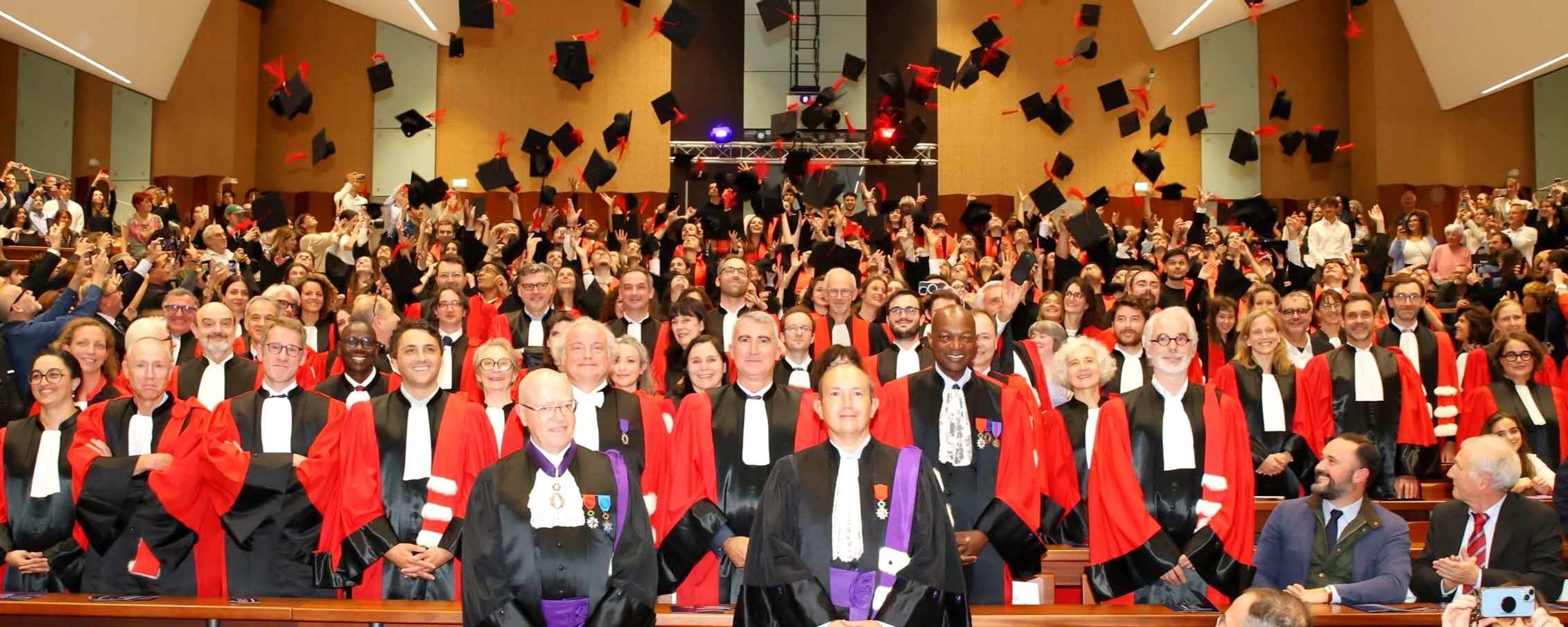

Toulouse School of Law

The Toulouse School of Law (École de droit de Toulouse) is a member of Toulouse Capitole University. The institution offers undergraduate and graduate degrees in law through a range of academic programs, work-study programs, and continuing education.

Located in the heart of the city of Toulouse, the Toulouse School of Law brings together 10,000 students, including apprentices and continuing education students, 170 academic staff, 300 doctoral candidates, and nearly 1,000 professional lecturers.

The Toulouse School of Law promotes professional integration, internationalisation, and pedagogical innovation in legal studies on the Toulouse campus and the satellite campus at Montauban.

The School prepares students for competitive examinations through the Institute of Judicial Studies (IEJ). It offers international programs at the European School of Law (ESL) and dual degrees with the Toulouse School of Economics, the Toulouse School of Management, and Sciences Po Toulouse.

== History ==
=== Between 1229 and 1793: the rise of legal education in Toulouse ===
==== Creation of the Faculty of Law ====
The origins of the Toulouse School of Law date back to the creation of the studium of Toulouse in the 13th century. The Treaty of Paris of 12 April 1229 established four faculties in Toulouse: arts, theology, grammar, and canon law.

A few years later, in 1233, Pope Gregory IX confirmed the creation of the studium of Toulouse by papal bull, granting it the same privileges as the University of Paris. This bull placed masters, students, and staff under the jurisdiction of the Church and required local authorities to protect and finance the institution until 1239.

==== Medieval period ====
During the medieval period, the university was organised around several faculties, mainly arts, law, and theology. The Faculty of Law quickly became the most important: although formally ranked after theology, it was the most prestigious and the most attended. Throughout the Ancien Régime, civil and canon law remained the flagship disciplines in Toulouse, contributing to the university's overall reputation. Several features illustrate the medieval influence of the Toulouse Faculty of Law. At the end of the 13th and beginning of the 14th centuries, it reached its peak, training eminent jurists—known as the Doctores Tholosani—whose influence extended beyond the region. Toulouse law professors were often close to political power, serving as advisers to princes or being recruited by the papacy for high-ranking positions. Several Avignon popes in the 14th century had studied or taught law in Toulouse, including John XXII, Innocent VI, and Urban V. By the end of the 14th century, the University of Toulouse had approximately one thousand students (all male), many of whom studied law.

Law studies lasted between five and eight years. After several years of attendance, a student could obtain the degree of bachelor. By commenting on legal texts for beginners, the student could then become a licentiate after a final oral examination similar to a thesis defence. The title of Doctor of Law was largely honorary at the time and could even be purchased, as the title was sometimes "monetised" during that period.

==== Modern Period ====
During the 16th and 17th centuries, royal authority gradually intervened to secularise and modernise legal education in Toulouse. From 1470 onwards, the Parliament of Toulouse gained increasing influence over the university, particularly regarding the appointment of lay law professors. Under Louis XIV, the number of law professors was increased, and in 1679 a reform required law faculties to teach French law (customary royal law) alongside Roman law. Initially resisted by a university strongly attached to Roman law, this reform marked a significant evolution of the curriculum and introduced contemporary French law into legal education, foreshadowing its post-Revolutionary importance. At the same time, recruitment procedures for academic staff became more formalised and demanding, involving competitive examinations and royal approval, which sometimes delayed the arrival of new talent. A well-known example illustrates these administrative delays: the famous humanist jurist Jacques Cujas (1522–1590) taught at the Toulouse Faculty of Law in the 16th century. Although he applied for a professorial chair, the recruitment process dragged on. Impatient and sought after by other universities, Cujas left Toulouse prematurely in 1576, before the results were even announced (they were published two years later). His departure was deeply regretted, as he later achieved great renown in Bourges and Valence as one of the foremost commentators of the Corpus Juris Civilis.

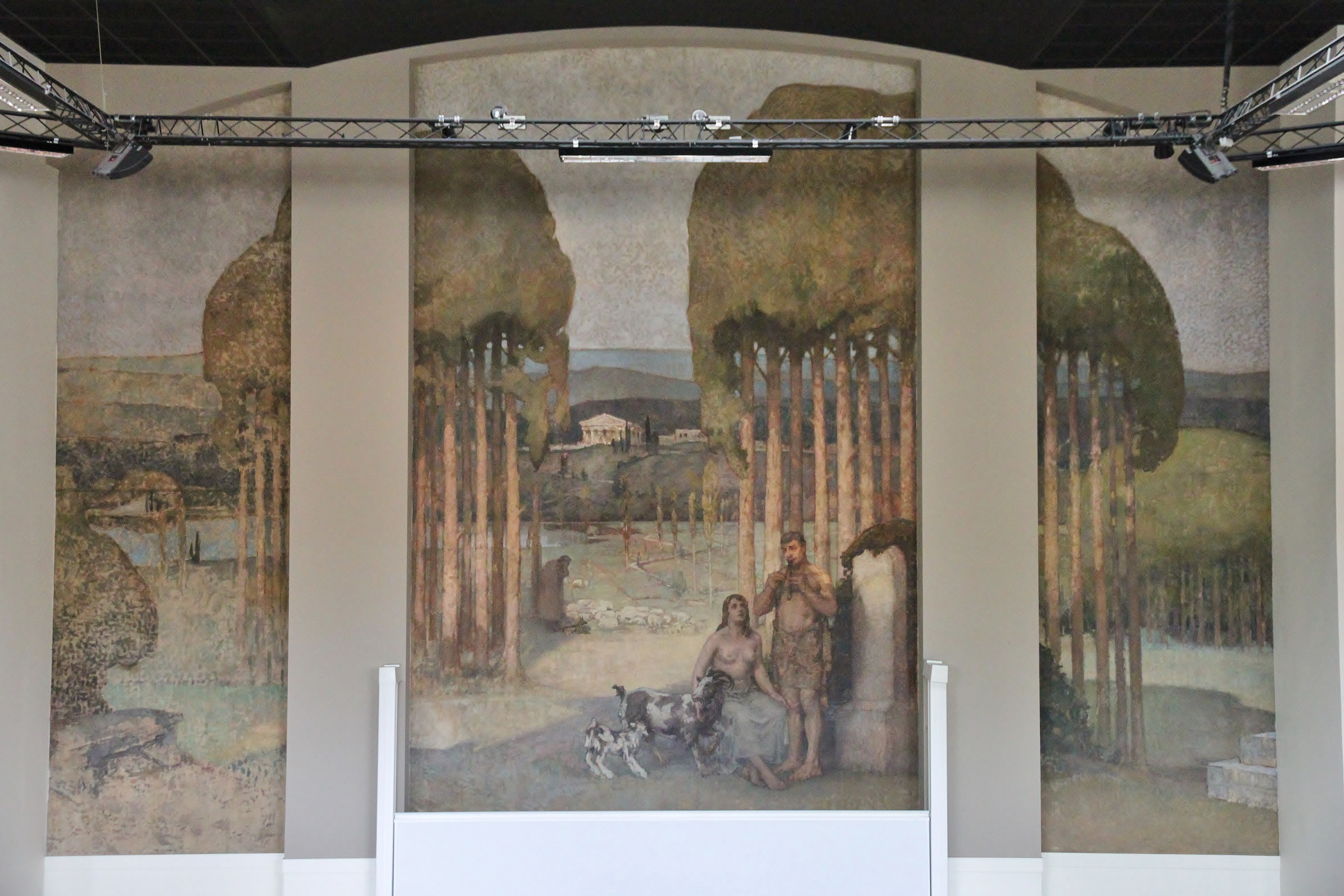
Fresque of 1934 representing Ancient Greece in the Cujas Amphitheater

Despite these difficulties, the Faculty of Law of Toulouse continued to flourish during the 17th and 18th centuries. Several notable figures are associated with this period:

- Pierre de Fermat (1601–1665): although not a professor at the university, this magistrate at the Parliament of Toulouse and mathematical genius studied law in Toulouse. His dual career illustrates the close ties between the legal world and scientific knowledge. Fermat remains famous for his theorem, whose proof was completed only in 1994.
- Emmanuel Maignan (1602–1676): a Minim friar from Toulouse (also known as François de Maignan), who taught theology outside the university and became known for his work in optics. Louis XIV appointed him a member (and president) of the French Academy, recognising his scientific contributions.

In terms of infrastructure, the Parliament of Toulouse supported the training of local jurists by constructing three large amphitheatres dedicated to legal teaching in the 16th century. These amphitheatres were located on a site that still corresponds today to the heart of Toulouse Capitole University (near to Rue Lautmann).

==== Between 1793 and 2024: Suspension and revival ====
On 15 September 1793, the National Convention abolished "colleges of full exercise and the faculties of theology, medicine, arts, and law throughout the territory of the Republic". It was not until 21 March 1796, with the opening of the Central School of Haute-Garonne, that legal education gradually resumed in Toulouse.

Under the law of 22 Ventôse Year XII (13 March 1804), the decree of 21 September 1804 established twelve law schools in France, including one in Toulouse. The Toulouse School of Law was inaugurated on 10 November 1805, before resuming the name Faculty of Law in 1808.

== Creation of the Toulouse School of Law in 2025 ==
The Toulouse School of Law was officially created on 1 January 2025 by a ministerial decree dated 11 July 2024. It is the first law institution in France to be granted the status of an internal school within a university.

It succeeds the former Faculty of Law and Political Science, which previously operated as a teaching and research unit (UFR).

On 24 June 2025, the Board of Directors of the Toulouse School of Law elected Martine de Boisdeffre as its president.

== Location ==
The Toulouse School of Law is located on the Toulouse Capitole University campus, in the city centre of Toulouse and, since 1994, in Montauban at the Centre Universitaire de Tarn et Garonne.

== Education ==
=== Admission ===
The Toulouse School of Law is a public higher education institution offering both non-selective and selective programmes at undergraduate, master's, and doctoral levels in law.

It prepares students for competitive examinations through the Institute of Judicial Studies (IEJ) and offers international double degrees within the European School of Law (ESL).

=== Programmes ===
==== Bachelor's degrees ====
The Toulouse School of Law offers nineteen undergraduate programmes, including:

- the Bachelor of Law;
- selective interdisciplinary double degrees: Economics and Law (with the Toulouse School of Economics), Law and Management (with the Toulouse School of Management), and Law and Sciences Po Toulouse;
- selective international double degrees offered through the European School of Law.

==== Masters ====
The Toulouse School of Law offers 49 selective master's programmes across 17 fields, including:

- Business Law
- Ethical Law
- Tax Law
- Real Estate Law
- International and European Law
- Notarial Law
- Digital Law
- Heritage Law
- Criminal Law and Criminology
- Private Law
- Public Law
- Health Law
- Labour and Social Law
- Legal History and Institutions
- Administration and Liquidation of Distressed Companies
- Political Science
- Management

=== PhD ===
The Toulouse School of Law awards the Doctorate in Law within the framework of the Doctoral School of Law and Political Science, jointly operated with Sciences Po Toulouse.

=== Continuing education ===
The Toulouse School of Law offers professional training programmes through the Executive Education and Digital University of Toulouse Capitole University.

== Notable figures associated with the institution ==
=== Deans ===
==== 19th century ====
- Barthélémy Jouvent (1809-1816 et 1818–1821)
- Auguste Jamme (1816–1818)
- Jean Raymond Marc de Bastoulh (1821–1830)
- Frédéric François Félicité Malpel (1830–1841)
- Auguste Laurens (1841–1855)
- Osmin Benech (1855)
- Édouard Delpech (1856–1865)
- Adolphe Chauveau (1865–1868)
- François Constantin Dufour (1869–1879)
- Henry Bonfils (1879–1888)
- Joseph Paget (1889–1900)

==== 20th–21st centuries ====
- Antonin Deloume (1900–1906)
- Maurice Hauriou (1906–1926)
- Georges Boyer (1949–1954)
- Louis Boyer
- Henry Roussillon (1994–2003)
- Bernard Beignier (2003–2012)
- Hugues Kenfack (2012–2017)
- Philippe Nélidoff (2017–2022)
- Matthieu Poumarède (2022-)

==== Famous professors ====
- Jacques Cujas (1522–1590), humanist jurist and legal scholar
- Eugène Poubelle (1831–1907), Prefect of Paris and inventor of the waste container commonly known as the "poubelle"
- André Hauriou (1899–1973), legal scholar and academic
- Ernest Wallon (1851–1921), first president of Stade Toulousain
- Maurice Hauriou (1856–1929), jurist and professor of public law
- Pierre Hébraud (1905–1983), legal scholar and academic
- Georges Vedel (1910–2002), professor of law, jurist, and member of the Constitutional Court of France
- Gabriel Marty (1905–1973), jurist and professor of law
- Pierre Montané de la Roque (1921–1981), legal scholar and academic
- Germain Sicard (1928–2016), jurist and professor of law
- André Cabanis (born 1947), legal historian and professor of law

==== Famous alumni ====
- Marguerite Dilhan, the first woman to practise as a lawyer in France and to plead before the Cour d'assises; holder of a Bachelor of Law degree
- Nassim Belkhayat, CEO and co-founder of Neo Motors based in Morocco
- Yaël Braun-Pivet, President of the National Assembly of France
- Jacques Cujas (1522-1590), legal expert
- Pierre de Fermat (1601–1665), magistrate and mathematician
- Cho Hyun, Minister of Foreign Affairs of South Korea
- Gaston Monnerville (1897-1991), politician and lawyer
- Edgar Morin, sociologist and philosopher
- Mustafa Kamil Pasha (1874-1908), Egyptian lawyer, journalist, and nationalist activist.

== Rankings ==
=== International rankings ===
QS World University Rankings
year	global ranking	national ranking
2024	301-350	10
2025	301-350	10

Times Higher Education (THE)
year	Global ranking	National ranking
2025	251-300	5
2026	251-300	3 (tied)

=== National rankings ===
Le Figaro
Année	Ranking
2023	12
2024	9
2025	7

Le Nouvel Obs
Year	Ranking
2023	46
2024	26
2025	15

== Research ==
Research at the Toulouse School of Law is conducted within the research unit "Toulouse School of Law – Research", which brings together 160 tenured academic staff in law, political science, sociology, and information and communication sciences.

Toulouse School of Law – Research is structured into seven departments:

- the Toulouse Centre for Legal History and Political Thought (CTHDIP)
- the Institute of Private Law (IDP)
- the Institute for European, International and Comparative Law (IRDEIC)
- the Institute for Legal Studies in Urban Planning, Construction and the Environment (IEJUC)
- the Institute of Space Law, Territories, Culture and Communication (IDETCOM)
- the Maurice Hauriou Institute 5IMH)

Toulouse School of Law – Research also includes temporary research groups and endowed chairs, such as the Sirius Chair and the Jean Monnet Chairs EDHIL (Nathalie de Groove Valdeyron) and EURINS (Eugénie Fabries Lecea).
