= Maurice Hauriou =

French legal scholar (1856–1929)

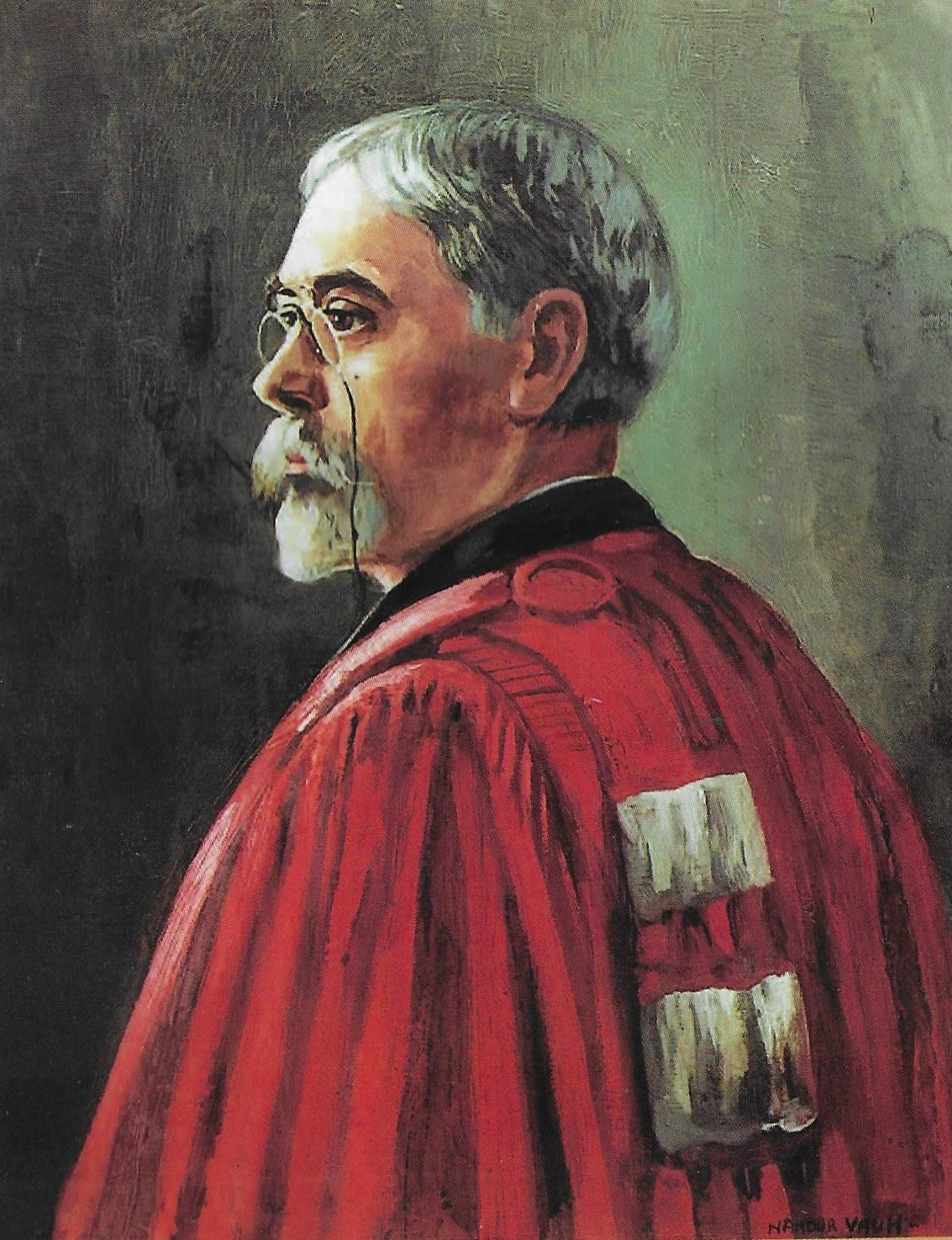
- Born: August 17, 1856; Ladiville (Charente)
- Died: March 12, 1929 (aged 72); Toulouse (Haute-Garonne)
- Education: License in Law, University of Bordeaux (1876) Doctorat in Law, University of Bordeaux (1879) Agrégation in Law, University of Toulouse (1882)
- Occupation: Doyen (Dean) of the Toulouse School of Law at the Toulouse Capitole University (1921-1926)
- Employer: University of Toulouse
- Known for: Jurist, sociologist, academic
- Children: André Hauriou
- Honours: Officier de la Légion d'honneur Ordre des Palmes académiques

Maurice Hauriou (17 August 1856 – 12 March 1929) was a French jurist and sociologist whose writings shaped French administrative law in the late 19th and early 20th century.

Hauriou taught public law at the Toulouse School of Law at the Toulouse Capitole University beginning in 1888, and constitutional law from 1920 on. His work gave French administrative law a new dogmatic basis, including through his textbooks Précis de droit administratif et de droit public général (1892), Précis élémentaire de droit administratif (1925), Précis de droit constitutionnel (1923) and Principes de droit public (1910).

== Biography ==
Hauriou studied at the Lycée d'Angoulême. He studied law at the University of Bordeaux where he would obtain his license in 1876 and eventually his doctorate in 1879. He especially distinguished himself in Roman law as well as civil law.

After failing twice at Agrégation, in 1880 and 1881, he achieved the first place in this examination in 1882. This success is particularly significant, as the agrégation of 1882 was referred to as the "Great examination" (French: grand concours), because of its notable participants: Maurice Hauriou at 1st place, Henry Berthélemy at the 4th, Léon Duguit at the 6th, Léon Michoud at the 15th. These figures, alongside Adhémar Esmein and Raymond Carré de Malberg are considered the "founders of modern French public law" as per Philippe Malaurie.

== Career at the Faculty of Law of Toulouse ==
On 1 January 1883, Hauriou was named aggregated professor at the Faculty of Law of Toulouse, where he was in charge of the History of Law course. He was distant from the rest of the faculty due to his quarrels with his Dean, and the refusal of his demand to be transferred to Paris.

On the January 17, 1883, he obtained a chaire d'État, a permanent position as a Professor to teach the Digest, and gave a course of the history of French law until 1888. He lost this position in less than a year, in November 1883, and would not reobtain it until four years later, in November 1887.

However, a few months later on 24 March 1888, he was tenured as Professor of administrative law in his chair d'Etat. He would occupy this position until May 7, 1920, for more than 32 years at the Faculty of Law of Toulouse. In 1906, he became the Dean, which he remained until his retirement. At the same time, he also gave courses in comparative civil legislation, public law, administrative law, social science, and the principles of public law. On May 7, 1920, he left his chair d'État in administrative law to occupy one in constitutional law until his retirement in 1926. It appears that he continued to give lectures as a lecturer after his retirement, but it is not possible to know precisely until when.

== Honors ==
Hauriou was appointed Officer of the Legion of Honour in 1929.
