= Franco-German Legal Centre =

The Franco-German Legal Centre (French: Centre Juridique Franco-Allemand; CJFA) is a university cooperation institution affiliated with the Faculty of Law at Saarland University. The CJFA collaborates with longstanding partner institutions:

- Paris-Panthéon-Assas University (formerly Paris II)
- University of Strasbourg
- University of Lorraine

In addition to these initial partnerships, further collaborations have been established with the following universities: Lyon 2, Nice Côte d’Azur, Toulouse I Capitole, and the International University of Tunis.
