= Toulouse School of Economics =

School within Toulouse Capitole University

Coordinates: 43.6054°N 1.4322°E

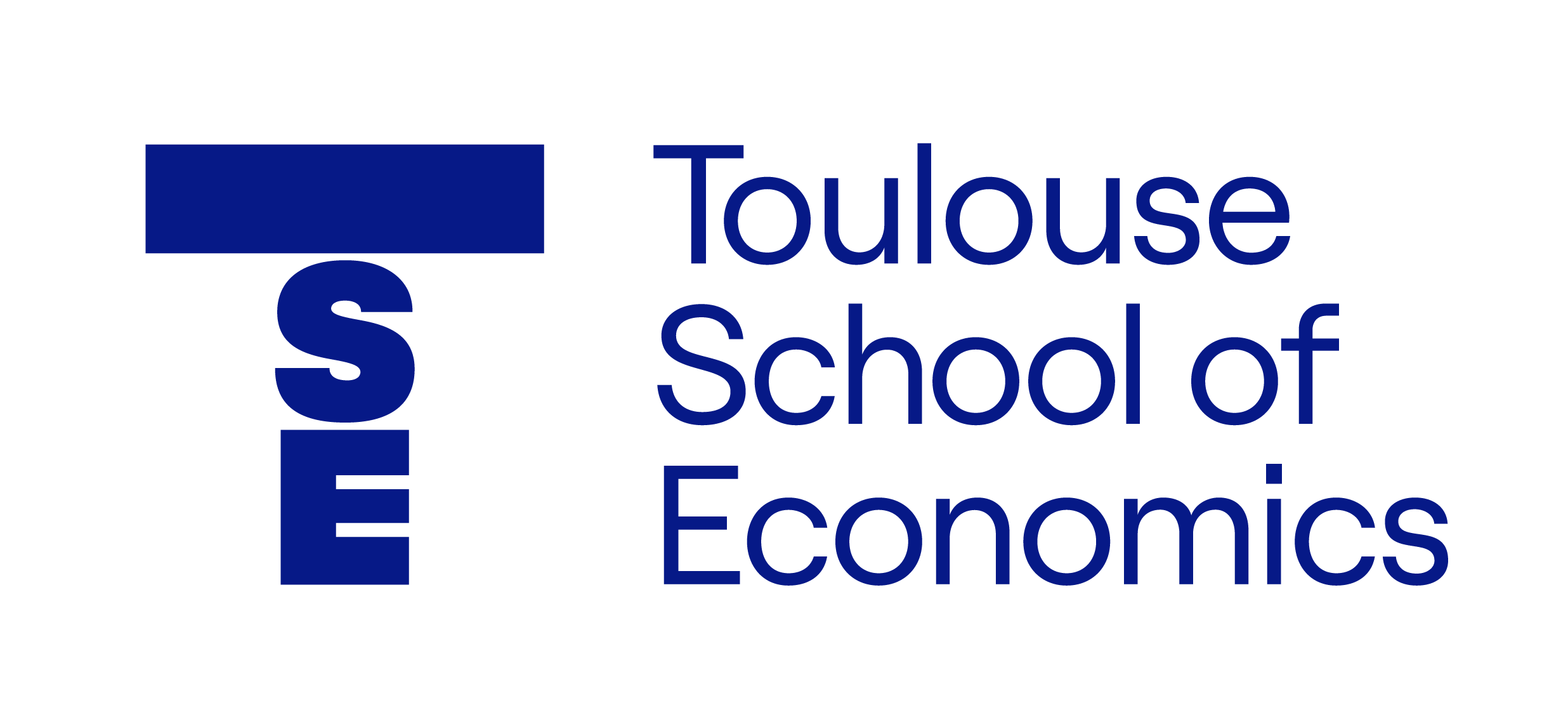
- Other name: TSE
- Motto: Pour le bien commun
- Motto in English: For the common good
- Type: Economics departement
- Established: 2007, as an independent institution 2011, creation of a school of economics within the Toulouse Capitole University 2023, new status of "Grand Etablissement"
- Academic affiliations: Communauté d'universités et établissements de Toulouse; Toulouse Capitole University; as a research center: School for Advanced Studies in the Social Sciences; École Polytechnique
- Dean: François Poinas
- Director: Victoria Barham
- Location: Toulouse, France
- Campus: Toulouse Capitole University
- Website: www.tse-fr.eu

Toulouse School of Economics (TSE; French: École d'économie de Toulouse; Occitan: Escòla d'Economia de Tolosa) is a school of economics, affiliated with Toulouse Capitole University, a constituent college of the Communauté d'universités et établissements de Toulouse. It is located in the city of Toulouse, France.

The Toulouse School of Economics offers both undergraduate degrees (licence) and master's degrees, in a variety of fields related but not limited to economics such as data science, statistics, and mathematical economics. TSE also has a PhD program with two years of coursework, in the style of American PhD programs in economics. Many of the faculty members are fellows of the Econometric Society and the European Economic Association. TSE scholars have also received numerous national and international awards, including the Nobel Memorial Prize in Economic Sciences and the CNRS Gold Medal, the highest scientific honor in France (both Jean Tirole in 2007 and 2014), and the Yrjö Jahnsson Award, granted every two years to the best European economist under 45 (Jean-Jacques Laffont and Jean Tirole in 2003, Gilles Saint-Paul in 2007). TSE is consistently ranked among the very best in Europe in rankings based on quality-weighted publications. According to RePEc, TSE was ranked the 8th most productive research department of economics in the world and the 2nd in Europe by February 2023.

Classes are taught in both French and English. Currently, the school has around 2400 students from over 90 nationalities and 150 full faculty members. In 2014, the then chairman Professor Jean Tirole was awarded the Nobel Prize in Economics Sciences for his analysis of market power and regulation. In 2007, the French government and the Academy of Sciences chose TSE as one of 13 "Réseaux Thématiques de Recherche Avancée" (RTRA) across all fields, enabling the creation of a private foundation, the Jean-Jacques Laffont Foundation, which serves to foster world class research in economics and related social sciences at TSE. Its research department is also affiliated with the School for Advanced Studies in the Social Sciences and the École Polytechnique.

TSE researchers have developed strong relationships with economic actors as regulators, corporations and other various institutions. They take an active part in policy-making in France (The French Council of Economic Advisors) as well as for a variety of institutions in Europe (The European Commission) and the rest of the world.

== History ==
The history of the Toulouse School of Economics as an autonomous entity began in 1981 when Jean-Jacques Laffont founded GREMAQ, a research laboratory in mathematical economics. A decade later, in 1990, the Industrial Economics Institute (IDEI) was established. In 1996, the “Manufacture des Tabacs” campus was inaugurated, providing a new home for the growing community of economists in Toulouse.

In 2006, The Toulouse School of Economics was founded, bringing together GREMAQ and IDEI. The following year, the Jean-Jacques Laffont-TSE foundation was established, launching TSE's first fundraising campaign.

In 2011, TSE expanded its offerings with the launch of the education branch and the creation of the Institute for Advanced Study in Toulouse (IAST). A year later, the French Minister of Research, Laurent Wauquiez, selected TSE for the certificate of ‘laboratory of excellence’ (LABEX) in the second call for projects. The LABEX label is intended to attract and retain top international researchers to France and promote innovation by providing funding for ambitious research projects. LABEX-certified laboratories received a total of €101 million in funding; among those, TSE was awarded €15 million until 2020 and was selected "for its original approach to contemporary economic issues, aiming to understand how incentives influence the behaviors of economic actors and determine market outcomes".

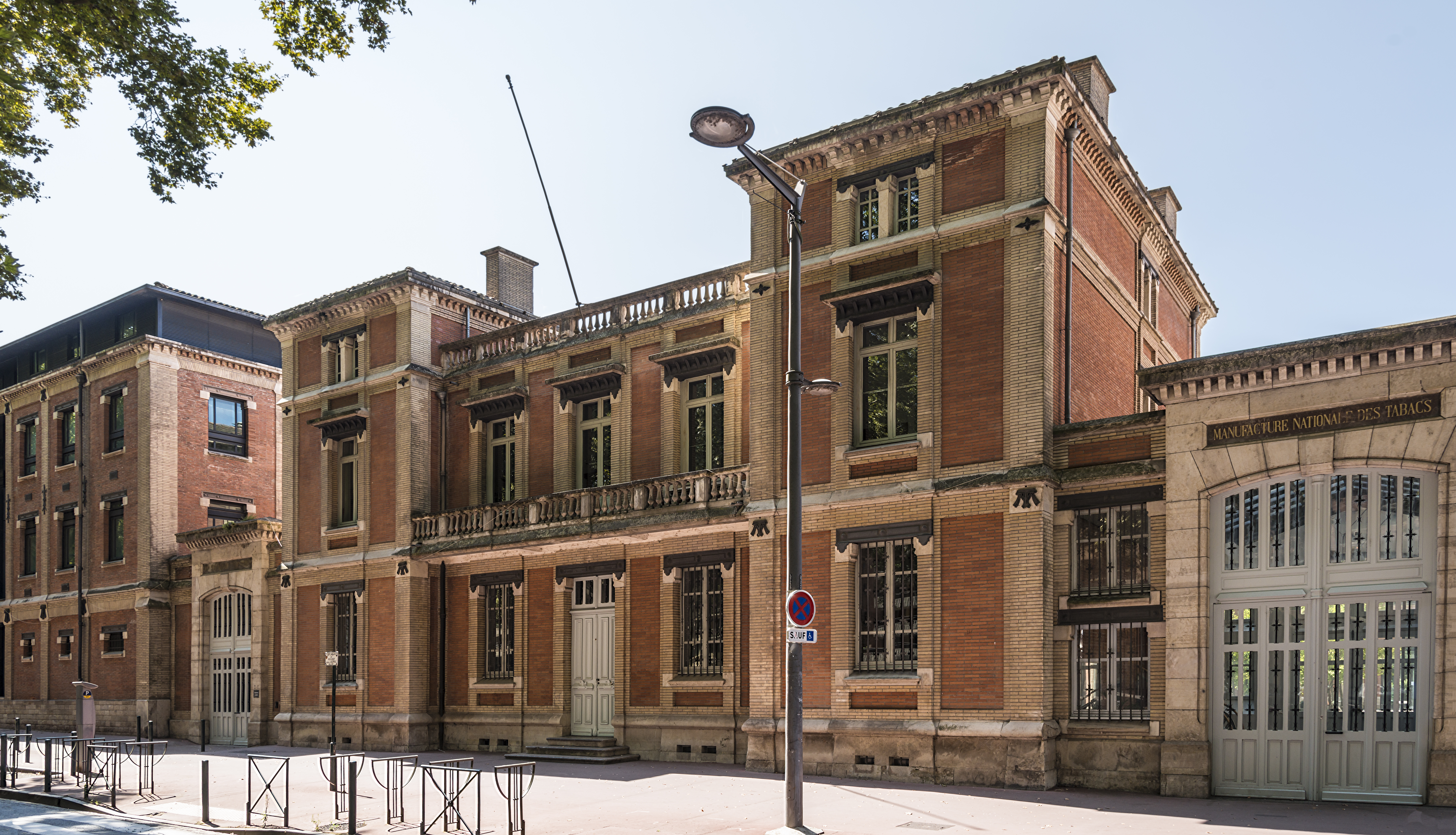
The Manufacture des Tabacs, TSE's historical campus.

In 2014, TSE received international recognition when Jean Tirole was awarded the Nobel Memorial Prize in Economic Sciences. TSE continued to grow in the years that followed, launching the Chaire numérique Jean-Jacques Laffont in 2015 which provided the university with €250,000 yearly in funding for projects related to digitalization.

TSE then launched its second fundraising campaign in 2016. That same year, TSE-R, a semi-independent research unit (Unité mixte de recherche), was established on TSE's premises. TSE celebrated its 10th anniversary in 2017 and launched the TSE Energy & Climate center. In 2018, TSE established partnerships (TSE-P) and the TSE center label, and launched the TSE Digital center and TSE Sustainable Finance center.

In 2020, TSE unveiled its new building designed by Grafton Architects, and in the following year, it continued to expand its research focus with the launch of the TSE Health Center, TSE Infrastructure & Network Center, and TSE Competition Policy & Regulation Center. In 2025, TSE further advanced its mission to address key societal challenges by launching its seventh center, the Human Capital Center.

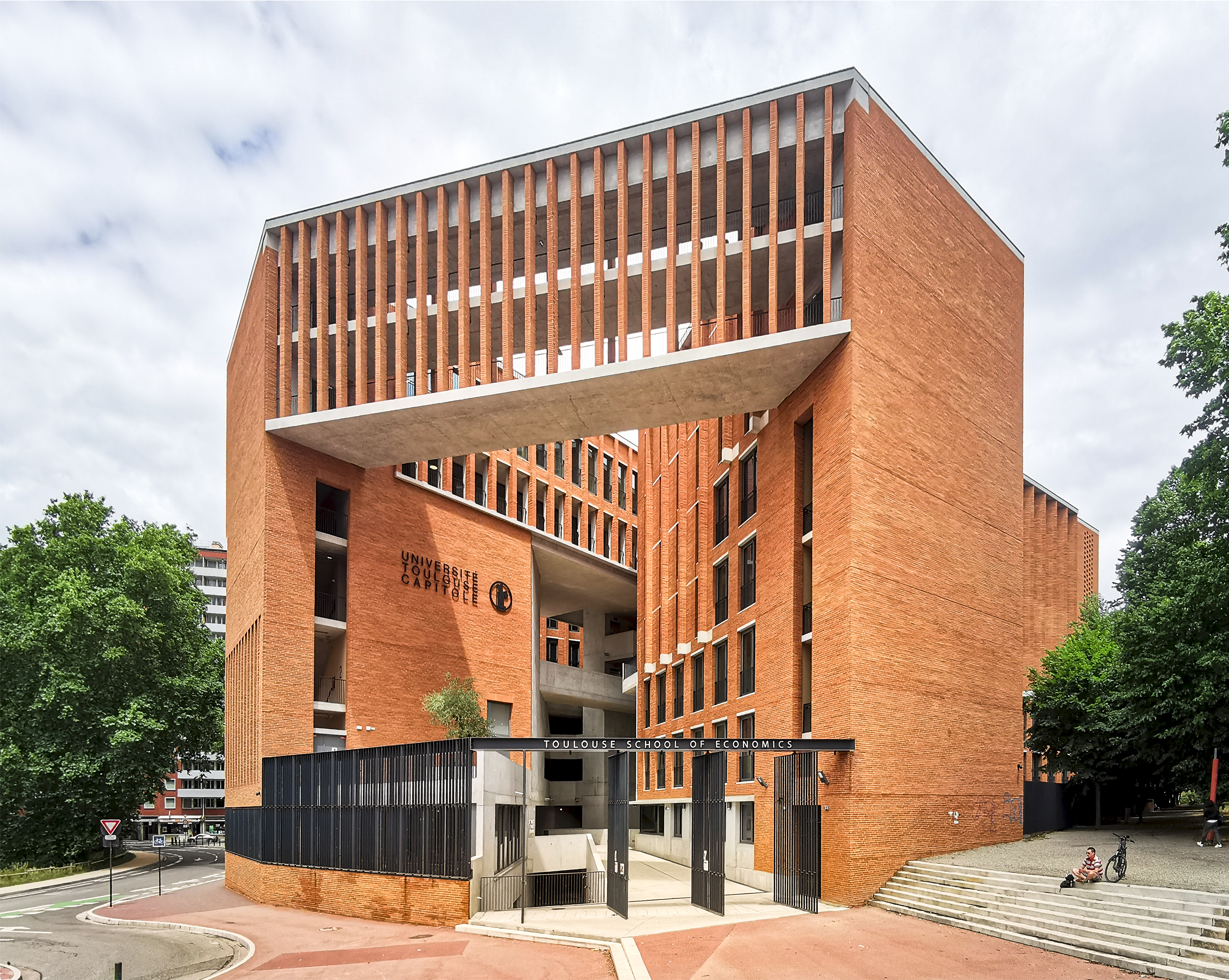
The new TSE building.

In 2023, among some controversy with the Toulouse Capitole University, TSE obtained the status of grand établissement. Universities recognized as grand établissements are endowed with higher freedom of governance in terms of selectivity in admission, amount of their tuition fees, and research focus, as well as the right to represent themselves autonomously in judiciary matters.

== Education ==
=== Admission ===
Admission to the Toulouse School of Economics is selective and occurs at the end of the first two years of the preparatory degree of the Toulouse Capitole University in economics and management, and from the first year in the double degree economics and law, and economics and mathematics.

The number of students admitted to the third year is set at 250, of which about 30% come from outside institutions.

=== Bachelor's degrees ===
TSE offers three bachelor's degree programs, consisting of two years at the Toulouse 1 Capitole University and one year at TSE.

- Bachelor's degree in Economics

TSE's bachelor's in economics is designed to train students in economic analysis and econometrics. The capacity of the bachelor's degree in Economics is 60 places from the beginning of the 2020 academic year.

- Double degree in Economics and Mathematics

The double degree course in economics and mathematics at TSE is composed of a degree in mathematics and computer science applied to human and social sciences (MIASHS), and the degree in economics at TSE. The aim of this course is to train students in mathematical and computer tools for application to human sciences such as economics and econometrics. The capacity of the Economics and Mathematics degree is 60 places. This course also allows access to a magister degree in economics and statistics.

- Double degree in Economics and Law

The double degree course in law and economics is a combination of the economics degree at TSE and the law degree at TSL. This course allows students to pursue both legal and economic fields, with a prevalence for multi-disciplinary issues such as competition law and market regulation. The capacity of the Economics and Law degree is 50 places.

==== Master's degrees ====
TSE offers three master's degree tracks:

- an international track taught in English,
- a standard track taught in French and
- the doctoral track allowing the pursuit of a PhD at TSE.

===== International track =====
- Master's degree in Economics of Markets and Organizations (EMO)
- Master's degree in Econometrics and Empirical Economics (EEE)
- Master's degree in Public Policy and Development (PPD)
- Master's degree in Statistics and Econometrics
- Master's degree in Environmental and Natural Resources Economics (ERNA)
- Master's degree in Data Science for social sciences (D3S)
- Master's degree in Mathematics and Economic Decision (MED)
- Master's degree in Economics and Ecology (EE)
- Master's degree in Economics of Global Risks (EGR)

===== French track =====
- Master's degree in Applied Economics
- Master's degrees in Finance, in partnership with the Toulouse School of Management:
  - Corporate Finance
  - Financial Markets and Risk Evaluation
  - Finance and Information Technology
  - Master of Science in Finance
- Master's degree in Economics and Competition Law, in partnership with the Faculty of Law of Toulouse, leading to a double degree in Economics and Business Law.

==== Doctoral School ====
The doctoral program is composed of two years of doctoral courses starting with the master's degree in Economic Theory and Econometrics and continuing with a second year of advanced courses (research master's degree) in one of the following specialties:

- Behavioral and Experimental Economics
- Econometrics and Empirical Economics
- Economic Theory
- Finance
- Industrial Organization
- Macroeconomics
- Public Policy and Applied Economics

These two years of doctoral courses then lead to two to three years devoted to writing the PhD thesis, and then to the academic job market.

== Governance ==
In France, research units and universities are often separate entities, even if they reside in the same campus. TSE is composed of three entities: the TSE Ecole d'économie et de Sciences sociales quantitatives (EESSQ-TSE), the Jean-Jacques Laffont - TSE Foundation and the Unité mixte de recherche TSE-R.

The EESSQ is an independent grand établissement responsible for the undergraduate, master's, and PhD programs, as well as for joint research with the UMR TSE-R laboratory and the Jean-Jacques Laffont Foundation. Its governance structure includes a Board of Directors composed mostly of external members, some of whom are appointed by the Jean-Jacques Laffont Foundation.

The Jean-Jacques Laffont Foundation is a scientific cooperation foundation created in 2007 as part of a State tender for projects that oversees TSE's governance. The French scientific research institute (CNRS), the French research institute for agronomy (INRAE), and the School for Advanced Studies in the Social Sciences (EHESS), are among its public founders. Its Board members are mostly external, and its Scientific Council members are entirely external, to ensure governance is free of conflicts of interest. The Foundation steers TSE's overall strategy and provides resources (financial and human) thanks to the return on its capital, which is a result of two private fundraising campaigns. It manages two other foundations: TSE-P, which is responsible for TSE's partner-based research activities, and IAST, which is responsible for multi-disciplinary social sciences research activities.

The Unité mixte de recherche (UMR TSE-R) is a laboratory that hosts most of the TSE researchers and teacher-researchers in economics and mathematics. It is supervised by TSE, the CNRS, the INRAE, and the EHESS. The UMR has its own director, administrative staff, and Laboratory Council. The UMR structures research at TSE by dividing it into departments with a certain level of autonomy when it comes to research, human resource management, recruitment, and teaching activities in connection with the school.

The Scientific Council is the strategic steering body of the TSE Foundation. It is chaired by the Chairman (President) of the Foundation, who is currently Ariel Pakes, Professor at Harvard University. The members of the Scientific Council are:

- Roland Benabou (Princeton University)
- Marianne Bertrand (Chicago Booth School of Business)
- Pierre-Olivier Gourinchas (University of California, Berkeley)
- Rachel Griffith (The University of Manchester and Institute for Fiscal Studies)
- Luigi Guiso (Einaudi Institute for Economics and Finance)
- Bengt Holmström (MIT)
- Eliana La Ferrara (Bocconi University)
- Costas Meghir (Yale University)
- Aureo De Paula (UCL)
- Alessandro Pavan (Northwestern University)
- Antoinette Schoar (MIT)
- Guido Tabellini (Bocconi University)
- David Thesmar (MIT Sloan School of Management)
- Jaume Ventura (Barcelona School of Economics)
- Ekaterina Zhuravskaya (Paris School of Economics)

Previous members include:

- Philippe Aghion (INSEAD and Collège de France)
- Tim Besley (London School of Economics)
- Jean-Marc Robin (Sciences Po Paris)
- Thomas Sargent (New York University)
- David Thesmar (MIT)
- Susan Athey (Harvard University)
- Richard Blundell (University College London)
- François Bourguignon (Paris School of Economics)
- Mathias Dewatripont (Université Libre de Bruxelles)
- Ivar Ekeland (University of British Columbia)
- Armin Falk (University of Bonn)
- Drew Fudenberg (Harvard University)
- Bengt Holmström (Massachusetts Institute of Technology)
- Paul Joskow (Massachusetts Institute of Technology)
- Andreu Mas-Colell (Pompeu Fabra University)
- Eric Maskin (Princeton University)
- Roger Myerson (University of Chicago)
- Torsten Persson (Stockholm University)
- Rafael Repullo (CEMFI)
- Amartya Sen (Harvard University)
- Suzanne Scotchmer (University of California)
- Nicholas Stern (HM Treasury)

== Notable alumni ==
- Philippe Crébassa, French public servant.
- Éloïc Peyrache, French economist
- Ahmat Jidoud, Nigerien economist and former politician
