= Charles Annibal Fabrot =

French lawyer (1580–1659)

Charles Annibal Fabrot (15 September 1580 – 16 January 1659) was a French jurisconsult.

== Biography ==
He was born in Aix-en-Provence. At an early age he made great progress in the ancient languages and in the civil and the Canon law, and in 1602 he received the degree of doctor of law, and was made avocat to the parlement of Aix. In 1609 he obtained a professorship in the university of his native town. He is best known by his translation of the Basilika, which may be said to have formed the code of the Eastern empire till its destruction.

This work was published at Paris in 1647 in 7 volumes folio, and obtained for its author a considerable pension from the chancellor, Pierre Seguier, to whom it was dedicated. Fabrot rendered great service to the science of jurisprudence by his edition of Cujas, which comprised several treatises of that great jurist previously unpublished. He also edited the works of several Byzantine historians, and was besides the author of various antiquarian and legal treatises. He died in Paris on 16 January 1659.

== Trivia ==
- There is a street in the centre of Aix-en-Provence named after him.
