= Marlène Dolveck =

French businesswoman

- Born: September 14, 1975 (age 50); L'Union, France
- Education: Toulouse Capitole University, EDHEC Business School
- Occupation: Businesswoman
- Board member of: CMA CGM

Marlène Dolveck (born September 14, 1975) is a French businesswoman who is Executive Vice President at CMA CGM. She worked previously as CEO of SNCF Gares & Connexions and Deputy CEO of SNCF.

== Biography ==
=== Education and personal life ===
Marlène Dolveck's father was a locomotive driver at SNCF and her mother a florist.

In 1997, Marlène Dolveck earned a degree in Economic Engineering from the Toulouse Capitole University. She resumed her studies in 2006, first completing a specialized master's degree in banking management at the École Supérieure de la Banque. She holds an Executive MBA from EDHEC Business School.

Following a divorce, she remarried François Dolveck, an emergency physician and Director of the SAMU (emergency medical services) in Seine-et-Marne. She is the mother of four children.

=== Career ===
From 1997 to 2001, she taught economics and social sciences at Saint-Jean de Béthune and Le Bon Sauveur high schools in Versailles.

From 2001 to 2007, she held operational roles in wealth management at Crédit Agricole and La Banque Postale. She later held various senior management positions within La Banque Postale. Eventually noticed by Philippe Wahl, she was appointed Head of Wealth Management at La Banque Postale, a position she held until 2017.

From 2017 to 2019, she led the Omnichannel Banking Division for Personal Banking and Wealth Management at HSBC France, where she also joined the Executive Committee.

In January 2020, she joined SNCF as CEO of SNCF Gares & Connexions, a subsidiary of the SNCF. Her appointment coincided with the pension reform strikes and the onset of the COVID-19 crisis. She was a member of the Presidents’ Committee and the Executive Committee of the SNCF Group. She also served as Chair of the Supervisory Board of AREP. In January 2024, she was appointed Deputy CEO of the SNCF. She has dealt with the cost overruns in the renovation of Paris Gare du Nord train station. She filed a lawsuit against Ceetrus, SNCF’s partner in the project, and won a first-instance ruling in September 2023.

=== Recent career ===
In June 2025, she was appointed Executive Vice President, in charge of IT, Digital Transformation and Artificial Intelligence, Cybersecurity and Group R&D at CMA CGM. In this role, she oversees information technology, digital transformation, artificial intelligence, cybersecurity, and research and development.

=== Honours and awards ===
- Knight of the Legion of Honour (2022)
- Named one of Forbes magazine's "40 Exceptional Women" in 2023
