= Philippe Malaurie =

French jurist (1925–2020)

- Born: 7 March 1925; Mainz, Germany
- Died: 1 April 2020 (aged 95)
- Occupation: Professor of Law

Philippe Malaurie (7 March 1925 – 1 April 2020) was a French professor of private law.

== Life ==
Philippe Malaurie was born on 7 March 1925 in Mainz, occupied by French forces. He became a Doctor of Law at the Paris Faculty of Law in 1951. His thesis was on L'order public et le contrat; étude de droit comparé. He passed his agrégation in Law in 1951. He taught at the Institut des hautes études in Tunis from 1951 to 1955, at the Faculty of Law in Poitiers from 1955 to 1966, and at the Faculty of Law of Paris from 1966 to 1970, then taught at the University of Paris II. He was dean of the Faculty of Law of Nanterre from 1968 to 1969. He was vice-president of the French Committee of International Private Law in 1976. In 2003 he became a professor of Law, Economics and Social Sciences at the Paris II University. In 2017, Malaurie was Professor Emeritus of Private Law at the Panthéon-Assas University.

== Publications ==
- Philippe Malaurie (1996), La revente, LexisNexis
- Philippe Malaurie; Antoine Garapon; Paul Ricœur; Patrick Valdrini (1998), Le crime contre l'humanité : mesure de la responsabilité, Parole et silence
- Philippe Malaurie (1998), Droit et littérature (Anthology), Cujas
- Philippe Malaurie (2000), Anthologie de la pensée juridique (Second edition in 2001 ed.), Cujas
- Richard Crône; Marie-Cécile Forgeard; Bertrand Gelot (2007), Le nouveau droit des successions et des libéralités - Loi du 23 juin 2006, commentaires et formules, preface by Philippe Malaurie, Defrénois
- Philippe Malaurie; Yves Fulchiron (2009), L'évolution du droit français de la famille, Defrénois
- Philippe Malaurie; Laurent Aynès (2010), Les successions. Les libéralités (4 ed.), Defrénois
- Philippe Malaurie; Laurent Aynès (2010), Les régimes matrimoniaux (3 ed.), Defrénois
- Philippe Malaurie (2010), Les personnes. La protection des mineurs et des majeurs (5 ed.), Defrénois
- Philippe Malaurie; Laurent Aynès (2010), Les biens (4 ed.), Defrénois
- Philippe Malaurie; Hugues Fulchiron (2011), La famille (4 ed.), Defrénois
- Philippe Malaurie; Laurent Aynès; Pierre-Yves Gautier (2011), Les contrats spéciaux (5 ed.), Defrénois
- Philippe Malaurie; Laurent Aynès; Pierre Crocq (2011), Les sûretés, la publicité foncière (5 ed.), Defrénois
- Philippe Malaurie; Laurent Aynès; Philippe Stoffel-Munck (2011), Les obligations (5 ed.), Defrénois
- Philippe Malaurie; Philippe Delestre (2011), Droit civil illustré, Defrénois
- Catherine Puigelier (2011), La reconnaissance, postscript by Philippe Malaurie, Bruylant
- Philippe Malaurie; Laurent Aynès; Philippe Stoffel-Munck (2013), Les obligations (6 ed.), Defrénois
- Philippe Malaurie (2013), Dictionnaire d'un droit humaniste, LGDJ

== Sources ==
- General course on private international law (in French), Martinus Nijhoff Publishers, 1979-11-05, ISBN 90-286-0759-5
- Malaurie, Philippe (1925-....) (in French), BnF: Bibliotheque nationale de France
- M. Philippe Malaurie (in French), Université Paris II, archived from the original on 2017-10-15
