= Léon Duguit =

French scholar of public law (1859–1928)

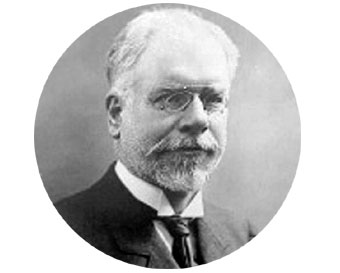
Léon Duguit

Léon Duguit (1859–1928) was a leading French scholar of public law (droit public). After a stint at Caen from 1882 to 1886, he was appointed to a chair of constitutional law at the University of Bordeaux in 1892, where one of his colleagues was Émile Durkheim.

Duguit's novel objectivist theory of public law, developed in amicable rivalry with his colleague Maurice Hauriou of Toulouse, was to have a lasting effect on the development of these parts of law. In Duguit's opinion, the state was not a mythical Sovereign inherently superior to all its subjects, or even a particularly powerful legal person, but merely a group of people engaged in public service, the activity constituting and legitimising the state. Although critical of notions such as sovereignty, democracy, legal personhood and even property to the extent it is not legitimised by a social purpose, he distinguished himself from Marxists by emphasizing the function of the economy for the development of the state.

== Works ==
- L'État, le droit objectif et la loi positive. Extracted as "Theory of Objective Law Anterior to the State" in Modern French Legal Philosophy, trans. Mrs Franklin W. Scott and Joseph P. Chamberlain (New York, Kelly, 1916; South Hackensack NJ, Rothman, 1968), pp. 235–344
- L'État les gouvernants et les agents
- Souveraineté et liberté
- Les transformations du droit public
- Traité de droit constitutionnel
- "The Law and the State". Harvard Law Review. 31: 1. 1917. doi:10.2307/1327671. JSTOR 1327671.
- Law in the Modern State. Translated by Frida and Harold Laski. London: Allen & Unwin. 1922.
- "Objective Law". Columbia Law Review. 20: 817. 1920. doi:10.2307/1111263. JSTOR 1111263. "Objective Law II, III and IV". Columbia Law Review. 21: 17, 126 and 242. 1921. doi:10.2307/1111515. JSTOR 1111515. Translated by Margaret Grandgent and Ralph W. Gifford.

== Bibliography ==
- Jones, H. S. (1993). The French State in Question: public law and political argument in the Third Republic. Cambridge: Cambridge U.P. ISBN 978-0521431491.
- Motte, Olivier J. (2001). "Duguit, Léon". In Michael Stolleis (ed.). Juristen: ein biographisches Lexikon; von der Antike bis zum 20. Jahrhundert (in German) (2nd ed.). München: Beck. ISBN 3-406-45957-9.
