= Hugues Kenfack =

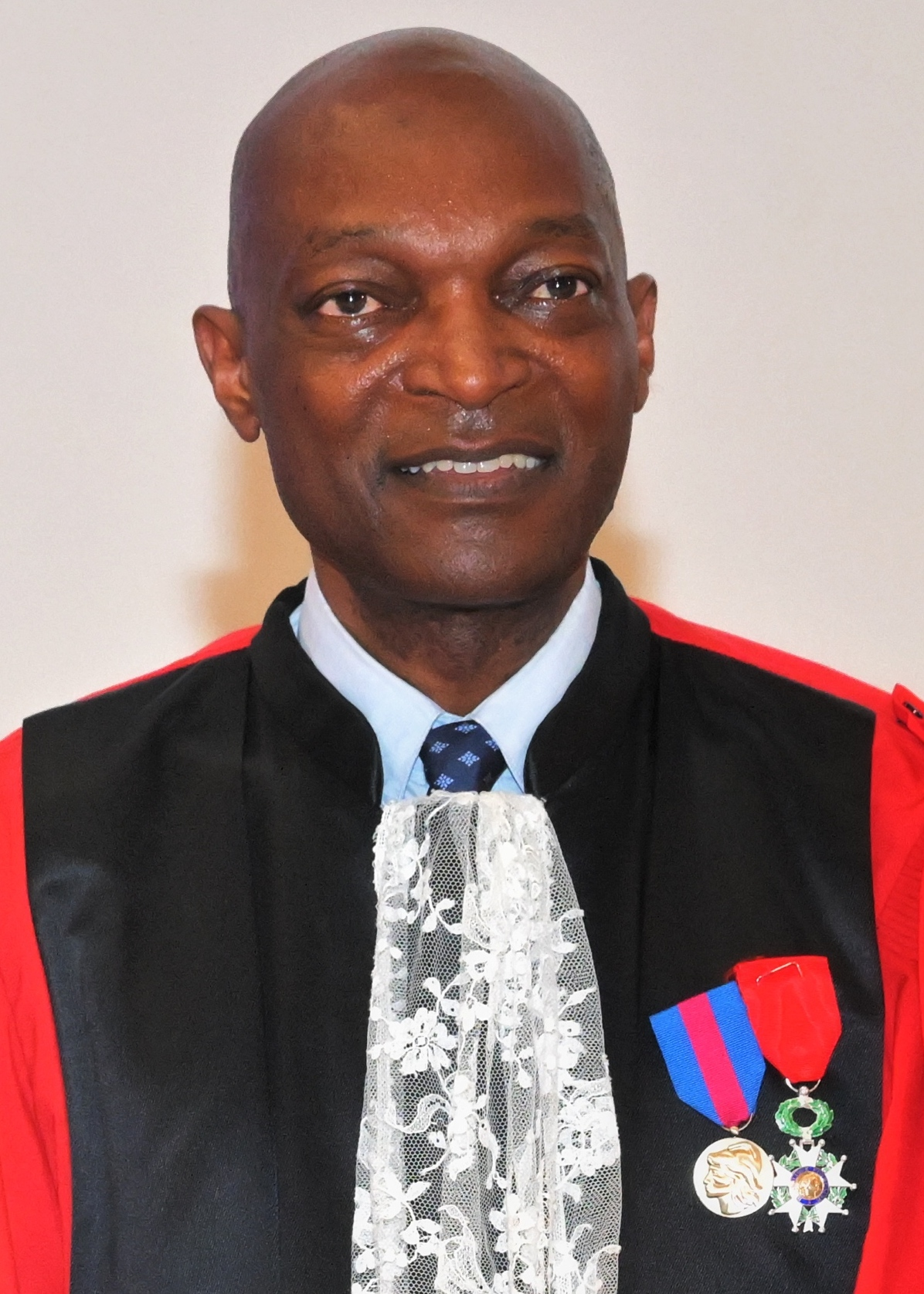
- Hugues Kenfack in 2023
- Born: August 29, 1967 (age 59); Yaoundé, Cameroun
- Occupations: President of the University Toulouse Capitale, Professor of Law
- Known for: Chevalier of the Legion of Honour; Officier de l'Ordre des Palmes académiques

Hugues Kenfack, full professor of law, was elected president of the French Toulouse Capitole University in 2020. His areas of expertise include contract law, commercial law, international trade law, arbitration, and mediation. Originally from the Foto region of West Cameroun, he holds a doctoral degree with honors, titled La franchise internationale (1996).

== Career ==
Initially Associate professor at the Universities of Toulouse Toulouse Capitole and the University of Toulouse-Jean Jaurès (1997–2001), he was then Agrégé des Facultés of law at the University of Poitiers (2001–2004), before returning to the University of Toulouse I Capitole as University Professor (since 2004).

Since 2005, Hugues Kenfack has been co-director of the Master in International Law, as well as director of the Master in International Business Law at Toulouse Capitole University.

Under the presidency of Bruno Sire (2008–2016), he was first vice-president of Toulouse I Capitole University, in charge of the scientific advisory board (2007–2012), then dean of the Faculty of Law and Political Science at Toulouse I Capitole University (2012–2017) and finally vice-president of the Conference of Law Faculty Deans, in charge of academic programs (2014–2017).

He has been invited as guest lecturer at universities worldwide, including Saint Louis University School of Law (USA), Renmin University of China (China), Beijing Normal University (China), and the Universities of Douala, Yaoundé, and Dschang (Cameroon). He is Chevalier of the French Legion of Honor (2017) and Officer of the French Palmes académiques (2015).

Hugues Kenfack provides expert opinions for a number of organizations, including the Council of Europe and the European Union, for a call for tenders to improve commercial justice in Tunisia (2019), the Agence Universitaire de la Francophonie, and the United Nations on international trade law (2018). He is a member and former president of the jury for the CAPA (Certificat d'aptitude à la profession d'avocat) Sud-Ouest Pyrénées and the notary entrance exam in Toulouse (since 2010).

== Publications ==
Hugues Kenfack is the author of several books in French on these subjects, including Droit commercial (5th ed., Lefebvre-Dalloz, 2023) and Droit du commerce international (8th ed., Lefebvre Dalloz, 2023). He is responsible for the "Droit des Transports" column in the Recueil Dalloz and the "Baux commerciaux" column in the Revue de jurisprudence commerciale, as well as co-responsible for the Baux commerciaux column in the business and notarial editions of the Semaine Juridique (JCP).

- Kenfack, Hugues (2021) Bref retour sur le renouveau de l'article 1722 du code civil relatif à la perte de la chose louée. In : Liber amicorum en l'honneur du Professeur Didier Ferrier LexisNexis / Dalloz. p. 343. ISBN 978-2-7110-3608-0
- Kenfack, Hugues (2021) L'architecture des obligations du vendeur. In : Les recodifications du droit de la vente en Europe Presses universitaires juridiques - Université de Poitiers. Series "Collection Actes et colloques de la Faculté de droit et des sciences sociales, Université de Poitiers", p. 445. ISBN 978-2-38194-004-5
- Kenfack, Hugues & Dumont-Lefrand, Marie-Pierre (2020) Droit et pratique des baux commerciaux.
- Kenfack, Hugues (2019) Droit du commerce international,7e édition. Collection « Les mémentos Dalloz. Série Droit privé ». Dalloz ISBN 978-2-247-18928-1

== Awards ==
- Chevalier des Palmes académiques (2010), Officier des Palmes académiques (2015)
- Chevalier of the Legion of Honour (2017)
