= Toulouse School of Management =

Coordinates: 43.606532°N 1.438780°E

- Institut d’administrations des entreprises de Toulouse
- Former name: IAE Toulouse
- Type: Public research university Business school
- Established: 1955; 71 years ago
- Parent institution: Toulouse 1 University Capitole
- Accreditation: EFMD programs: Master in International Management; Master in Finance; Doctoral Programme
- Affiliations: IAE network
- President: Julien Grobert
- Faculty: 70 professors & researchers
- Students: 3,000; 20% international
- Location: Toulouse, France
- Campus: Toulouse 1 Capitole University, 2, rue du doyen Gabriel Marty, 31042 Toulouse Cedex 9
- Language: English-only & French-only instruction
- Website: http://tsm-education.fr/en
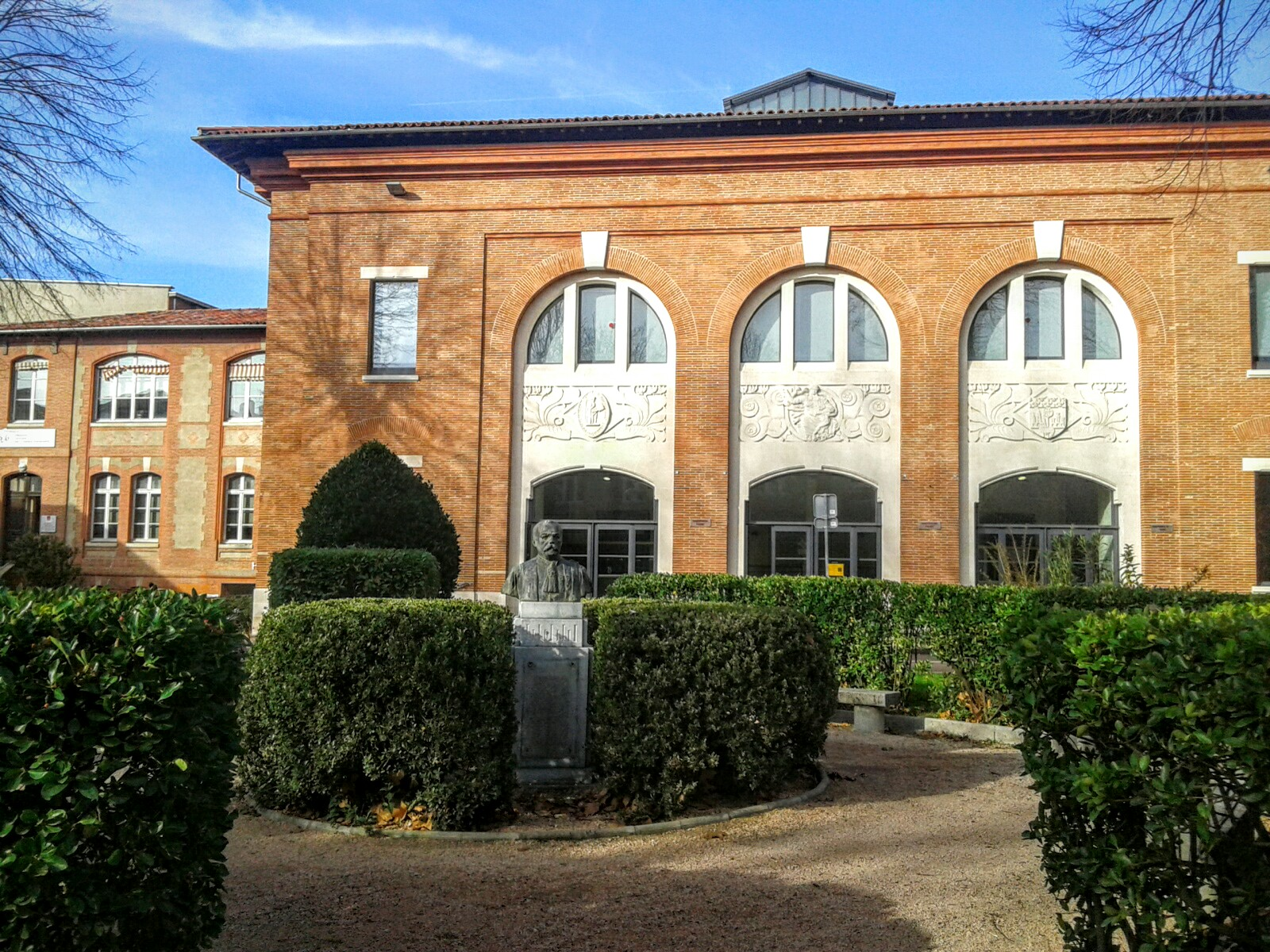

Toulouse School of Management

Toulouse School of Management is a public school of management and a constituent part of Toulouse Capitole University. The institution offers more than 20 bachelor’s, master’s and doctoral-level degrees in management, delivered through full-time, work-study and continuing education programmes, covering the main disciplines of management.

Located in the heart of the city of Toulouse, the School has 3,000 students, 100 faculty members and researchers, as well as 430 adjunct faculty. Toulouse School of Management is a member of the IAE France network.

== History ==
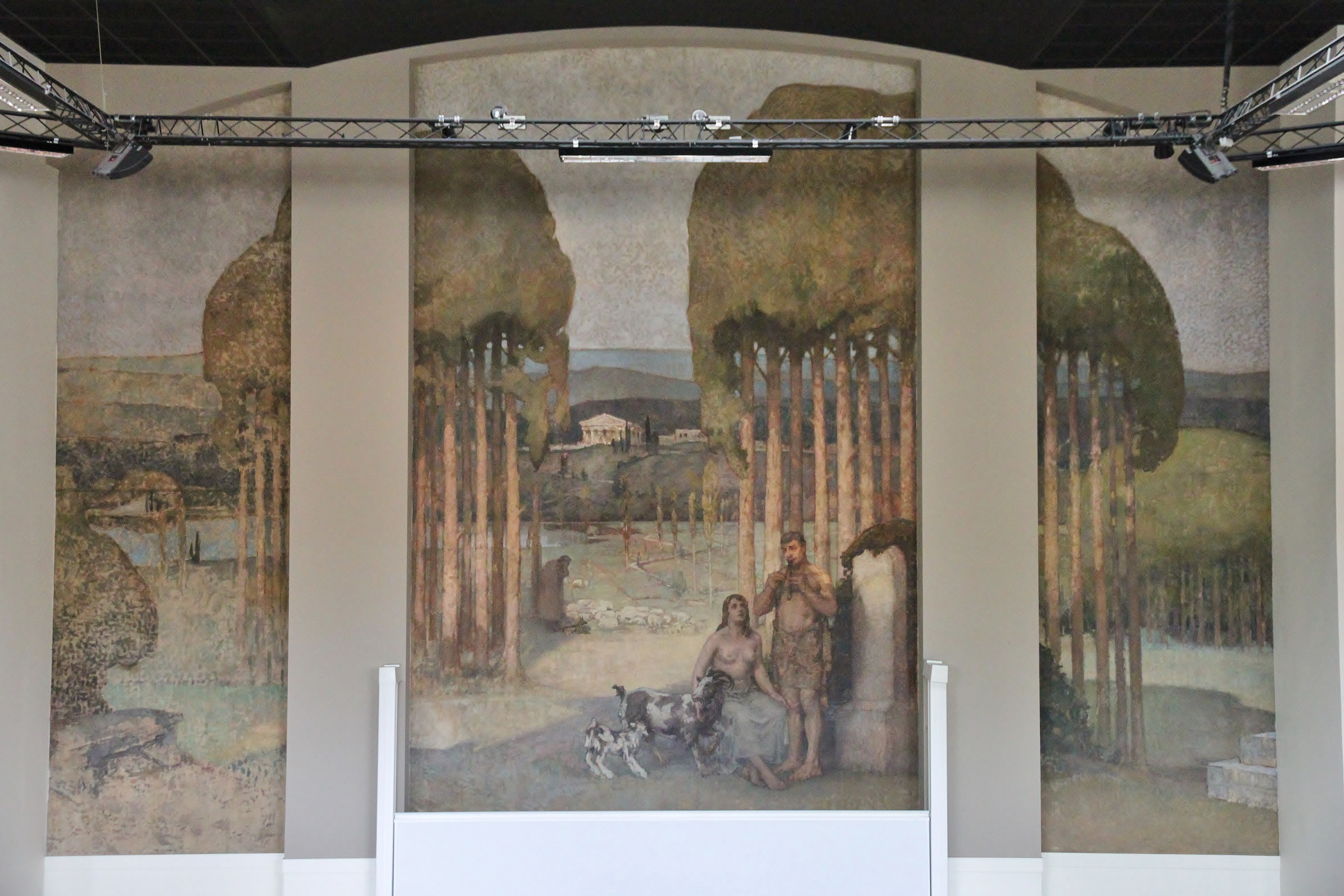
Classroom Amphitheater Cujas

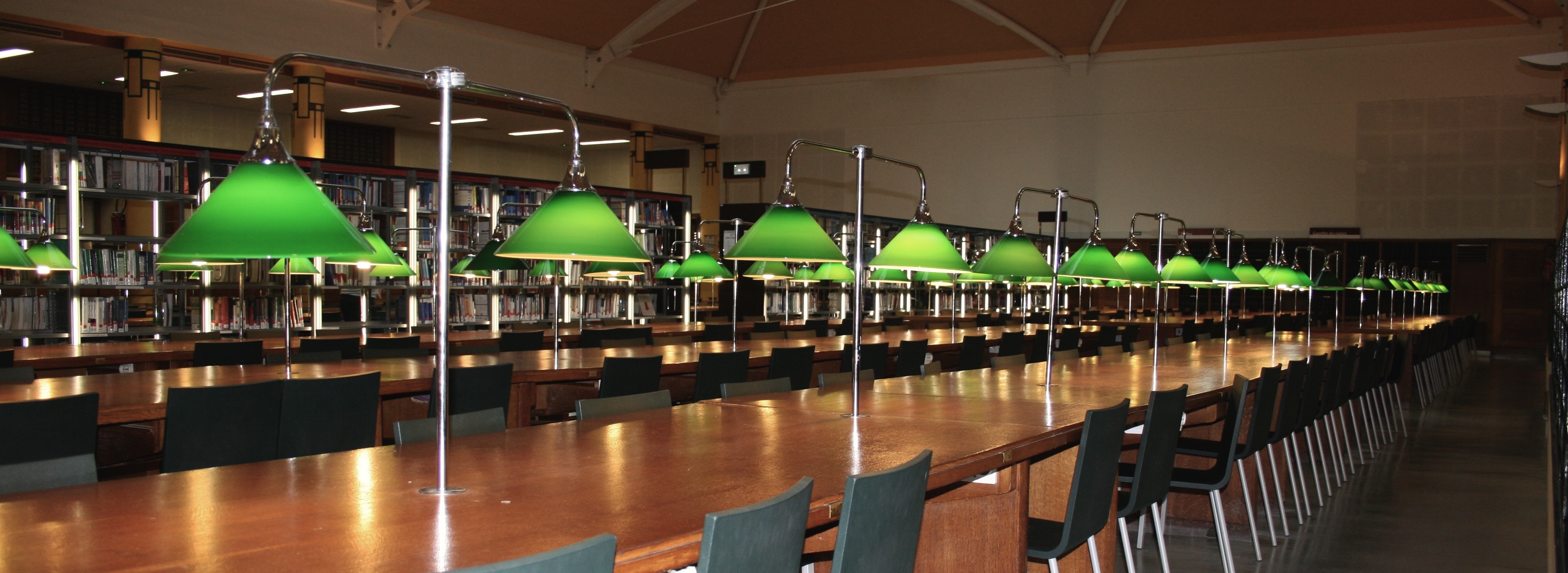
Main Library (principale bibliothèque)

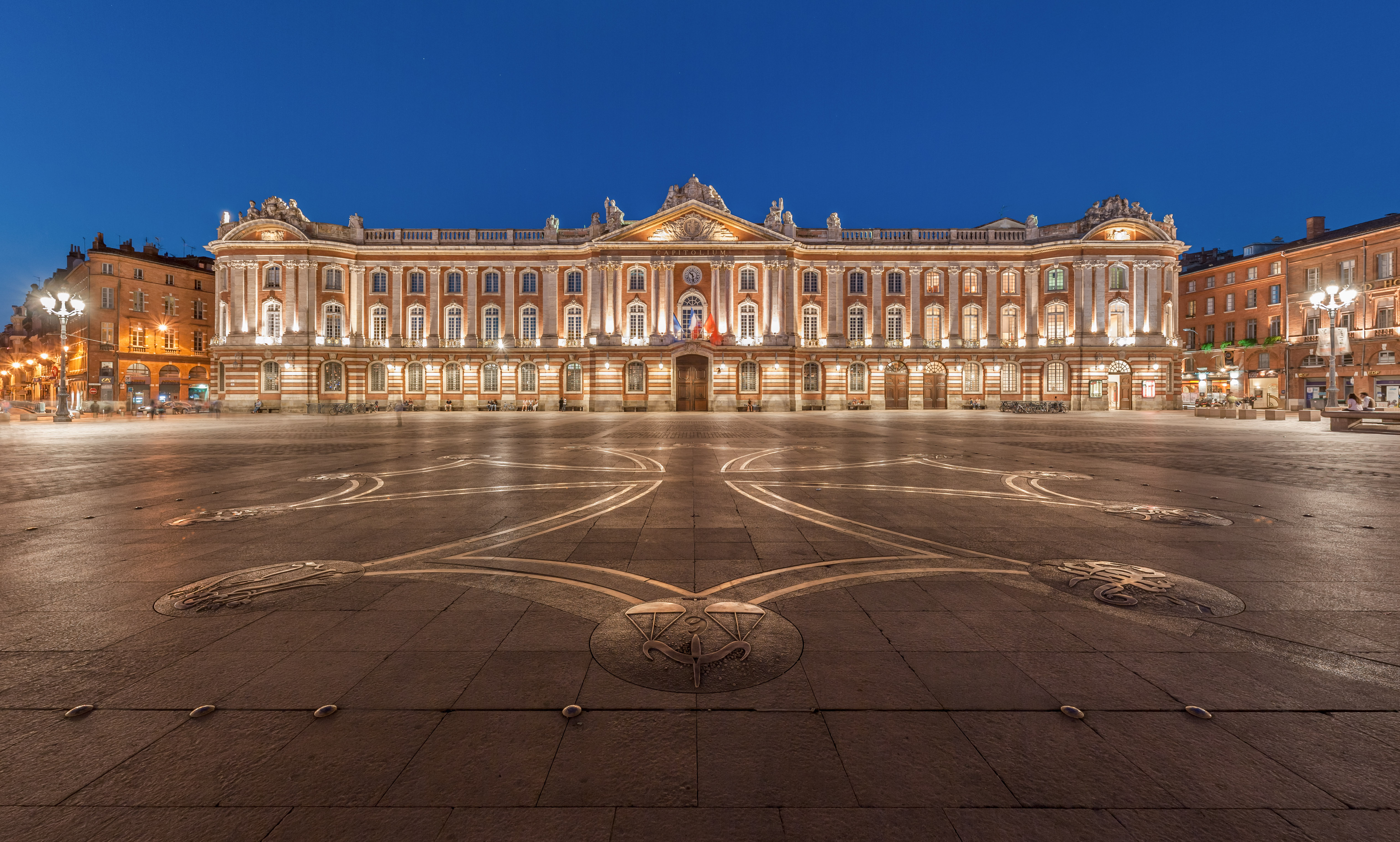
Toulouse Capitole at night

The Institut de Préparation aux Affaires was founded in 1955 and was established in the buildings of the former Faculty of Law, Medicine and Arts in Toulouse, on Rue Lautmann. Its primary mission was to train engineers and business executives in modern management techniques through a qualification known as the Certificat d’Aptitude à l’Administration des Entreprises (CAAE).

In the 1970s, the IPA became the Institut d’Administration des Entreprises (IAE Toulouse). Its main missions were:

- to provide students with training for administrative functions in companies, as well as for senior commercial and accounting careers;
- to contribute to the professional development of company executives;
- and to develop links between the university and the business community, particularly in order to foster scientific research in the economic and social fields.

In October 2017, IAE Toulouse changed its name and became Toulouse School of Management.

== School Timeline ==
- 1955: Creation of the Institute of Business Preparation within the Faculty of Law and launch of an executive management programme for engineers and senior managers (the Certificate of Competence in Business Administration).
- 1958: Creation of the Advanced Training Cycle, the first steps towards continuing education for senior executives and business leaders.
- 1981: Establishment of the Institute of Economic and Accounting Techniques alongside the Faculty of Law, and the introduction of degrees in Accounting, Finance and Management.
- 1985: Founding of the Institute of Business Administration of Toulouse as a faculty with a special status (Article 713-9 of the French Education Code).
- 1988: Launch of the doctoral programme in management, in collaboration with the Faculty of Law and the School of Economics (today Toulouse School of Economics – TSE).
- 1995: IAE Toulouse introduces work-study programmes with partner institutions.
- 1999: The IAE research team joins the Interdisciplinary Laboratory for Research in Management, Economics and Law (LIRHE).
- 2004: Implementation of the Bologna Agreements and creation of Bachelor’s and Master’s programmes in the main management disciplines: Accounting and Control, Finance, Human Resource Management, Marketing and Strategy.
- 2006: Establishment of the Doctoral School in Management Sciences.
- 2008: EPAS accreditation awarded for the Master in International Management.
- 2009: Transformation of the LIRHE and creation of the Centre for Management Research (CRM), the future TSM-Research.
- 2011: CNRS accreditation of the Centre for Management Research.
- 2017: Name change: IAE Toulouse becomes Toulouse School of Management – TSM; the CRM becomes TSM-Research; and the Doctoral School in Management Sciences becomes TSM Doctoral Programme.
- 2020: EFMD accreditation for the Doctoral Programme and the Master in Finance.
- 2023: EQUIS accreditation obtained by TSM.
- 2024: The Master in Finance enters the Financial Times ranking for the first time. Nationally, it is the top-ranked Master in Finance in the public sector.
- 2025: TSM celebrates its 70th anniversary.

== International Relations ==
The institution has an international focus, with over 100 partner universities worldwide, 10 double-degree programmes delivered in English, and 18% international students.

Several programmes have received the European EFMD label, which certifies the relevance and high quality of the best internationally-oriented programmes.

== Research ==
TSM offers a doctoral programme in management sciences. Its research laboratory, TSM Research, is a joint research unit (UMR CNRS 5303).

== Notable alumni ==
- Antoine Dupont
- Vincent Clerc
- Coco Lindelauf
- Marie Perrier
