= Toulouse Capitole University =

University in Toulouse, France

Coordinates: 43°36′23″N 1°26′12″E

- Université Toulouse Capitole
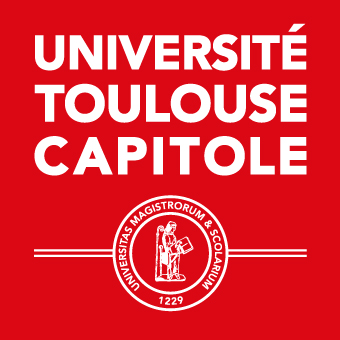
- Motto: Universitas Magistrorum et Scolarium (Latin)
- Type: Public research university
- Established: 1229; 797 years ago Université Toulouse; Re-established as Université Toulouse 1 in 1970
- Founder: King Saint Louis
- Affiliations: Federal University of Toulouse Midi-Pyrénées; Toulouse University System
- Budget: €150 million (2024)
- Chancellor: Hugues Kenfack
- Academic staff: 679 lecturers-researchers
- Administrative staff: 581
- Students: 22,400; 15.3% international
- Location: Toulouse, France
- Campus: France: Toulouse city center; Montauban; Rodez; Vietnam, Morocco and Vanuatu
- Language: English-only & French-only instruction
- Website: www.ut-capitole.fr

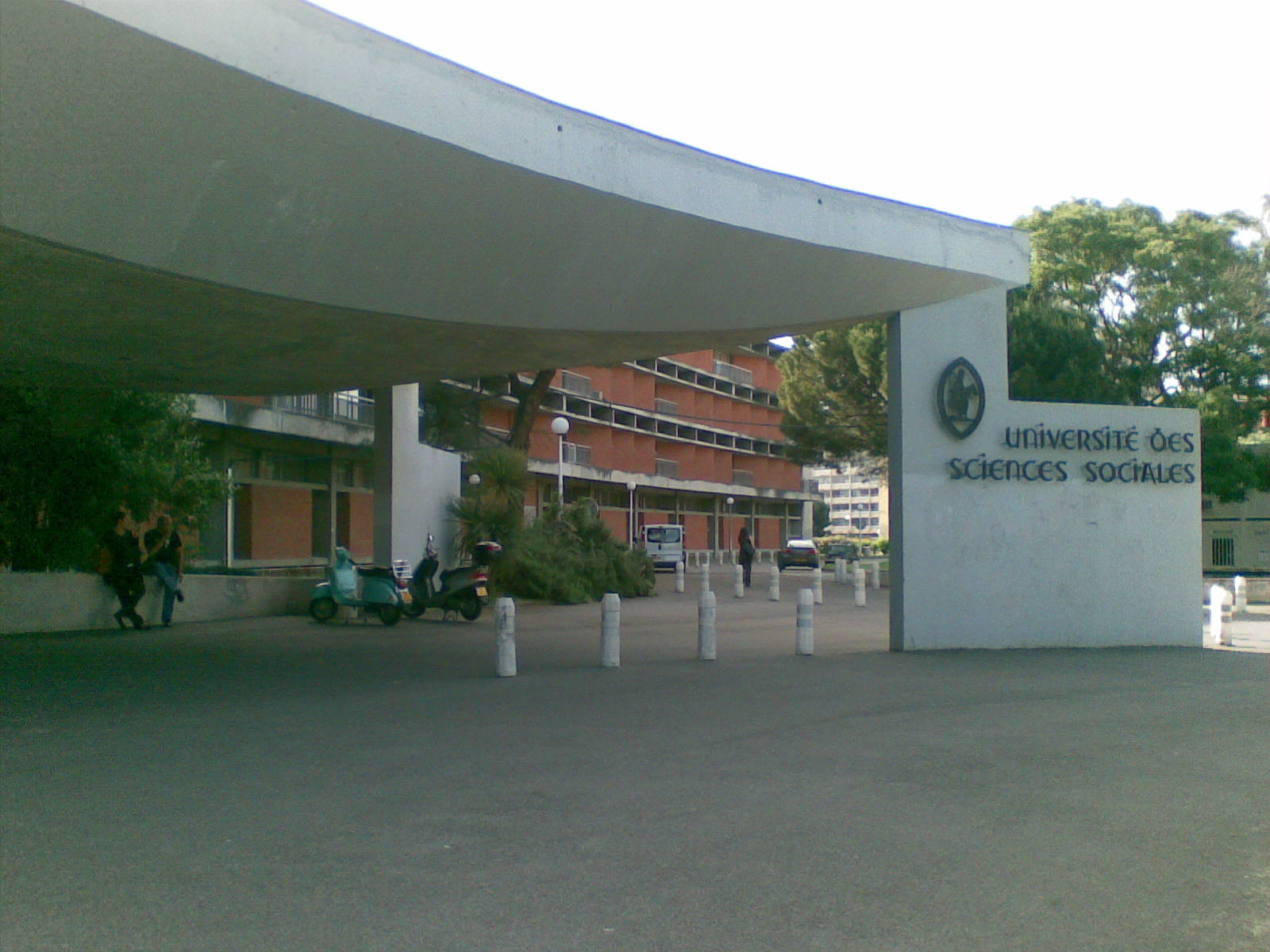
Main Entrance to the Arsenal

Toulouse Capitole University, (Note: (French: Université Toulouse Capitole, pronounced [ynivɛʁsite tuluz kapitɔl]; Occitan: Universitat Capitol de Tolosa)) also known as Toulouse 1, is a public university in Toulouse, France. It is one of the three universities of the city of Toulouse, in southwestern France. The university, presided by Hugues Kenfack, focuses on social sciences, law, political science, economics and administration. On January 1, 2023, the University Capitole University became an experimental public institution, regrouping the "component institutions" of the Toulouse School of Economics and the Sciences Po Toulouse, the "components" Toulouse School of Law, the Toulouse School of Management, the University Institutes of Technology (IUT) of Rodez, the Faculty of Computer Science (Informatique), and the Faculty of Administration and Communication.

== History ==
Toulouse Capitole University is one of the several so-called 'successor' institutions of the Université de Toulouse (1229–1969), which was the second university created in France in 1229 after the Sorbonne was founded (around the year 1200). The university originally included four faculties: theology, canon law, civil law and arts (grammar). The medical school was created in 1257. The university was closed in 1793 as the French Revolution abolished royal universities.

At the end of the Second Empire, the first four faculties co-existed, but the most important was the law school, which contained three-quarters of the students and the most renowned teachers. However, the Faculties of Toulouse suffered due to underfunding of French higher education in the provinces. At the same time, freedom of higher education was proclaimed in France, leading to the founding in 1877 of the Catholic University of Toulouse, a private not-for-profit institution recognised as being in the public interest. In the 1880s Luis Liard and Ernest Lavisse gave enough autonomy to the faculties so the municipality could help those State Faculties, which were named the University of Toulouse in 1896.

Yet the Edgar Faure acts divided the University of Toulouse into three establishments:

- Toulouse 1 University of Social Sciences (Law, Economy and Management); now known as Toulouse Capitole University.
- Toulouse 2 University of Literature and Human Sciences;
- Toulouse 3 University Paul Sabatier of Sciences and Health.

Only the Toulouse Capitole University remains on the historical site of the town center. In September 2009, the Toulouse 1 University of Social Sciences became the Toulouse 1 Capitole University.

== Academics ==
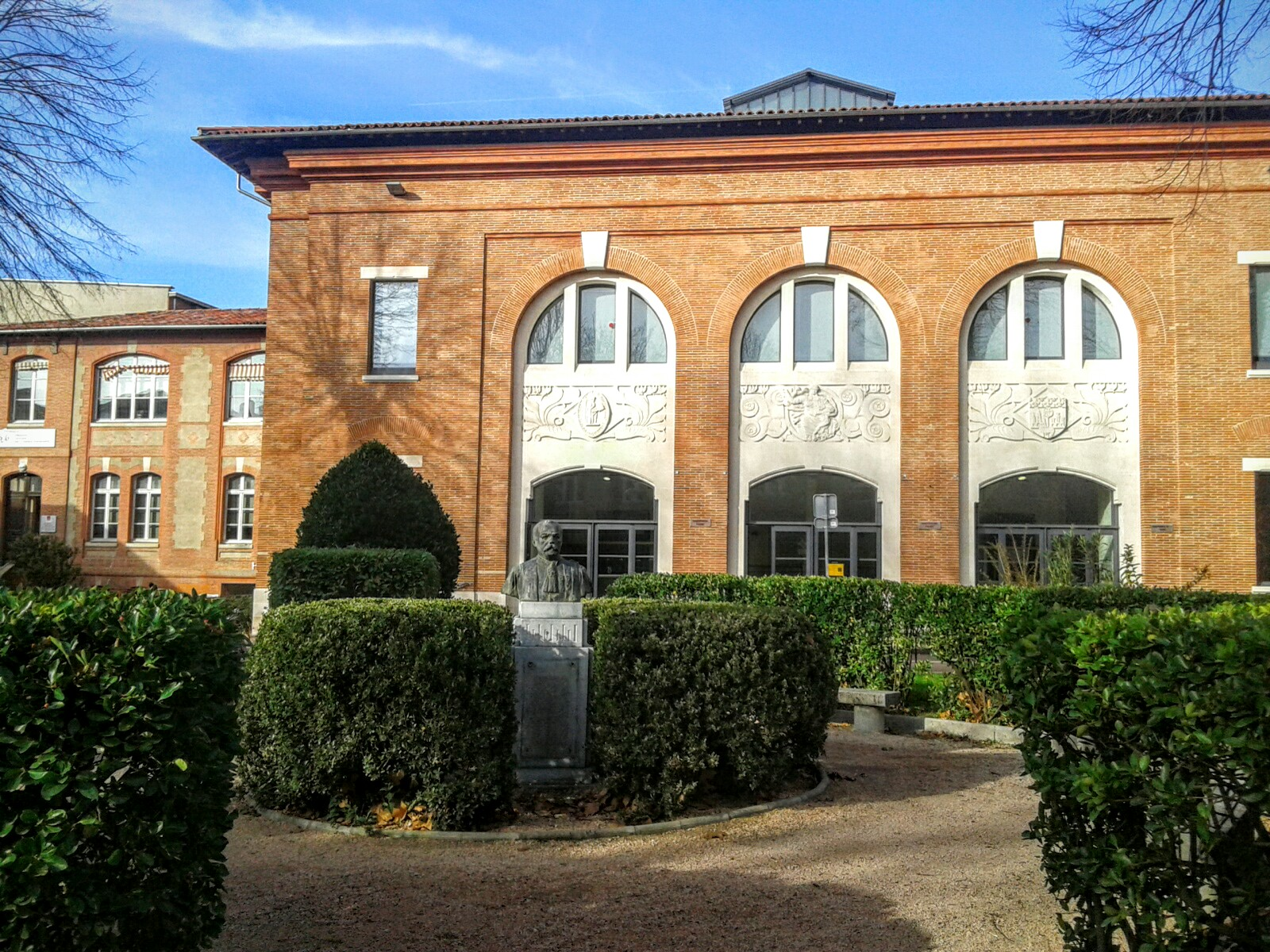
Amphitheater Cujas

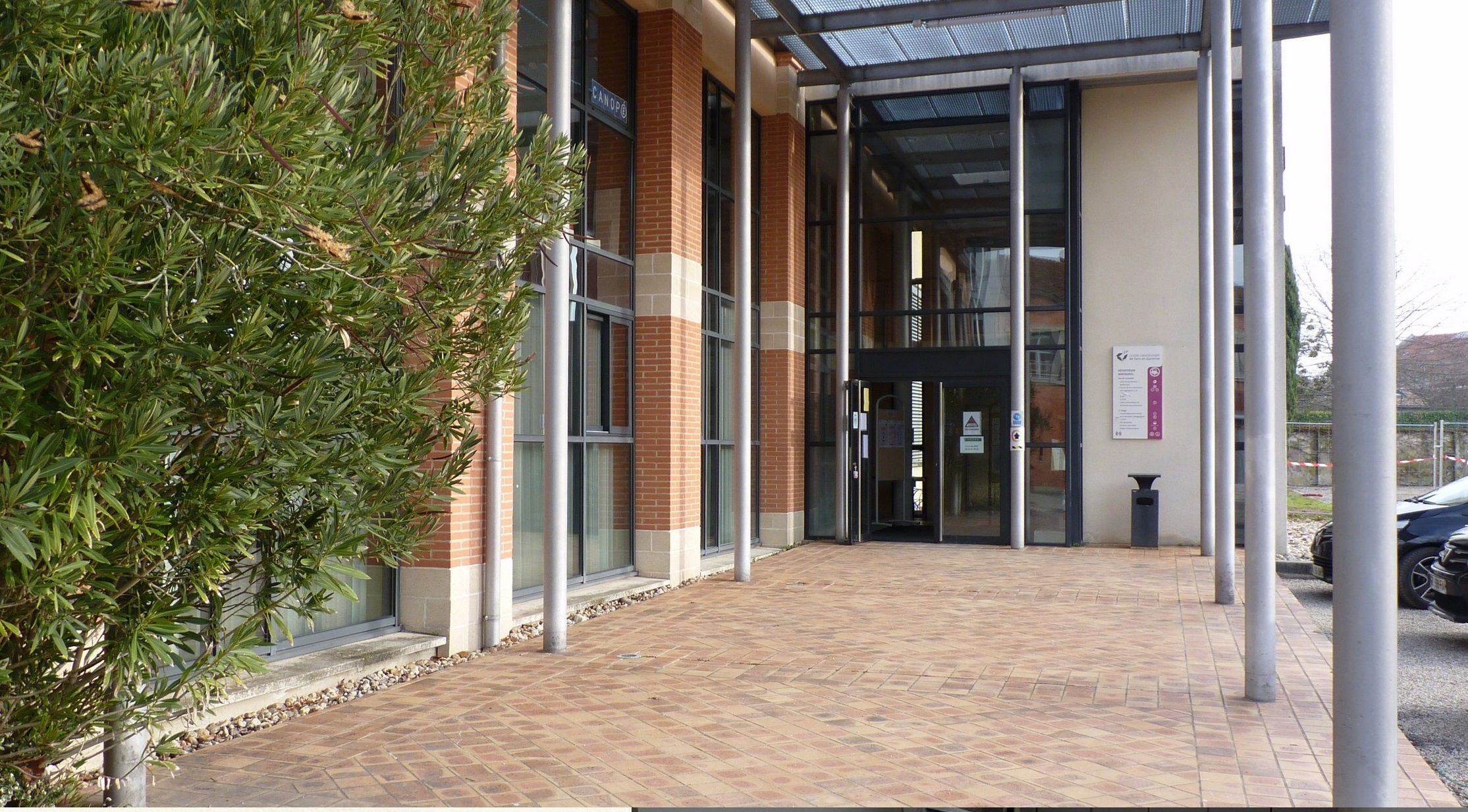
Médiathèque Montauriol Photo Façade à Montauban, Université Toulouse 1 Capitole, France

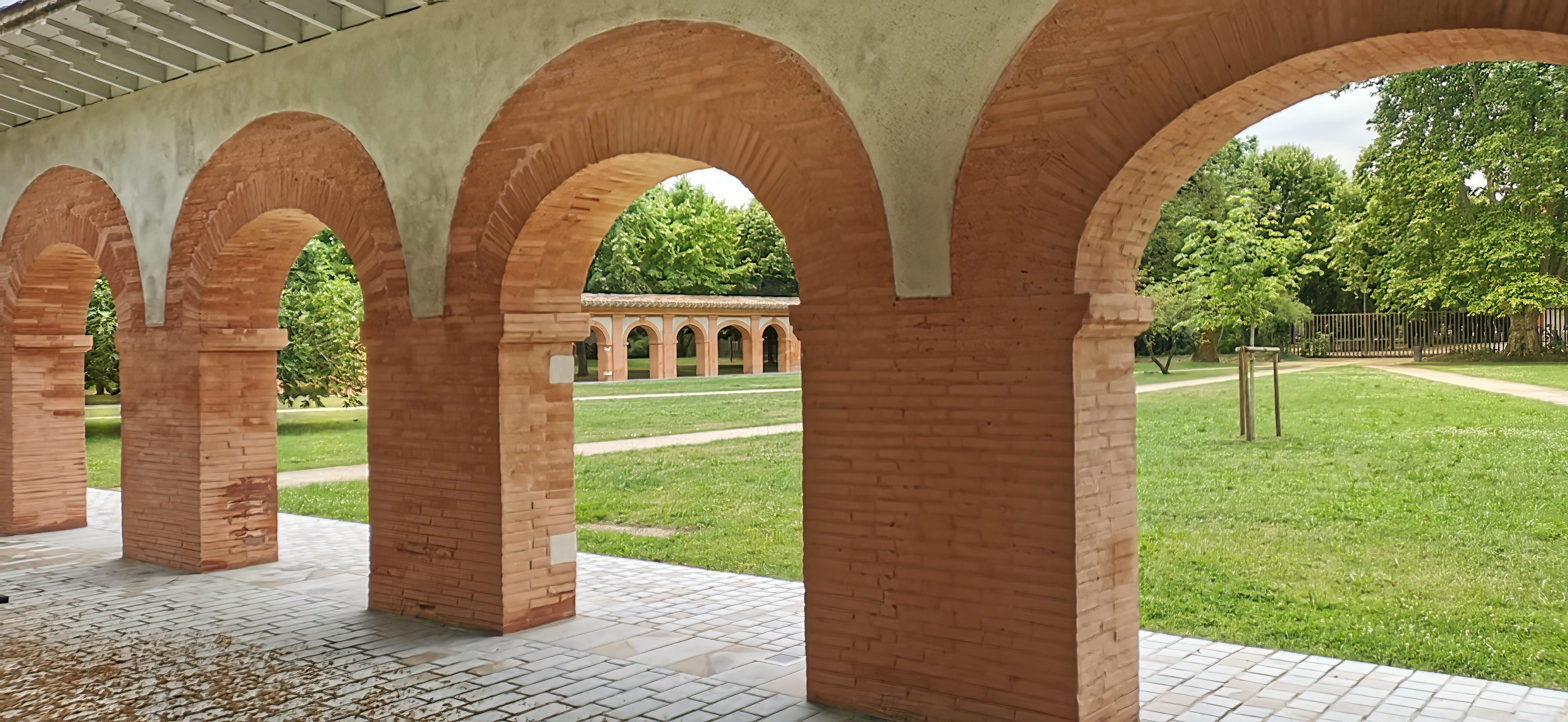
Cloister Saint-Pierre des Chartreux

Toulouse Capitole University educates more than 20,000 students every year, over 15% of which are international students. Students may enroll in a Bachelors program directly after obtaining a Baccalauréat, or the equivalent high school diploma for international students. Unlike the French Grandes écoles, public university education is open enrollment, tuition is often more affordable, and registration does not require attendance at a post-high school preparatory school (French: prépa or Classe préparatoire aux grandes écoles). Degrees from French universities are recognized world-wide and awarded by the Ministry of National Education (France) (French: Le Ministère de L'éducation Nationale).

Since 2020, the University of Toulouse I Capitole is a member of the European University Engage.eu which aims to provide citizens and students with the necessary skills to meet the major societal challenges already underway (migration, aging population, digital transformation...). The aim of this project is to pool the skills and expertise of the different partners in order to provide high quality education, common curricula and increased student mobility, as well as a European research network. The consortium of this project is composed of six other universities: University of Mannheim (Germany), Luiss Guido Carli (Italy), NHH Norwegian School of Economics (Norway), Tilburg University (Netherlands), University of National and World Economy (Bulgaria), and Vienna University of Economics and Business (Austria).

The institution's academic priorities focus on three areas: international degrees, double-language degrees, and degrees with a high potential for professional integration. The different academic disciplines of UT1 are:

== Component institutions, Components and Departments ==
=== Component institutions ===
- Toulouse School of Economics (TSE)
- Sciences Po Toulouse

=== Components ===
- Toulouse School of Law
- Toulouse School of Management (TSM)
- University Institutes of Technology (IUT) of Rodez
- Faculty of Computer Science (Informatique)
- Faculty of Administration and Communication

=== Departments ===
- Physical and Sports Activities (DAPS)
- Mathematics
- Department of Languages and Cultures (DLC)

=== Instruction in English ===
The university offers a number of degree programs in management, economic, law, and technology taught in English-only. Higher education degrees in France are organized into three levels thus facilitating international mobility: the Licence / Bachelor's, Master's, and Doctorate degrees. A Bachelor's degree requires the completion of 180 ECTS credits; a Master's, requires an additional 120 ECTS credits. In 2022, annual tuition for a bachelor's degree taught in English-only was: €262 (US$296) for students from anywhere in the world.

- Global Management (Bachelors)
- International Management (Master's)
- Finance (Master's)
- International Marketing of Innovation (Master's, double degree)
- Econometrics and Empirical Economics (Master's)
- Economics of Markets and Organizations (Master's)
- Economics & Ecology (Master's)
- Environmental and Natural Resources Economics (Master's)
- Public Policy and Development (Master's)
- Data Science for Social Sciences (Master's)
- Mathematics and Economic Decision (Master's)
- MIAGE on Innovative Information Systems (Master's)
- International Aviation Law (LL.M.)
- Comparative & European Private International Law (Master's)
- International Economic Law (Master's)
- Economics (Ph.D.)
- Management (Ph.D.) (partnership with the Grande ėcole Toulouse Business School)

== Research ==
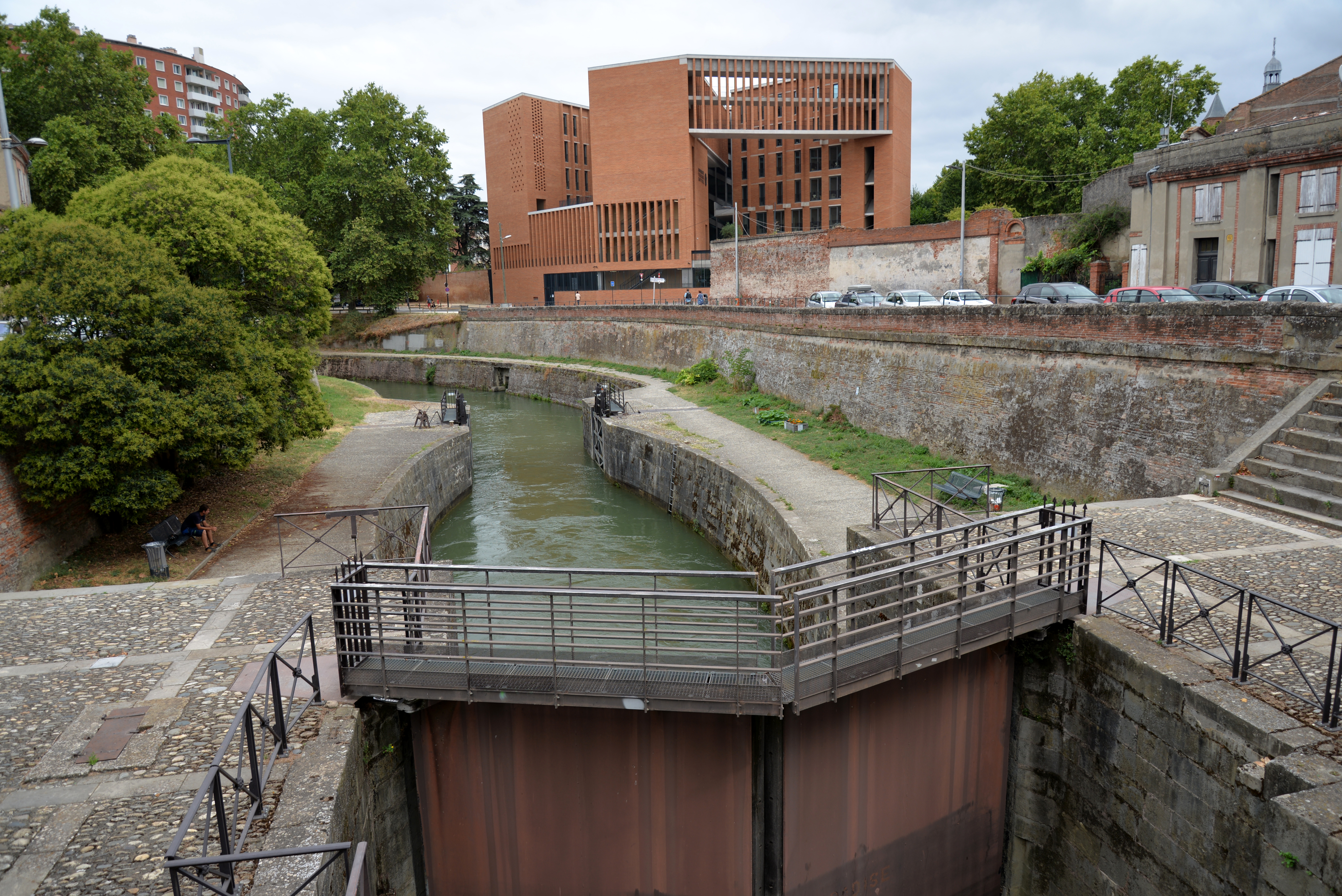
Toulouse School of Economics

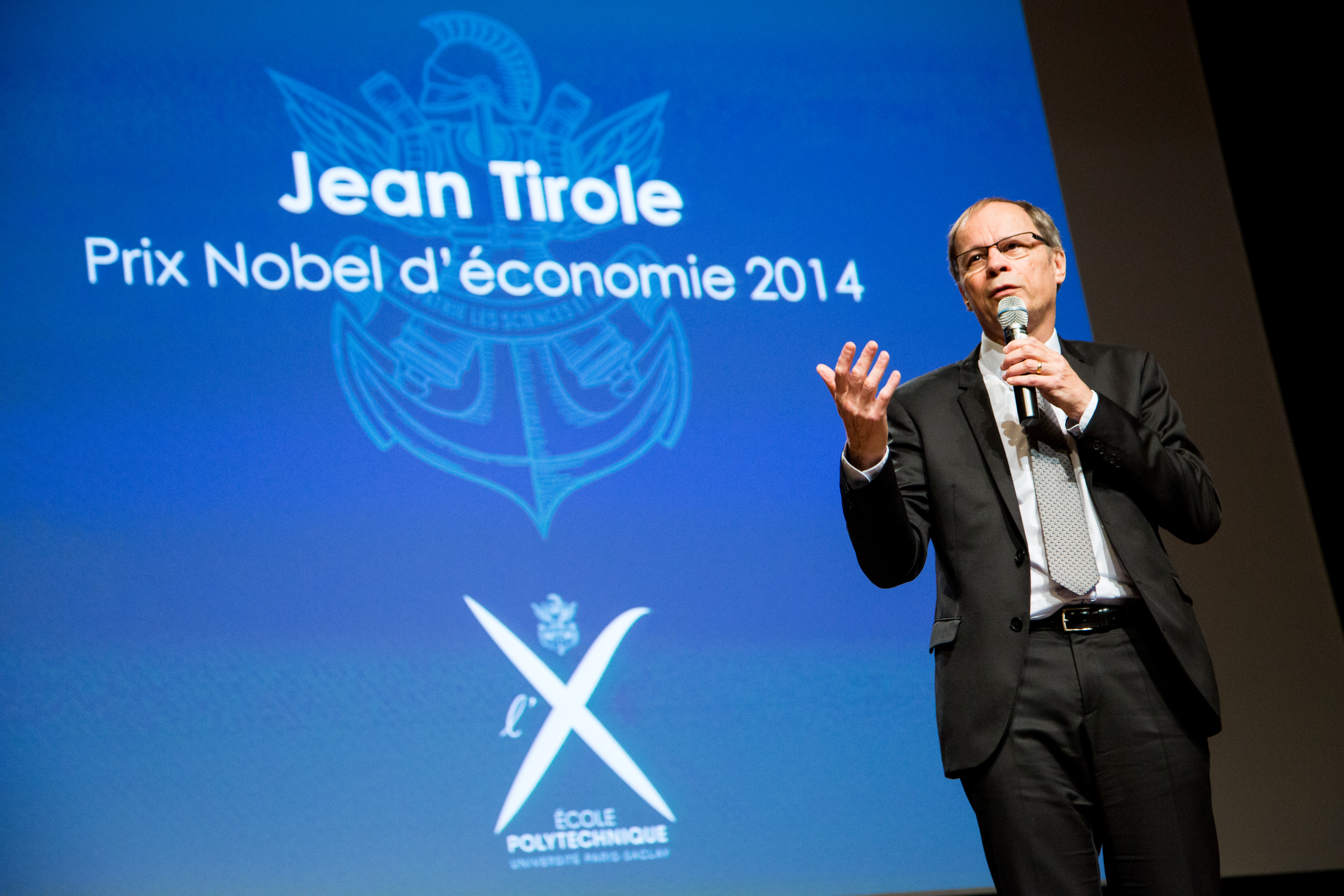
Jean Tirole, Nobel Prize 2014

The University of Toulouse I Capitole and Toulouse School of Economics professor Jean Tirole became a Nobel laureate in 2014. The internationalization of research is the other facet of the university's European and international strategy. The research centers are involved in numerous projects and scientific cooperation networks with foreign partners, particularly Canadian and Japanese. The University Toulouse Capitole is the home of many laboratories and research instituts:

- Centre de droit des affaires - Center for business law
- Centre toulousain d'histoire du droit et des idées politiques - Center for history and political science
- Institut de droit privé - Institute for private law
- Institut de mathématique de Toulouse - Institute of mathematics
- Institut de recherche en informatique de Toulouse - Institute of research into information technology
- Institut des études juridiques de l'urbanisme et de la construction - Institute for state law in urbanism
- Institut du droit de l'espace, des territoires et de la communication - Institute for Space, Territories, Culture and Communications Law
- Institut Maurice Hauriou - Institute for public law
- Institute of Research on European, International and Comparative Law
- Laboratoire des sciences sociales du politique - Laboratory of social science politics
- Laboratory of Studies and Research on Economics, Policies and Social Systems
- TSE-R is under tutelage of the CNRS (UMR 5314), the INRAE (UMR 1415), the EHESS, and the University Toulouse Capitole.
- Toulouse School of Management Research
- SIRIUS Chair - Space, Business, and Law - a public-private partnership between the Grande école Toulouse Business School, CNES, Airbus Defense & Space and Thales Alenia Space, dedicated to the law and management of space sector activities.

== Location ==
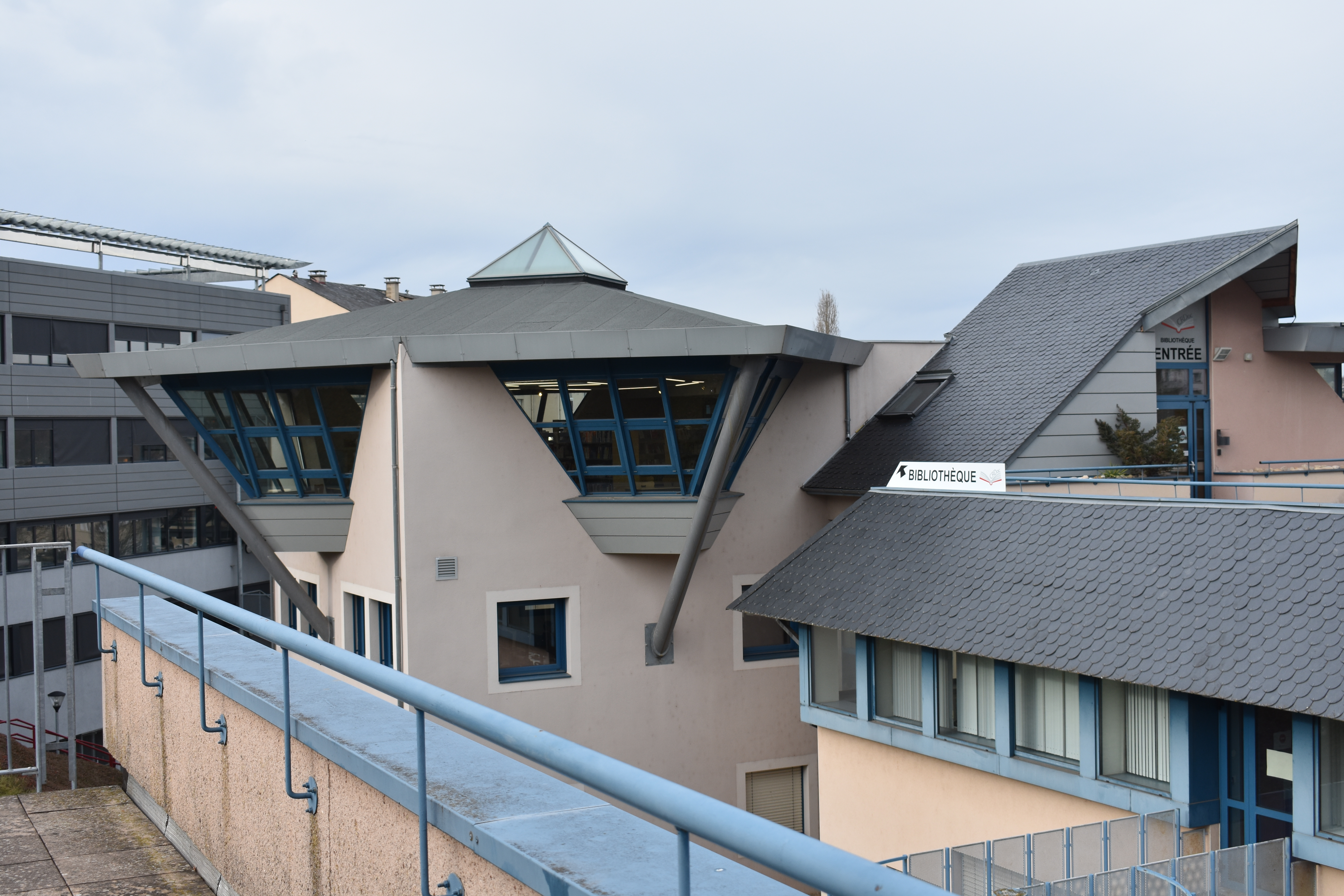
Rodez Campus

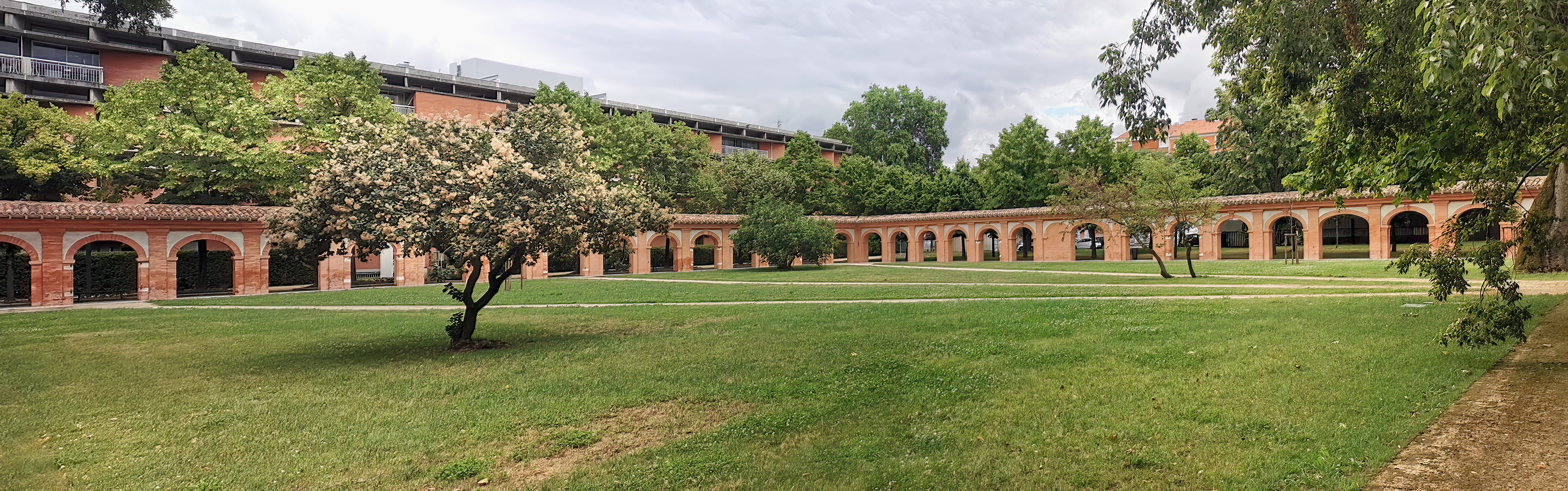
Arsenal Campus

UT Capitole is located on four sites in the city center and in the cities of Montauban and Rodez. University buildings cover an area of 78,000 m^{2} and are available to 17,000 students. On the two sites of the Arsenal and the Anciennes Facultés, a 2 minutes' walk from Place du Capitole, are located most lecture halls and classrooms as well as the main library on the Toulouse campus.

In the city center, there are the Anciennes Facultés where the Toulouse School of Management is located, as well as amphitheaters and two libraries (the Garrigou library in the Anciennes Facultés and the Godechot library in the IEP). The Anciennes Facultés are located at 2, rue Albert-Lautmann.

Also in the city center, the Arsenal, where the Faculty of Law and Political Science and the European School of Law are located, and most of the amphitheaters and classrooms, as well as the university's administrative services. This site also includes the Arsenal library, the university's main library. The Arsenal is located at 2, rue du Doyen-Gabriel-Marty. The campus also houses the Arsenal university restaurant as well as student residences.

Also in the center of Toulouse, the Manufacture des Tabacs, between the Garonne river and the Brienne canal is where most research and library centres are to be found. The Manufacture is located at 21, allée de Brienne and is situated on the other side of the Brienne canal from the two previously mentioned sites.

Two satellite campuses of the University Toulouse Capitole are located in Montauban and Rodez. In the city of Montauban, the University Center of Tarn-et-Garonne is located on Boulevard Montauriol, near the city center. The University of Toulouse Capitole offers the full undergraduate degree in law at this site. There is a library and a university restaurant on the campus. The University Institute of Technology of Rodez (IUT) is located at 50 avenue de Bordeaux in Rodez, Aveyron. The IUT provides a 3-year university education, offering several Bachelor of Technology (BUT) or undergraduate degrees (Licences - 3rd year), and emphasizing a technological approach combining theory and practice. The IUT has modern premises and equipment: 1 documentation center, 1 amphitheater, 1 technology hall, 2 learning labs, and 2 multimedia laboratories.

== Partnerships ==
Toulouse Capitole University is a founding member of the Federal University of Toulouse Midi-Pyrénées (French: Université fédérale de Toulouse Midi-Pyrénées), the association of universities and higher education institutions (ComUE),.Membership includes all large campuses in Toulouse: Jean Jaurès, Paul Sabatier University, INSA Toulouse, ISAE-SUPAERO, as well as the Grande école Toulouse Business School and the seven Grandes écoles of the National Polytechnic Institute of Toulouse. The university and Toulouse Business School (TBS) jointly award a EFMD-Accredited Ph.D. in management, faculty and students have access to the TBS Research Centre, and TBS research faculty serve on the board of directors.

== Libraries and Learning Centers ==
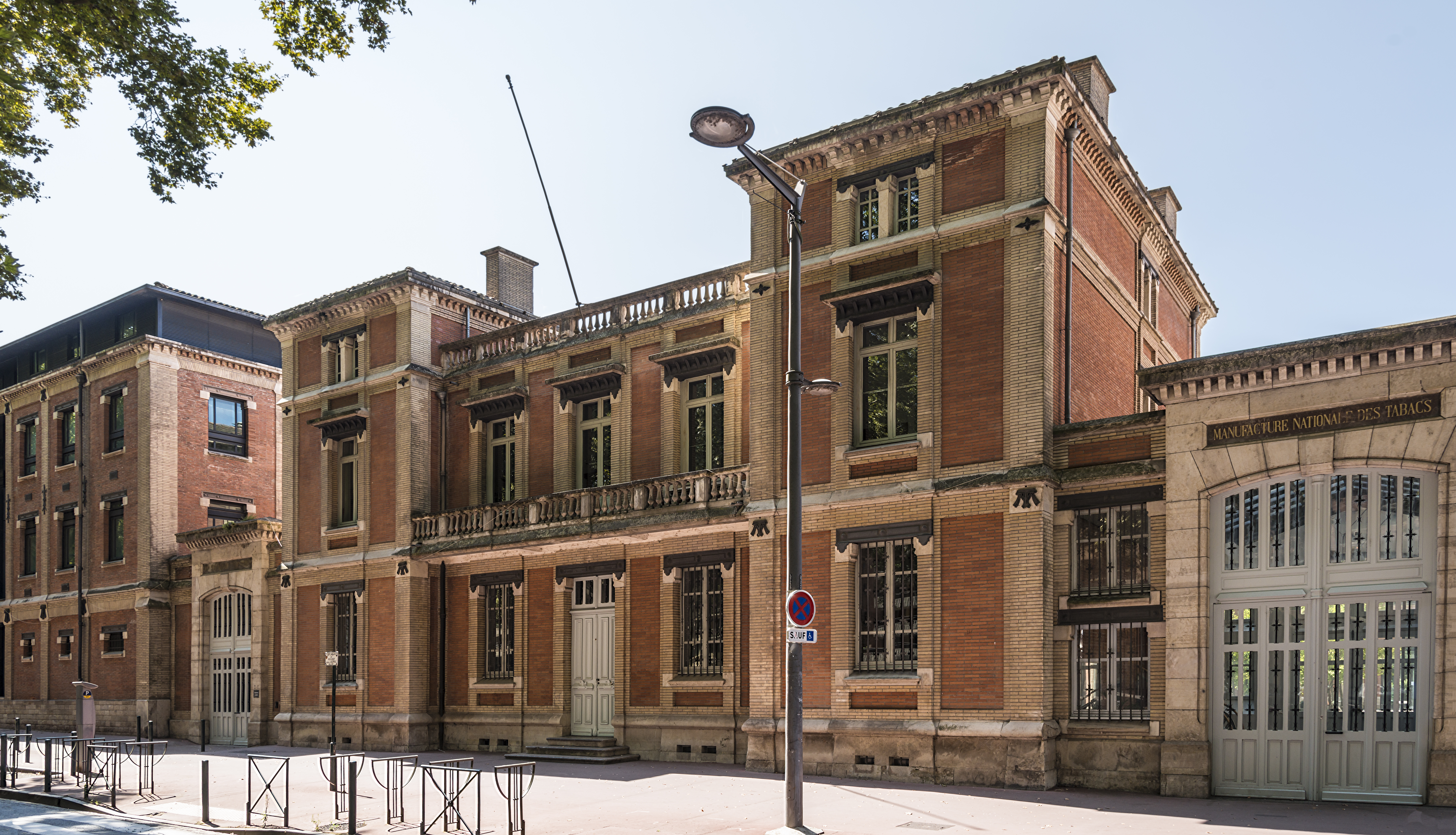
The former Toulouse Tobacco Factory is fully renovated with classrooms, research centers, and a library center.

The University of Toulouse I Capitole Library is the heir to the former university library created in 1879. Initially an inter-university library, its social sciences section was constituted as a Collective Service of Documentation in 1995. It is now made up of four libraries spread across the university campus.

The Arsenal library, representative of the modern architectural movement(Brutalism), was built in 1972 by the architects Paul de Noyers and Noël Le Maresquier. It offers 900 reading places. In addition to the 45,000 volumes belonging to the prestigious old collection (end of the 19th century - middle of the 20th century) and the volumes inherited from the Law-Literature section, the collections are now specialized in the disciplines taught at the university.

In 1996, a 450-seat library was installed in the renovated premises of the former Toulouse Tobacco Factory, which is now listed as a historical monument. Two other libraries make up Toulouse 1 Capitole's library facilities: the Garrigou library located in the heart of the historic building of the old Faculties and the Boutaric library. These libraries collaborate with the documentation centers of the university's teaching and research units.

In terms of written and documentary heritage, 320,000 e-books complete a collection of 568,000 printed works, 57,000 theses and dissertations. Over 80,500 online journals are added to the 390 print journal subscriptions; while some 75 specialized databases allow for in-depth bibliographic research.

== Faculty ==
- Hugues Kenfack, (born August 29, 1967), professor of law.
- Jean-Jacques Laffont, (13 April 1947 – 1 May 2004), economist.
- Paul Seabright, (born 8 July 1958), professor of economics.
- Jean Tirole, (born 9 August 1953), professor of economics, Nobel Prize in economic sciences in 2014.

== Doctorat honoris causa ==
Since the founding of today's Université Toulouse Capitole, countless professors, deans, directors, presidents of faculties, institutes, universities and regions, advisors and ministers have been awarded honorary doctorates by the university (see the complete list).

This was notably the case for José Luis Rodriguez Zapatero, Spain's former socialist prime minister, honored in 2015. The same year, Vassilios Skouris, then President of the European Court of Justice, also received the title. After the DHC awarded on June 9, 2023 to Ursula von der Leyen, President of the European Commission, and the German Judge of the Constitutional Court, Dieter Grimm was awarded a DHC on November 28, 2024, and Spanish writer Javier Cercas on December 8, 2025.

== Notable alumni ==
- Vincent Auriol - President of the République (1947-1954) under the IV^{e} Republique.
- Jaume Bartumeu - Former Prime Minister of Andorra
- Ramazan Bashardost - Afghan politician and former Minister of Planning of Afghanistan
- Jean-Pierre Bel - Former President of the French Senate
- Bertrand Delanoë - Former Mayor of Paris
- Nassim Belkhayat, CEO and co-founder of Neo Motors based in Morocco
- Carole Delga - President of the Regional Council of Occitanie
- Marguerite Dilhan first woman to open her own law firm and to plead before a criminal court in France at a time when women were not yet allowed to vote.
- Marlène Dolveck - Executive Vice President at CMA CGM, former CEO of SNCF Gares & Connexions
- Richard Ferrand - Former President of the French National Assembly
- Philippe Folliot - French senator
- Cho Hyun - Minister of Foreign Affairs of South Korea
- Mamadou Philippe Karambiri - Burkinabé evangelical pastor and founder of the International Evangelism Center - African Interior Mission
- Jean Laffitte - Prelate of the Catholic Church, former Secretary of the Pontifical Council for the Family
- Gaston Monnerville - French politician who served as the first President of the Senate under the Fifth Republic from 1958 to 1968
- Jean-Luc Moudenc - Mayor of Toulouse
- Alice Nkom - First woman lawyer of Cameroon and LGTB+ leader
- Hélène Parisot - French professional track cyclist
- Sylvia Pinel - Former Minister of Housing, French politician
- Aurélien Pradié - French politician
- Gilbert Saboya Sunyé - Andorran politician, former Minister of Foreign Affairs of Andorra
- Christine de Veyrac - French politician
- Christos Zois - Greek politician
- Trần Văn Giàu - Vietnamese revolutionary, leader of the Viet Minh in South Vietnam from 1945 to 1951.
