= Emmanuelle Auriol =

French economist

- Born: 5 December 1966 (age 59); Toulouse
- Occupation: Economist
- Known for: Chair of the Women in Economics (WinE) Committee

Emmanuelle Auriol (born 5 December 1966 in Toulouse) is a French economist. She is chair of the Women in Economics (WinE) Committee.

== Career ==
Auriol is an IDEI researcher, a member of the Toulouse School of Economics (TSE) of the Toulouse Capitole University. Initially, professor of economics at the University of Aix-Marseille (1996–1997), she then returned to the Toulouse Capitole University (1998-present), where she had defended her doctoral thesis "Réglementation du duopole naturel" (1992) under the supervision of Jean-Jacques Laffont. She is mainly devoted to the study of the regulation and organization theory, including industrial organization and the economics of development.

Auriol is a fellow of the European Economic Association. She is also a regular contributor to Le Monde and the economic press.

== Political positions ==
In 2015, as a solution to the problems posed by the labor shortage in certain economic sectors, Auriol proposed in Libération to "legalize economic immigration by selling visas to people who wish to work with us." In 2021, she was the co-author of a government-sponsored report that described how France's growth has been hampered by its immigration policies.

Ahead of the 2017 French presidential election, Auriol publicly endorsed Emmanuel Macron's candidacy.

== Awards ==
- 1996: Prize of the French Association of Banks
- 2002: Nominated for the Best Young Economist of France, the newspaper Le Monde
- 2003 Bronze Medal of the CNRS (Centre national de la recherche scientifique)
- 2003: Junior member of the Institut Universitaire de France
- 2009: Elected member of the Council of European Economic Association
- 2009-2012: ANR Research Grant on public procurement and capture rents - in the case of Paraguay

== Other activities ==
- Caisse des dépôts et consignations, Member of the Supervisory Board
- Cercle des économistes, Member

== Personal life ==
Auriol is married and has two children.

== Publications ==
- « Public Procurement and Rent-Seeking: The Case of Paraguay », IDEI Working Paper, n^{o} 661, 18 février 2011.(avec Thomas Flochel (University of Edinburgh) et Stéphane Straub (TSE))[ Texte complet (Fichier PDF, 477 Ko) ]
- « Economic Integration and Investment Incentives in Regulated Industries », IDEI Working Paper, n^{o} 555, mai 2009.(avec Sara Biancini)[ Texte complet (Fichier PDF) ]
- « Public Private Partnerships in Water and Electricity in Africa », Agence Française de Développement, n^{o} 38, janvier 2007.(avec Aymeric Blanc) [ Texte complet (Fichier PDF, 179 Ko) ]
- « Privatizations in Developing Countries and the Government's Budget Constraint », IDEI Working Paper, n^{o} 459, mai 2004.(avec Pierre M. Picard)[ Texte complet (Fichier PDF, 335 Ko) ]
- « Quality Signaling through Certification. Theory and an Application to Agricultural Seed Market », IDEI Working Paper, n^{o} 165, 2003.(avec Steven G.M. Schilizzi)[ Texte complet (Fichier PDF, 456 Ko) | Résumé (Fichier PDF, 41 Ko) ]
- « The Costs and Benefits of Symbolic Differentiation in the Work Place », IDEI Working Paper, n^{o} 101, 2000, révision 2002.(avec Régis Renault)[ Texte complet (Fichier PDF, 648 Ko) | Résumé (Fichier PDF, 61 Ko) ]

== Articles in journals ==
- « Education and Migration Choices in Hierarchical Societies: The Case of Matam, Senegal », Regional Science and Urban Economics. doi:10.1016/j.regsciurbeco.2012.04.005.(avec Jean-Luc Demonsant (Universidad Autonoma de Nuevo León))[ Texte complet (Fichier PDF, 406 Ko) ]
- « On the Optimal Number of Representatives », Public Choice. doi:10.1007/s11127-011-9801-3.(avec Robert J. Gary-Bobo)[ Version finale_Document de travail (Fichier PDF, 407 Ko) ]
- « A Theory of BOT Concession Contracts », Journal of Economic Behavior and Organization. doi:10.1016/j.jebo.2011.10.003.(avec Pierre M. Picard)[ Texte complet (Fichier PDF, 308 Ko) ]
- « The Marginal Cost of Public Funds and Tax Reform in Africa », Journal of Development Economics, vol. 97, n^{o} 1, janvier 2012, p. 58-72. doi:10.1016/j.jdeveco.2011.01.003.(avec Michael Warlters)[ Version finale_Document de travail (Fichier PDF, 509 Ko) | CGE model of "The marginal cost of public funds and tax reform in Africa" (30 Ko) ]
- « Government Outsourcing: Public Contracting with Private Monopoly », The Economic Journal, vol. 119, n^{o} 540, octobre 2009, p. 1464-1493. doi:10.1111/j.1468-0297.2009.02291.x.(avec Pierre M. Picard)
- « Capture and Corruption in Public Utilities: the Cases of Water and Electricity in Sub-Saharan Africa », Utilities Policy, vol. 17, n^{o} 2, juin 2009, p. 203-216.(avec Aymeric Blanc)
- « Infrastructure and Public Utilities Privatization in Developing Countries », The World Bank Economic Review, vol. 23, n^{o} 1, 2009, p. 77-100. doi:10.1093/wber/lhn014.(avec Pierre M. Picard)
- « Status and Incentives », The RAND Journal of Economics, vol. 39, n^{o} 1, Spring 2008, p. 305-326.(avec Régis Renault)
- « On Robust Constitution Design », Theory and Decision, vol. 62, n^{o} 3, mai 2007, p. 241-279.(avec Robert J. Gary-Bobo)
- « Corruption in Procurement and Public Purchase », International Journal of Industrial Organization, vol. 24, n^{o} 5, septembre 2006, p. 867-885.
- « Telecommunication Reforms in Developing Countries », Communications & Strategies, Special Issue, IDATE, Montpellier, novembre 2005, p. 31-53.
- « Taxation Base in Developing Countries », Journal of Public Economics, vol. 89, n^{o} 4, Special Issue: Cornell - ISPE Conference on Public Finance and Development, avril 2005, p. 625-646. doi:10.1016/j.jpubeco.2004.04.008.(avec Michael Warlters)
- The explosive combination of religious decentralization and autocracy: The case of Islam,
- Sale of visas: A smuggler's final song?
- Government outsourcing: Public contracting with private monopoly

== See also ==
- List of economists
