= Peter Klibanoff =

American economist

Academic background
- Education: Harvard University (BA 1990) Massachusetts Institute of Technology (PhD 1994)
- Doctoral advisor: Drew Fudenberg; Jean Tirole

Academic work
- Discipline: Managerial economics, Decision theory
- Institutions: Kellogg School of Management (1994–present)

Peter Klibanoff is an American economist who is currently John L. and Helen Kellogg Professor of Managerial Economics & Decision Sciences at the Kellogg School of Management.

== Biography ==
Kilbanoff obtained his BA in Applied Mathematics from the Harvard University in 1990 and his PhD in economics from the Massachusetts Institute of Technology in 1994 with a dissertation titled "Essays on Uncertainty in Economics" under the advisory of Drew Fudenberg and Jean Tirole. He joined the Kellogg School of Management shortly after receiving his PhD in 1994, where he worked as an assistant professor from 1994 to 2000, an associate professor from 2000 to 2014 and Professor since 2014.

His research interests include wide range of topics in economic theory such like decision theory (especially modelling decision making under uncertainty and ambiguity), game theory, mechanism design, and optimal pricing and regulation.

== Selected publications ==
- Klibanoff, P. & J. Morduch (1995). "Decentralization, externalities, and efficiency". Review of Economic Studies, 62 (2), pp. 223–247.
- Klibanoff, P.; Lamont, O. & T. A. Wizman (1998). "Investor reaction to salient news in closed‐end country funds". Journal of Finance, 53 (2), pp. 673–699.
- Klibanoff, P.; Marinacci, M. & S. Mukerji (2005). "A smooth model of decision making under ambiguity". Econometrica, 73 (6), pp. 1849–1892.
- Klibanoff, P.; Marinacci, M. & S. Mukerji (2012). "On the Smooth Ambiguity Model: A Reply". Econometrica, 80 (3), pp. 1303–1321.
- Baliga, S.; Hanany, E. & P. Klibanoff (2013). "Polarization and ambiguity". American Economic Review, 103 (7), pp. 3071–3083.
- Klibanoff, P.; Mukerji, S. & K. Seo (2014). "Perceived Ambiguity and Relevant Measures". Econometrica, 82 (5), pp. 1945–1978.
