= Phoebe Koundouri =

Cypriot environmental economist

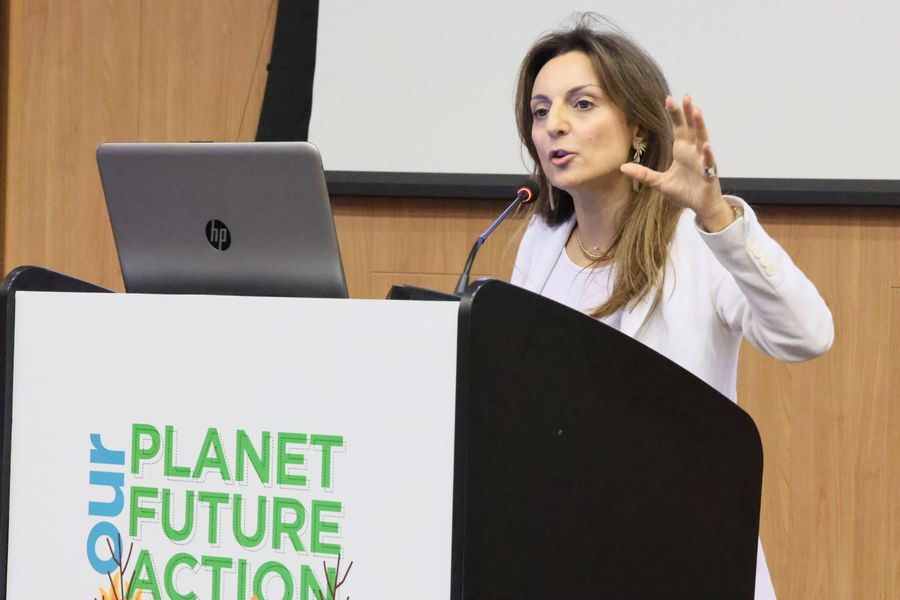
- Born: May 30, 1974 (age 52); Cyprus
- Education: University of Cambridge
- Known for: Integrating quantitative tools, systems thinking, and policy in sustainability science
- Spouse: Professor Nikitas Pittis
- Children: Chrysilia, Billie and Athena
- Scientific career
- Fields: Natural Resources Economics and Econometrics, Quantitative Sustainability Science, Mathematical Systems Science, Non-market Valuation Econometrics, Science-based Policy Design
- Workplaces: Athens University of Economics and Business, University of Cambridge
- Website: phoebekoundouri.org

Phoebe Koundouri is a professor of Environmental and Natural Resource Economics and Econometrics. Her research focuses on the interaction between socio-economic systems and the environment. According to a Stanford University database, she ranks (for multiple years) among the top 2% of scientists globally in terms of research impact and citations. She is also a member of the Nominating Committee for the Nobel Prize in Economics.

Koundouri is a Professor at the School of Economics, Department of International and European Economic Studies, at the Athens University of Economics and Business (AUEB). She is Founder and Director of the Research Laboratory on Socio-Economic and Environmental Sustainability (ReSEES) at the same university. She is a Visiting Professor at the Department of Earth Sciences, University of Cambridge, and a Senior Research Associate at Peterhouse at the University of Cambridge. She is also the Founder and Director of the Sustainable Development Unit at the Athena Research Center.

She is the founder and Scientific Director of the Alliance of Excellence for Research and Innovation on Aeiphoria (AE4RIA), a research network involving over 200 researchers and more than 100 competitively funded interdisciplinary projects across over 120 countries. She also serves as Chair of the UN Sustainable Development Solutions Network (SDSN) Global Climate Hub, and Co-Chair of SDSN Europe, which engages over 2,000 universities worldwide.

Professor Koundouri is an academician, elected fellow of several academies including Academia Europaea, World Academy of Art and Science, European Academy of Sciences and Arts, InterAcademy Partnership, Academy of Engineering and Technology of the Developing World, Pontifical Academy of Social Sciences – Program on the Fraternal Economy, European Association of Environmental and Resource Economists (EAERE), and the European Forest Institute. In 2020, she received a European Research Council Synergy Grant. In 2021, she was awarded the EAERE ERC Award for scientific excellence. In 2023, she received the Academy of Athens Award for Scientific Excellence., an award presented every four years by the Academy to recognize outstanding scientific contributions.

In 2019, she was elected President of the European Association of Environmental and Resource Economists (EAERE), a scientific association with more than 1,500 member institutions from over 75 countries. She currently serves as Chair of the World Council of Environmental and Natural Resource Economists Associations (WCEREA), which brings together regional associations including those in the USA, Latin America, Europe, Africa, Asia, and Oceania.

Professor Koundouri's international activities include advisory work in the multilateral space, such as Academia Europaea Representative to the S20 Task Force 2 on Bioeconomy of the G20 Heads of States, Commissioner for the Lancet Commission on COVID-19 Recovery, member of the Fraternal Economy of Integral and Sustainable Development of the Pontifical Academy of Social Sciences, the European Investment Bank Climate Leaders Network, the Leading Women for the Ocean (LWO), the National Board for Research and Innovation (NBRI) of Cyprus, the Special Scientific Committee on Climate Change of the Greek Ministry of the Environment and Energy and its representative in the International Climate Councils Network (ICCN), the Regional Action on Climate Change International Advisory Committee (RACC-IAC) associated with the STS Forum funded by the government of Japan; Earth-Humanity Coalition (EHC), EU Climate Pact Ambassador, Scientific and Conservation Council, Tour du Valat Institut de Recherche pour la Conservation des Zones Humides Méditerranéenne, EAERE observer for the 7th Assessment Report of the Intergovernmental Panel for Climate Change (IPCC) and scientific stakeholder to the IPCC Special Report on Climate Change and Cities, and Ambassador for the European Research Council (ERC). She has also acted as an advisor to the United Nations, G20, World Bank, European Commission, European Investment Bank, European Bank of Reconstruction and Development, OECD, World Health Organization, as well as governments and public and private organizations internationally.

She holds an MPhil and a PhD in Economics from the Faculty of Economics and Politics, Department of Economics, University of Cambridge, and has held academic positions at the University of Cambridge, University College London, University of Reading, London School of Economics and Political Science, and the Technical University of Denmark.

She has published 19 monographs and edited volumes, as well as more than 400 peer-reviewed scientific papers and around 200 articles in the public press, in fields such as economics and econometrics, mathematics, social sciences, environmental sciences, geosciences, multidisciplinary sciences and philosophy of science, including publications in Nature, The Lancet, and other leading economics, econometrics and sustainability science journals. She serves as editor or co-editor of several academic journals, including Nature: Climate Action, Environmental and Resource Economics, and Frontiers in Environmental Economics. She has also organized international scientific conferences, supervised PhD students, and delivered keynote speeches at international conferences and multilateral fora.

Her research spans climate economics, sustainable finance, biodiversity, water, innovation, and intergenerational equity, and has been cited in both academic and policy-making contexts.

She resides in Athens, Greece, with her husband, Professor Nikitas Pittis, and their three daughters Chrysilia, Billie and Athena.

== Distinctions & Awards ==
Professor Phoebe Koundouri has been recognized for her contributions to environmental and resource economics through election to several scientific academies and organizations, as well as awards for her research on sustainability and policy development.

Academy Fellowships and Scientific Societies

- Fellow, World Academy of Art and Science (Elected 2021)
- Fellow, Academia Europaea (Elected 2022)
- Fellow, European Academy of Sciences and Arts (Elected 2023)
- Fellow, European Forest Institute (Elected 2024)
- Fellow, European Association of Environmental and Resource Economists (EAERE) (Elected 2024)
- Fellow, Academy of Engineering and Technology of the Developing World (Elected 2024)

Awards & Recognitions

- 2023 – Excellence in Science Award, Academy of Athens, for contributions to the science of the marine environment.
- 2024 – Manolis Christofides Award.
- 2022 – Best Applied Paper Award, Journal of Benefit-Cost Analysis (for 2021 paper "Open Access in Scientific Information...").
- 2022 – Best Poster Award, 1st International Electronic Conference on Land.
- 2022 – Bharat Gaurav Samman – World Ambassador of Happiness and Peace, conferred at the House of Lords, London.
- 2021 – Member of the Nominating Committee for the Nobel Prize in Economics.
- 2021 – Recipient of the European Research Council (ERC) Synergy Grant – ERC Water Futures.
- 2021 – EAERE Award for ERC Grant laureates in environmental and resource economics.
- 2015 – Quality of Policy Contribution Award, European Association of Agricultural Economists (EAAE), for co-authored 2014 article.
- 2011 – Best Publication Award, EAAE (for 2009 paper in European Review of Agricultural Economics).
- 2019 – European Commission Horizon Impact Award, for the SMART-COASTS project.
- 1994 – Ronald L. Meeks Prize in Economics, University of Leicester.
- 1991 – European Bank for Reconstruction and Development Mathematics Award.

== History of Academic Positions ==
Professor Phoebe Koundouri has held academic positions at universities in the UK, Greece and Denmark.

- 1995–1996: Peterhouse College Supervisor, University of Cambridge, UK.
- 1996–1997: Research Assistant, Applied Economics Department, Faculty of Economics and Politics, University of Cambridge, UK.
- 1999–2000: Affiliated Lecturer in Economics, School of Public Policy, University College London (UCL), UK.
- 2000–2005: Lecturer (A and B with tenure) in Economics, Department of Economics, University of Reading, UK.
- 2000–2005: Senior Research Fellow, Department of Economics & CSERGE, University College London (UCL), UK.
- 2005–present: Professor in Economics, School of Economics, Athens University of Economics and Business (AUEB), Greece.
- 2013–2016: Visiting Senior Research Fellow, Grantham Research Institute on Climate Change and the Environment, London School of Economics and Political Science (LSE), UK.
- 2022–2025: Research Professor (part-time), Department of Technology, Management and Economics, Technical University of Denmark (DTU), Denmark.
- 2025–present: Visiting Professor, Department of Earth Sciences, University of Cambridge.

== Work & Influence ==
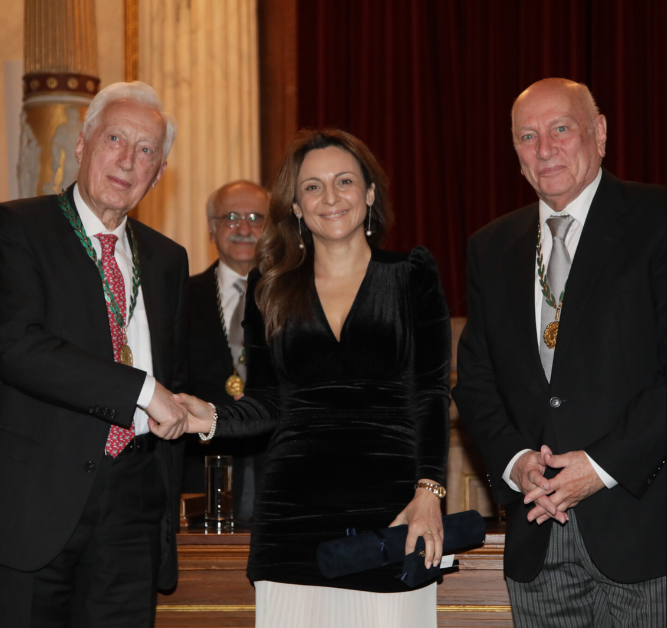
Academy of Athens Excellence in Science Award 2023 to Prof. Phoebe Koundouri

Professor Phoebe Koundouri's work in environmental and natural resource economics includes research on sustainability, the circular economy, and climate policy. She has collaborated with European and international institutions such as the European Commission, the United Nations, the World Bank, and the OECD.

As Chair of the UN Sustainable Development Solutions Network (SDSN) Global Climate Hub and Co-Chair of SDSN Europe, she has been involved in work related to the implementation of the European Green Deal and sustainable finance initiatives. She has also contributed to policy discussions on climate resilience, water resource management, and biodiversity conservation.

=== Leadership and Institutional Roles ===
In addition to her academic positions, Professor Koundouri has held leadership roles in a number of research and sustainability organizations:

- Director, Research Laboratory on Socio-Economic and Environmental Sustainability (ReSEES), Athens University of Economics and Business
- Director, Sustainable Development Unit (SDU), ATHENA Research and Innovation Center
- Founder and Scientific Director, Alliance of Excellence for Research and Innovation on Aeiphoria (AE4RIA)
- Chair, World Council of Environmental and Natural Resource Economists Associations (WCEREA)
- Chair, UN Sustainable Development Solutions Network (SDSN) Global Climate Hub
- Co-Chair, SDSN Europe
- Honorary Co-Chair, SDSN Greece
- Co-Chair, SDSN European Green Deal Senior Working Group
- Co-Lead, Academia Europaea Task Force on Environment, Sustainability, and Climate (TFESC)
- Co-Lead, Scientific Committee, InterAcademy Partnership (IAP) Statement on Human Security
- President (2020–2021), Executive President (2022–2023), Past President (2024–2025) and Council Member, European Association of Environmental and Resource Economists (EAERE)
- Director (2018–2022), EIT Climate KIC Hub Greece
- Chair (2020–2021), Vice-Chair (2018–2019), Scientific Advisory Board, European Forest Institute
- Chair (2014), Scientific Advisory Board, ICRE8: International Research Center on the Environment and the Economy
- Chair, Scientific Advisory Board of the Post Bank Green Institute, Greece (2010–2011).
- Deputy Member, Temporary General Assembly of the Hellenic Research and Innovation Foundation (ELIDEK)

Throughout her career, she has led more than 100 European and international research projects, funded by the European Union and other organizations, with outputs cited in both academic and policy-making contexts.

She is also a frequent speaker at international conferences and multilateral fora on sustainability and economic policy.

== Editorial Roles and Journal Memberships ==
Professor Koundouri has served in editorial roles for a number of academic journals and book series in the fields of environmental and resource economics, sustainability, and development.

- 2025–present: Editor, Elements Book Series in Environmental and Resource Economics and Development (Cambridge University Press)
- 2025–present: Editorial Board Member, Environment and Public Health Research
- 2023–present: Associate Editor, Nature Climate Action
- 2022–present: Associate Editor, Annual Review of Resource Economics
- 2022–present: Senior Editor, Cambridge Prisms: Water
- 2022–present: Topic Editor, Ocean Solutions, Frontiers in Marine Science
- 2022–present: Field Chief Editor, Frontiers in Environmental Economics
- 2022–present: Editorial Board Member, Green and Low-Carbon Economy (GLCE)
- 2022–present: Editorial Board Member, Highlights of Sustainability
- 2021–present: Editorial Board Member, Climate Action (Springer)
- 2020–present: Editorial Board Member, International Review of Environmental and Resource Economics
- 2020–present: Editor, Q Open Journal (Oxford University Press)
- 2020–present: Scientific Advisory Board Member, Economia Agro-Alimentare / Food Economy
- 2020–present: Editorial Manager, Environmental Development (Elsevier)
- 2015–present: Editorial Board Member, Review of Environmental Economics and Policy (REEP) (Oxford University Press)
- 2012–present: Co-Editor, Environmental and Resource Economics (Springer)
- 2012–present: Associate Editor, Journal of Water Resources and Economics (Elsevier)
- 2012–2016: Editor, EAERE Newsletter
- 2018–present: Editorial Board Member, Energies (MDPI)
- 2018–present: Editorial Board Member, Sustainability (MDPI)
- 2018–present: Editorial Board Member, Forests (MDPI)
- 2018–present: Editorial Board Member, International Journal of Economy, Energy and Environment (IJEEEP)
- 2017–present: Editorial Board Member, Innovative Techniques in Agriculture (ITAG)
- 2017–present: Editorial Board Member, Forest Research (Gavin Publishers)
- 2017–present: Editorial Board Member, Environmental Analysis and Ecology Studies
- 2015–present: Associate Editor, Frontiers in Marine Science (Marine Research section)
- 2015–present: Editorial Board Member, Ecology and Environmental Science (Collabra, UC Press)
- 2015–present: Editorial Board Member, Research Journal of Environmental Sciences (Scialert)
- 2015–present: Editorial Board Member, Journal of Marine Science Research and Technology (Clytoaccess)
- 2015–present: Editorial Board Member, AIMS Agriculture (AIMS Press)
- 2014–present: Associate Editor, Ocean Engineering, Technology, and Solutions for the Blue Economy (Frontiers)
- 2013–present: Editorial Board Member, International Journal of Agricultural Extension
- 2013–present: Editorial Board Member, Journal of South Asian Studies (Taylor & Francis)
- 2012–present: Editorial Board Member, Journal of Water Sciences Research
- 2012–present: Editorial Board Member, Journal of Business and Finance
- 2011–present: Editorial Board Member, Journal of Environmental Economics and Policy (Taylor & Francis)
- 2010–present: Editorial Board Member, Review of Agricultural and Environmental Studies
- 2009–present: Editorial Board Member, Environmental Science and Technology (Elsevier)
- 2008–present: Editorial Board Member, International Journal of Environmental Research and Public Health (MDPI)
- 2008–present: Editorial Board Member, Recent Patents on Food, Nutrition & Agriculture (Bentham Science Publishers)
- 2007–present: Editorial Board Member, The Open Agriculture Journal (Bentham Science Publishers)
- 2007–present: Associate Editor, Open Agriculture Reviews (Bentham Science Publishers)
- 2007–present: Associate Editor, Economics-ejournal (Kiel Institute for the World Economy)
- 2005–2010: Associate Editor, Environment and Development Economics (Cambridge University Press)

== Committee Memberships and Advisory Positions ==
Prof. Phoebe Koundouri has served as a member of international, European, and national committees and advisory boards, including:

- Scientific Committee Member, "Common Home of Humanity" initiative, Pontifical Academy of Social Sciences
- Member, European Investment Bank (EIB) Climate and Environment Advisory Council
- Ambassador, European Research Council (ERC) Public Engagement
- Ambassador, European Climate Pact
- Member, European Commission Mission Board for Adaptation to Climate Change and Societal Transformation
- Scientific Advisor, World Health Organization (WHO) Health and Climate Change Platform
- Member, G20 High-Level Independent Panel on Financing the Global Commons for Pandemic Preparedness and Response (Observer)
- Observer and Contributor, Intergovernmental Panel on Climate Change (IPCC) Stakeholder Dialogues
- Expert Consultant, OECD
- Scientific Advisor, Lancet COVID-19 Commission
- Expert Advisor, World Bank Global Water Practice
- Policy Expert, European Bank for Reconstruction and Development (EBRD)
- Steering Committee Member, Earth–Humanity Coalition (EHC)
- Member, Special Scientific Committee on Climate Change, Greek Ministry of Environment and Energy
- Member, Scientific Committee, European Environment Agency (EEA) (past)
- Member, Scientific Advisory Board, Ministry of Education, Greece (past)
- Advisor, Bank of Greece Climate Change Impacts Study Committee (past)

== Education ==
Phoebe Koundouri studied economics in the United Kingdom.

- 1991–1994: BA in Economics (First Class Honours), University of Leicester, Department of Economics, Faculty of Social Sciences. She received the Ronald L. Meeks Prize, awarded by the University of Leicester to the best student of the 1990s decade. She studied with a full scholarship from the University of Leicester and the Government of Cyprus.
- 1994–1995: MPhil in Economics (Distinction), University of Cambridge, Faculty of Economics and Politics, UK. She was awarded a full scholarship from the University of Cambridge and Peterhouse College.
- 1996–2000: PhD in Economics, University of Cambridge, Faculty of Economics and Politics. Thesis: Three Approaches to Measuring Natural Resource Scarcity: Theory and Application to Groundwater. Supervisors: Prof. Paul Seabright and Prof. Partha Dasgupta.

== Research and Project Leadership ==
Prof. Koundouri is a mathematical economist and econometrician whose research is focused on sustainable development, natural resource economics, and decision-making under uncertainty.

Her work combines interdisciplinary systems science, decision theory, mathematical economic modelling, behavioral approaches, and econometrics to develop frameworks for analyzing the economic value of natural resources and public goods, including externalities such as climate change. These models are used in the design of policy instruments that aim to support sustainable and intergenerational welfare.

She has coordinated or participated in more than 100 European and international research projects in areas such as climate policy, sustainability economics, and innovation. Many of these projects are organized under the Alliance of Excellence for Research and Innovation on Aeiphoria (AE4RIA), which covers the following thematic areas:

- Climate Neutrality and Resilience
- Sustainable Seas and Oceans
- Water–Food–Energy–Biodiversity Nexus and Land Use
- Innovation Accelerators
- Sustainable Finance and Behavioral Economics
- Education and Up-Skilling
- Global Initiatives

Her academic research also covers sustainable finance and innovation for climate transitions, employing econometric, general equilibrium, and impact assessment models to evaluate long-term cost–benefit analysis under uncertainty. She has also published work on socio-economic policy analysis and governance related to sustainability, focusing on the design and implementation of strategies for climate resilience and international cooperation.

== Books ==
Phoebe Koundouri has published 19 books and more than 600 scientific articles, in the fields of Economics and Econometrics, Mathematics, Social Sciences, Environmental Sciences, Geosciences, Multidisciplinary Sciences, and Philosophy of Science, with publications in journals such as Nature, The Lancet, and Environmental and Resource Economics.

1. Koundouri, Phoebe (2000). Three approaches to measuring natural resource scarcity: Theory and application to groundwater (Thesis). Apollo - University of Cambridge Repository. doi:10.17863/CAM.16514.
2. Koundouri, Phoebe; Pashardes, P.; Swanson, T.; Xepapadeas, A. (2003). The Economics of Water Management in Developing Countries: Problems, Principles and Policies. Cheltenham, U.K.: Edward Elgar Publishing. p. 296. ISBN 978-1-84376-122-8.
3. Koundouri, Phoebe (2004). Econometrics Informing Natural Resources Management: Selected Empirical Analyses. New Horizons in Environmental Economics. Cheltenham, U.K.: Edward Elgar Publishing. p. 416. ISBN 978-1-84376-922-4.
4. Koundouri, Phoebe; Karousakis, K.; Assymakopoulos, D.; Lagema, M.; Jeffrey, P. (2006). Water Management in Arid and Semi-Arid Regions: Interdisciplinary Perspectives. Cheltenham, U.K.: Edward Elgar Publishing. p. 288. ISBN 1845424239.
5. Koundouri, Phoebe (2008). Coping with Water Deficiency: From Research to Policy Making. Environment and Policy Series. Vol. 48. Springer. p. 243. ISBN 978-1-4020-6614-6.
6. Birol, Ekin; Koundouri, Phoebe (2008). Choice Experiments Informing Environmental Policy: A European Perspective. New Horizons in Environmental Economics. Edward Elgar Publishing. p. 337. ISBN 978-1-84542-725-2. "foreword by Vic Adamowicz"
7. Koundouri, Phoebe (2009). The Use of Economic Valuation in Environmental Policy: Providing Research Support for the Implementation of EU Water Policy under AquaStress. Routledge Explorations in Environmental Economics (Paperback (2011) ed.). Routledge, Taylor and Francis Group. p. 264. ISBN 978-0-415-45323-3.
8. Koundouri, Phoebe (2010). Water Resources Allocation: Policy and Socioeconomic Issues in Cyprus. Environment and Policy Series. Vol. 1. Springer. p. 164. doi:10.1007/978-90-481-9825-2. ISBN 978-90-481-9824-5.
9. Koundouri, Phoebe; Papandreou, N.; Stithou, M. (2013). Water Resources Management Sustaining Socio-Economic Welfare: The Implementation of the European Water Framework Directive in Asopos River Basin in Greece. Global Issues in Water Policy. Springer. p. 181. doi:10.1007/978-94-007-7636-4. ISBN 978-94-007-7635-7.
10. Koundouri, Phoebe (2017). Phoebe Koundouri (ed.). The Ocean of Tomorrow, Investment Assessment of Multi-Use Offshore Platforms: Methodology and Applications – Volume 1. Springer International Publishing. p. 143. doi:10.1007/978-3-319-55772-4. ISBN 978-3-319-55770-0.
11. Secco, Laura; Koundouri, Phoebe (2020). Evaluation Manual: Innovative methods to assess social innovation and its impacts in marginalised rural areas. SIMRA Project.
12. Koundouri, Phoebe (2021). Phoebe Koundouri (ed.). The Ocean of Tomorrow: The Transition to Sustainability – Volume 2. Environment & Policy. Vol. 57. Springer Publishing. doi:10.1007/978-3-030-56847-4. ISBN 978-3-030-56845-0.
13. Koundouri, Phoebe; Alamanos, A. (2024). Phoebe Koundouri (ed.). Encyclopedia of Water Policy, Economics and Management. Edward Elgar Publishing.

=== Selected Articles and Top-Cited Publications ===
1. Sachs, J. D., Karim, S. S. A., Aknin, L., Allen, J., Brosbøl, K., Colombo, F., Barron, G. C., et al. (2022). The Lancet Commission on lessons for the future from the COVID-19 pandemic. The Lancet, 400(10359), 1224–1280. https://doi.org/10.1016/S0140-6736(22)01585-9
2. Birol, E., Karousakis, K., & Koundouri, P. (2006). Using a choice experiment to account for preference heterogeneity in wetland attributes: The case of Cheimaditida wetland in Greece. Ecological Economics, 60(1), 145–156. https://doi.org/10.1016/j.ecolecon.2006.06.002
3. Koundouri, P., Nauges, C., & Tzouvelekas, V. (2006). Technology adoption under production uncertainty: Theory and application to irrigation technology. Oxford Economic Papers.
4. Birol, E., Karousakis, K., & Koundouri, P. (2006). Using economic valuation techniques to inform water resources management: A survey and critical appraisal of available techniques and an application. Science of the Total Environment, 365(1–3), 105–122. https://doi.org/10.1016/j.scitotenv.2006.02.032
5. Genius, M., Koundouri, P., Nauges, C., & Tzouvelekas, V. (2014). Information transmission in irrigation technology adoption and diffusion: Social learning, extension services, and spatial effects. American Journal of Agricultural Economics, 96(1), 328–344. https://doi.org/10.1093/ajae/aat054
6. Kløve, B., Allan, A., Bertrand, G., Druzynska, E., Ertürk, A., Goldscheider, N., et al. (2011). Groundwater dependent ecosystems. Part II. Ecosystem services and management in Europe under risk of climate change and land use intensification. Environmental Science & Policy.
7. Koundouri, P. (2004). Current issues in the economics of groundwater resource management. Journal of Economic Surveys, 18(5), 703–740. https://doi.org/10.1111/j.0950-0804.2004.00233.x
8. Pearce, D., Groom, B., Hepburn, C., & Koundouri, P. (2003). Valuing the future. World Economics, 4(2), 121–141.
9. Groom, B., Hepburn, C., Koundouri, P., & Pearce, D. (2005). Declining discount rates: The long and the short of it. Environmental and Resource Economics, 32(4), 445–493. https://doi.org/10.1007/s10640-005-4681-y
10. Navarro-Ortega, A., Acuña, V., Bellin, A., Burek, P., Cassiani, G., et al. (2015). Managing the effects of multiple stressors on aquatic ecosystems under water scarcity: The GLOBAQUA project. Science of the Total Environment, 503, 3–9. https://doi.org/10.1016/j.scitotenv.2014.06.081
11. Remoundou, K., & Koundouri, P. (2009). Environmental effects on public health: An economic perspective. International Journal of Environmental Research and Public Health, 6(8), 2160–2178. https://doi.org/10.3390/ijerph6082160
12. Smale, M., Lipper, L., & Koundouri, P. (2006). Scope, limitations and future directions. In Valuing crop biodiversity: On-farm genetic resources and economic change (pp. [exact pages needed]). CABI.
13. Remoundou, K., Koundouri, P., Kontogianni, A., Nunes, P. A. L. D., & Skourtos, M. (2009). Valuation of natural marine ecosystems: An economic perspective. Environmental Science & Policy, 12(7), 1040–1051. https://doi.org/10.1016/j.envsci.2009.06.010
14. Koundouri, P., Laukkanen, S. M., & Myyra, S. (2009). The effects of EU agricultural policy changes on farmers' risk attitudes. European Review of Agricultural Economics, 36, 1–20. https://doi.org/10.1093/erae/jbp001
15. Koundouri, P. (2004). Potential for groundwater management: Gisser–Sanchez effect reconsidered. Water Resources Research, 40(6), W06S16. https://doi.org/10.1029/2003WR002164
