= Bart Muys =

Belgian ecologist and professor in forest ecology

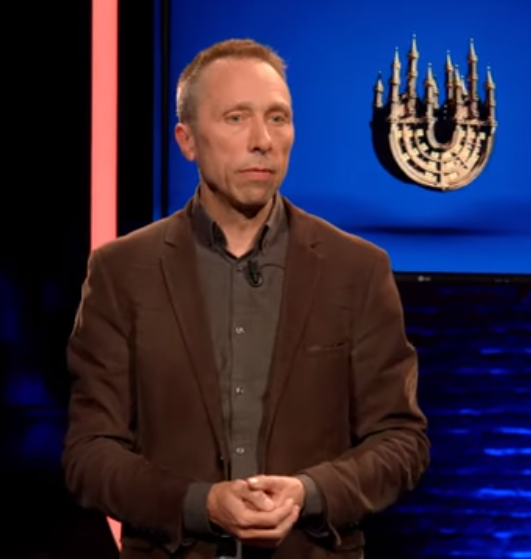
- Born: 1963 (age 62–63)
- Occupation: professor

Academic background
- Education: Ghent University
- Thesis: Synecological evaluation of the earthworm activity and litter decomposition in forests of the Flemish region: contribution to sustainable forest management (1993)

Academic work
- Discipline: forest ecology and forest management
- Institutions: KU Leuven

Bart Muys (born 1963) is a Belgian forest ecologist, environmental scientist, and academic who serves as Full Professor of Forest Ecology and Management at KU Leuven in Belgium.

He is head of the Division of Forest, Nature and Landscape within the Department of Earth and Environmental Sciences and a member of the KU Leuven Plant Institute. Muys is known for his work on forest ecology, sustainable forest management, biodiversity and ecosystem services, bioeconomy, restoration ecology, and climate change mitigation.

His research has contributed to the development of sustainability indicators for forestry, ecosystem service assessment frameworks, and strategies for climate-resilient forest management.

== Biography ==
Muys studied forestry at Ghent University, where he earned a degree in agricultural engineering with specialization in forestry and nature management. He later completed a PhD in Agricultural Sciences with a specialization in Forest Ecology at Ghent University. His doctoral work focused on forest ecology and laid the foundation for his later research on ecosystem functioning, biodiversity, and sustainable land management. He subsequently developed an interdisciplinary approach that combines ecology, forestry, environmental sciences, and systems analysis.

== Career ==
Muys began his academic career at Ghent University, where he was a doctoral research fellow from 1987 to 1992 and later served as a research assistant at the Laboratory for Forestry from 1993 to 1995. Between 1995 and 1997 he was director of the Royal Institute for Sustainable Management of Natural Resources and Promotion of Clean Technology (KINT) in Brussels, where he worked on the interface between environmental science and sustainability policy.

In 1997 Muys joined KU Leuven as a lecturer in the Laboratory of Forest, Nature and Landscape. He became a senior lecturer in 2001 and was appointed professor in 2003. In 2008 he was promoted to full professor at the Division of Forest, Nature and Landscape. At KU Leuven he has held a series of leadership positions, including head of the Division of Forest, Nature and Landscape and member of the faculty and departmental governing bodies. He has also served as secretary of the Doctoral Commission of the Faculty of Bioscience Engineering and has been involved in university sustainability initiatives through the Sustainability Council and the interdisciplinary think tank Metaforum.

Muys has played a central role in expanding forest ecology and sustainability research at KU Leuven. Under his leadership, the Forest, Nature and Landscape division has developed a strong international profile in forest ecology, silviculture, ecosystem service assessment, and bioeconomy research.

In addition to his work at KU Leuven, Muys has held international research positions, including a period as senior researcher at the Mediterranean Regional Office of the European Forest Institute (EFIMED) in Spain. Through these activities he has contributed to European initiatives addressing forests, climate change, biodiversity conservation, and sustainable development.

== Research ==
Muys’s research focuses on understanding how forests can contribute to climate stability, biodiversity conservation, and sustainable development. His work combines ecological field research with systems modeling, sustainability assessment, and decision-support methods. His work has been cited more than 20,000 times and has influenced research in forest ecology, ecosystem services, climate change mitigation, and sustainable land management. He has authored or co-authored hundreds of scientific publications and has contributed to interdisciplinary research networks across Europe, Africa, Asia, and Latin America.

=== Forest ecology and biodiversity ===
A major theme of Muys’s research is the relationship between biodiversity and ecosystem functioning. He has investigated how tree species diversity affects productivity, carbon sequestration, nutrient cycling, and resilience to environmental change. His work has demonstrated the importance of mixed-species forests for maintaining ecosystem stability and providing multiple ecosystem services.

Muys has also studied litter decomposition, soil processes, forest succession, and below-ground biodiversity, contributing to the understanding of how ecological interactions shape forest functioning over long time scales. His research integrates plant traits, soil ecology, and ecosystem processes to explain variation in carbon storage and nutrient dynamics.

=== Sustainable forest management ===
Muys has made contributions to the development of indicators and assessment tools for sustainable forest management. His work has addressed greenhouse gas balances, nutrient balances, energy efficiency, and long-term sustainability in managed forest systems. He has advocated for management approaches that optimize multiple ecosystem services rather than focusing solely on timber production.

=== Climate change and carbon sequestration ===
A central aspect of Muys’s work concerns the role of forests in climate change mitigation and adaptation. He has investigated carbon stocks, carbon sequestration, and the interactions between forest management and greenhouse gas dynamics. His research has examined how different forest management strategies affect ecosystem resilience under climate change.

He has emphasized the importance of climate-smart forestry and the integration of ecological principles into forest policy. His studies have informed discussions on the role of forests in meeting international climate targets and in supporting the transition to a low-carbon economy.

=== Restoration ecology and tropical forests ===
Muys has conducted research on restoration ecology, particularly in tropical dry forests. His work examines how degraded ecosystems recover and how restoration strategies can enhance biodiversity, ecosystem services, and social-ecological resilience. He has been involved in projects on tropical forest restoration, climate-smart agriculture, and sustainable perennial crop systems.

=== Bioeconomy and sustainability science ===
Muys has been an advocate of the bioeconomy as a framework for sustainable development. He has explored the environmental implications of bioenergy systems and biomass production, focusing on how biological resources can contribute to economic development while remaining within ecological limits.

== Other works ==
He has participated in reports and advisory activities addressing the links between biodiversity, climate mitigation, water resources, and the bioeconomy. He serves as chair of the Scientific Advisory Board of the Circular Bioeconomy Alliance and of the scientific advisory board of the European Forest Institute.

Muys has advocated for stronger integration of biodiversity conservation into forest management and for improved public understanding of ecology and plant diversity. He has emphasized the need for science-based policies that recognize forests as multifunctional systems providing ecological, economic, and cultural benefits.

At KU Leuven, Muys teaches courses in forest ecology, silviculture, biodiversity and ecosystem services, biological production systems, and integrated land and forest management. He has supervised numerous doctoral researchers and has contributed to the training of a generation of forest ecologists, environmental scientists, and sustainability professionals.

== Books ==
- Den Ouden, J., Muys, B., Mohren, G. M. J., & Verheyen, K. (2010), Bosecologie en bosbeheer, Uitgeverij Acco, ISBN 978-90-2347212-4
- Heil, G.W., Muys, B. & Hansen, K. (2007) Environmental Effects of Afforestation in North-Western Europe: From Field Observations to Decision Support, Springer Publ., Series Plant and Vegetation Vol. 1, 325p. ISBN 978-1-4020-4568-4

=== Articles ===
- Coppin, P.; Jonckheere, I.; Nackaerts, K.; Muys, B.; Lambin, E. (2004). "Review ArticleDigital change detection methods in ecosystem monitoring: a review". International Journal of Remote Sensing. 25 (9): 1565–1596. Bibcode:2004IJRS...25.1565C. doi:10.1080/0143116031000101675. ISSN 0143-1161.
- Achten, W.M.J.; Verchot, L.; Franken, Y.J.; Mathijs, E.; Singh, V.P.; Aerts, R.; Muys, B. (December 2008). "Jatropha bio-diesel production and use". Biomass and Bioenergy. 32 (12): 1063–1084. Bibcode:2008BmBe...32.1063A. doi:10.1016/j.biombioe.2008.03.003.
- Ellison, David; Morris, Cindy E.; Locatelli, Bruno; Sheil, Douglas; Cohen, Jane; Murdiyarso, Daniel; Gutierrez, Victoria; Noordwijk, Meine van; Creed, Irena F.; Pokorny, Jan; Gaveau, David; Spracklen, Dominick V.; Tobella, Aida Bargués; Ilstedt, Ulrik; Teuling, Adriaan J.; Gebrehiwot, Solomon Gebreyohannis; Sands, David C.; Muys, Bart; Verbist, Bruno; Springgay, Elaine; Sugandi, Yulia; Sullivan, Caroline A. (March 2017). "Trees, forests and water: Cool insights for a hot world". Global Environmental Change. 43: 51–61. Bibcode:2017GEC....43...51E. doi:10.1016/j.gloenvcha.2017.01.002. ISSN 0959-3780.
- Reubens, Bert; Poesen, Jean; Danjon, Frédéric; Geudens, Guy; Muys, Bart (26 June 2007). "The role of fine and coarse roots in shallow slope stability and soil erosion control with a focus on root system architecture: a review". Trees. 21 (4): 385–402. Bibcode:2007Trees..21..385R. doi:10.1007/s00468-007-0132-4.
- Phillips, Helen R. P.; Guerra, Carlos A.; Bartz, Marie L. C.; Briones, Maria J. I.; Muys, Bart (25 October 2019). "Global distribution of earthworm diversity". Science. 366 (6464): 480–485. Bibcode:2019Sci...366..480P. doi:10.1126/science.aax4851. ISSN 1095-9203. PMC 7335308. PMID 31649197.
- Muys, Bart; Messier, Christian (7 November 2023). "Climate-smart forest management caught between a rock and a hard place". Annals of Forest Science. 80 (1): 43. Bibcode:2023AnFSc..80...43M. doi:10.1186/s13595-023-01208-5. ISSN 1297-966X.
