= David Martimort =

French economist

David Martimort is a French economist and Professor at the Toulouse School of Economics. Martimort is one of the most highly cited researchers in the field of contract theory. His research has been awarded the Best Young French Economist Award in 2004.

== Biography ==
David Martimort was born in Langon, Gironde on 8 May 1967. He originally studied at the École Polytechnique (1986–89), but then obtained a master's degree from the University of Toulouse (1990), followed by a Ph.D. in 1992; his Ph.D. thesis, an analysis of mechanism design with multiple principals and asymmetric information, was written under Jean-Jacques Laffont. Later, in 1998, Martimort also earned his agrégation in economics. During his studies, he worked as a researcher at the National Institute for Agronomic Research and the Institut d'économie industrielle, of which he later became research director. After his agrégation, he held professorships at the University of Pau and Pays de l'Adour (1998-2000) and the University of Toulouse (2000–07), before joining the Ecole des Hautes Etudes en Sciences Sociales (EHESS), first at the Toulouse School of Economics (2007–10) and since 2010 at the Paris School of Economics (PSE). Moreover, since 2012, Martimort has been the associated chair of the PSE. He has or has had editorial duties with the Journal of the European Economic Association, Review of Economic Studies, Econometrica, International Journal of Industrial Organization, Journal of Economic Theory, RAND Journal of Economics, Theoretical Economics, and the Revue d'Economie Politique. His research has been recognized, among else, with the Economic Prize of the French Banking Association (1995), a junior membership in the Institut Universitaire de France (2002–07), the Best Young French Economist Award (2004), and fellowships in the European Economic Association and Econometric Society.

== Research ==
David Martimort's research interests include contract theory and mechanism design, public-private partnerships, and ("green") public procurement. In terms of research output, he ranks among the top 1% of economists registered on IDEAS/RePEc (January 2019).

=== Multiprincipal and common agency settings ===
One key idea in Martimort's research is the possibility of a common agent who contracts with multiple principals that each control one agent's activity. Martimort shows that in such a setting, the revelation principle fails to hold and only a weaker version - the equivalence principle - holds, with the results critically depending on the complementarity or substitutability of activities across principals. Martimort then applied multiprincipal incentive theory to supply chains, using it to explain why manufacturers' choice of common or exclusive retailers depends on the complementarity or substitutability of their brands, and government, where it is used to describe the shared control of entities by regulatory bodies as a set of competing contracts. Applying multi-principals and competing contracts to financial markets, Martimort, Bruno Biais and Jean-Charles Rochet develop a model that yields outcomes similar to those under imperfect competition, which however disappear as more competitors enter the market. Finally, in two studies with Lars Stole, Martimort shows that all common agency equilibria can be characterized by an extension of the taxation principle - the "delegation principle" - and how those equilibria are affected by direct externalities between principals under nonlinear price competition.

=== Collusion ===
Another fertile area of Martimort's research is collusion, which he extensively explored with Jean-Jacques Laffont. Among else, they show under which conditions a principal can offer agents who collude under asymmetric information implementable collusion-proof contracts and how these contracts depend on their (non-)anonymity. They also show how the problem of collusion between agents in centralized organizations critically depends on the presence of limits to agents' communication, which creates a conflict between agents' participation and coalition incentive constraints, that "the separation of powers in regulation may act as a commitment against the threat of regulatory capture", and how principals can design collusion-proof mechanisms when agents' valuations are correlated. Together with Antoine Faure-Grimaud, they also explore how the value of supervision with soft information depends on the tendency of supervisees and supervisors to collunder under asymmetric information, with centralized and decentralized settings resulting in the same outcome. Finally, Martimort and Denis Gromb study how to design optimal incentive contracts for experts in different collusion environments, with important implications for the organization of delegated expertise.

=== Regulatory agencies ===
In his research on regulatory institutions, Martimort argues that they create a framework for the repeated interactions between an interest group and a regulatory agency, and may mitigate the risk of regulatory capture depending on their time preferences, information and transaction costs. These general principles were then applied to the analysis of regulatory institutions in Latin America (with Antonio Estache).

=== Public-private partnerships ===
A more recent area in Martimort's research is the theory of public-private partnerships (PPPs). Together with Jerome Pouyet, Martimort analyzes whether the construction of public service infrastructure and the management of that infrastructure should be bundled or not, arguing that PPPs may be advantageous if there is a positive externality, the private benefits from asset ownership are not too large, and the risk of regulatory capture is limited. In subsequent research with Elisabeth Iossa, Martimort further extends the analysis of benefits and costs of public-private partnerships by allowing for asymmetric information, moral hazard, and renegotiations as well as private or public financing.

== Bibliography ==
- Laffont, J.-J., Martimort, D. (2009). The theory of incentives: the principal-agent model. Princeton: Princeton University Press.
