= H. Hugh Fudenberg =

American immunologist and immunogeneticist (1928–2014)

Herman Hugh Fudenberg
- Born: October 24, 1928; New York City, U.S.
- Died: March 15, 2014 (aged 85); Inman, South Carolina, U.S.
- Other name: Hugh Fudenberg
- Education: Boston University
- Known for: MMR vaccine controversy Anti-vaccine activism Autism-related pseudoscience
- Children: Drew Fudenberg
- Scientific career
- Fields: Immunology
- Workplaces: Rockefeller University, University of California, San Francisco
- Thesis: The "erythrocyte-coating substance" of "auto-immune" hemolytic disease. (1957)

Herman Hugh Fudenberg (October 24, 1928 – March 15, 2014) was an American clinical immunologist and founder of the NeuroImmuno Therapeutics Research Foundation (NITRF).

== Biography ==
He received his A.B. from UCLA in 1949 and his MD from the University of Chicago in 1953. Fudenberg received his M.A. in immunochemistry from Boston University in 1957.

The areas of his research, conducted primarily in the 1960s and 1970s, included research into immunoglobulin and receptors for this molecule in human monocytes, as well as the ability of red blood cells to, in vitro, form "rosette" formations around peripheral blood lymphocytes.

Fudenberg was hired by the Special Projects Unit of the Council for Tobacco Research in 1972, to study whether some people are genetically predisposed to emphysema. He initially found that up to 10% might be, and was planning on warning such people not to smoke tobacco, but his funding was cut off without explanation before he could do so. "They may have cut me off because it would have been negative for them," Fudenberg suggested.

He trained from 1954 to 1956 under William Dameshek, former editor of Blood and completed a residency at Peter Bent Brigham Hospital from 1956 to 1958. Fudenberg was a professor of medicine for 15 years (first associate, and later full) at University of California, San Francisco, as well as associate professor of immunology at the University of California, Berkeley. He was editor of the journal Clinical Immunology and Immunopathology for 15 years and developed the Rosette test as well. Additionally, Fudenberg sat on the World Health Organization's expert committee on immunology for 20 years. In 1974, he relocated to South Carolina, specifically the Medical University of South Carolina, where he remained as a professor until 1989.

Fudenberg was a proponent of the discredited hypothesis that there was a connection between the MMR vaccine and autism. In 1995 Fudenberg's medical license was suspended for improperly obtaining controlled substances.

== MMR vaccine and autism ==
In the 1980s Fudenberg began claiming that the MMR vaccine causes autism. The scientific consensus says that no evidence links the vaccine to the development of autism and that the vaccine's benefits greatly outweigh its risks. Fudenberg published his research in the fringe journal Biotherapy (now discontinued) in 1996, concluding that "Fifteen of the [True Autism] patients developed symptoms within a week after immunization with the [MMR] vaccine"; further asserting that "Fudenberg healed children, with a quarter 'fully normalised'." This paper was cited by Andrew Wakefield's fraudulent 1998 Lancet paper. The proposal of a vaccine-autism link has been called "the most damaging medical hoax of the last 100 years".

Fudenberg claimed in a 2004 interview with Brian Deer that he was able to cure autistic children using his own bone marrow. Fudenberg was a co-inventor of the autism "treatments" Wakefield obtained a patent for in 1997, and Wakefield stated the same year in a letter to the bursary of Royal Free Hospital's School of Medicine that he was waiting on a business plan from NITRF.

== Flu vaccine claims ==
In a 2005 episode of Larry King Live in which Bill Maher was being interviewed by Larry King, Maher argued that "if you have a flu shot for more than five years in a row, there's ten times the likelihood that you'll get Alzheimer's disease." This claim has been traced by David Gorski back to Fudenberg; Gorski noted that it appeared on what he called an "über-crank" website. Specifically, it appears Fudenberg made the claim when speaking at the 1st annual International Public Conference on Vaccination, held by the National Vaccine Information Center in Arlington, Virginia in 1997. The origin of the claim is unknown, as there is no study published in a peer-reviewed journal making such a claim. Furthermore, one study found that past exposure to influenza vaccines is associated with lower risk for Alzheimer's disease.

== License revocation ==
In 1995 Fudenberg's medical license was revoked. The Casewatch website states: "the South Carolina medical board found Fudenberg "guilty of engaging in dishonorable, unethical, or unprofessional conduct," fined him $10,000, ordered him to surrender his license to prescribe controlled substances (narcotic drugs), and placed his license on indefinite suspension." The board found that:

The Respondent admitted that he has on numerous occasions obtained controlled substances and legend drugs, namely, prosom, ambien, lasix, and potassium from a member of his office staff and others, and that he has unlawfully obtained these controlled substances for his own use, and has, in fact, used these medications.

In an interview with The Post and Courier, Fudenberg contended that "alcohol and opiate charges are completely false" and tried to attribute many of the problems to a former staff member at NITRF.

== Death ==
On March 15, 2014, Fudenberg died at the age of 85. He was survived by his four sons, including economist Drew Fudenberg.
