= Jean Tirole =

French economist (born 1953)

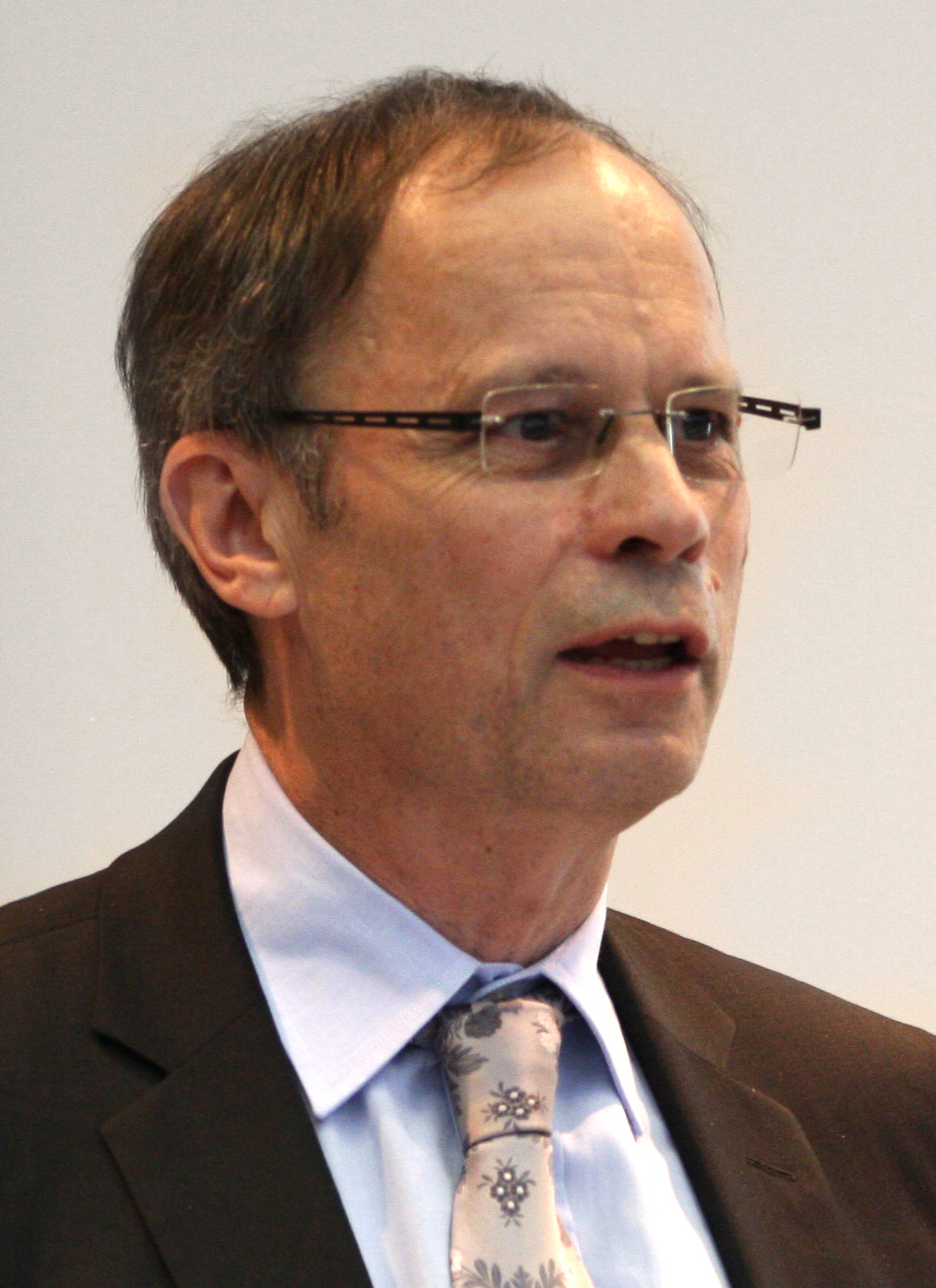
- Tirole in 2019
- Born: Jean Marcel Pierre Tirole; 9 August 1953 (age 73); Troyes, France

Academic background
- Education: Massachusetts Institute of Technology; Paris Dauphine University; École nationale des ponts et chaussées École Polytechnique
- Thesis: Essays in economic theory (1981)
- Doctoral advisor: Eric Maskin

Academic work
- Discipline: Microeconomics; Game theory; Industrial organization
- Institutions: Toulouse 1 University Capitole; Toulouse School of Economics; Ecole des hautes études en sciences sociales
- Doctoral students: Roland Bénabou
- Awards: John von Neumann Award (1998); BBVA Foundation Frontiers of Knowledge Award (2008); Erwin Plein Nemmers Prize in Economics (2014); Nobel Memorial Prize in Economics (2014)
- Website: Information at IDEAS / RePEc

Jean Marcel Pierre Tirole (French pronunciation: [ʒɑ̃ tiʁɔl]; born 9 August 1953) is a French economist who is currently a professor of economics at Toulouse 1 Capitole University. He focuses on industrial organization and game theory. In particular, he focuses on the regulation of economic activity in a way that does not hinder innovation while maintaining fair rules. Tirole's work is largely theoretical and explored in mathematical models, not empirical research.

In 2014, he received the Nobel Memorial Prize in Economic Sciences for his analysis of market power and regulation.

== Education ==
Tirole received engineering degrees from the École polytechnique in 1976, and from the École nationale des ponts et chaussées in 1978.

He was appointed a member of the elite Corps of Bridges, Waters and Forests, later completing graduate studies at Université Paris Dauphine; he received a DEA degree in 1976, and a Doctorat de troisième cycle in decision mathematics in 1978. He received a PhD in economics from the Massachusetts Institute of Technology in 1981, writing a thesis titled Essays in economic theory under the supervision of Eric Maskin.

He started thinking about studying economics when he was 21 years old, which he found both “very rigorous”, but at the same time “still a social science”. He said he found “a lot of that human aspect” in economics, which he found important.

== Career ==
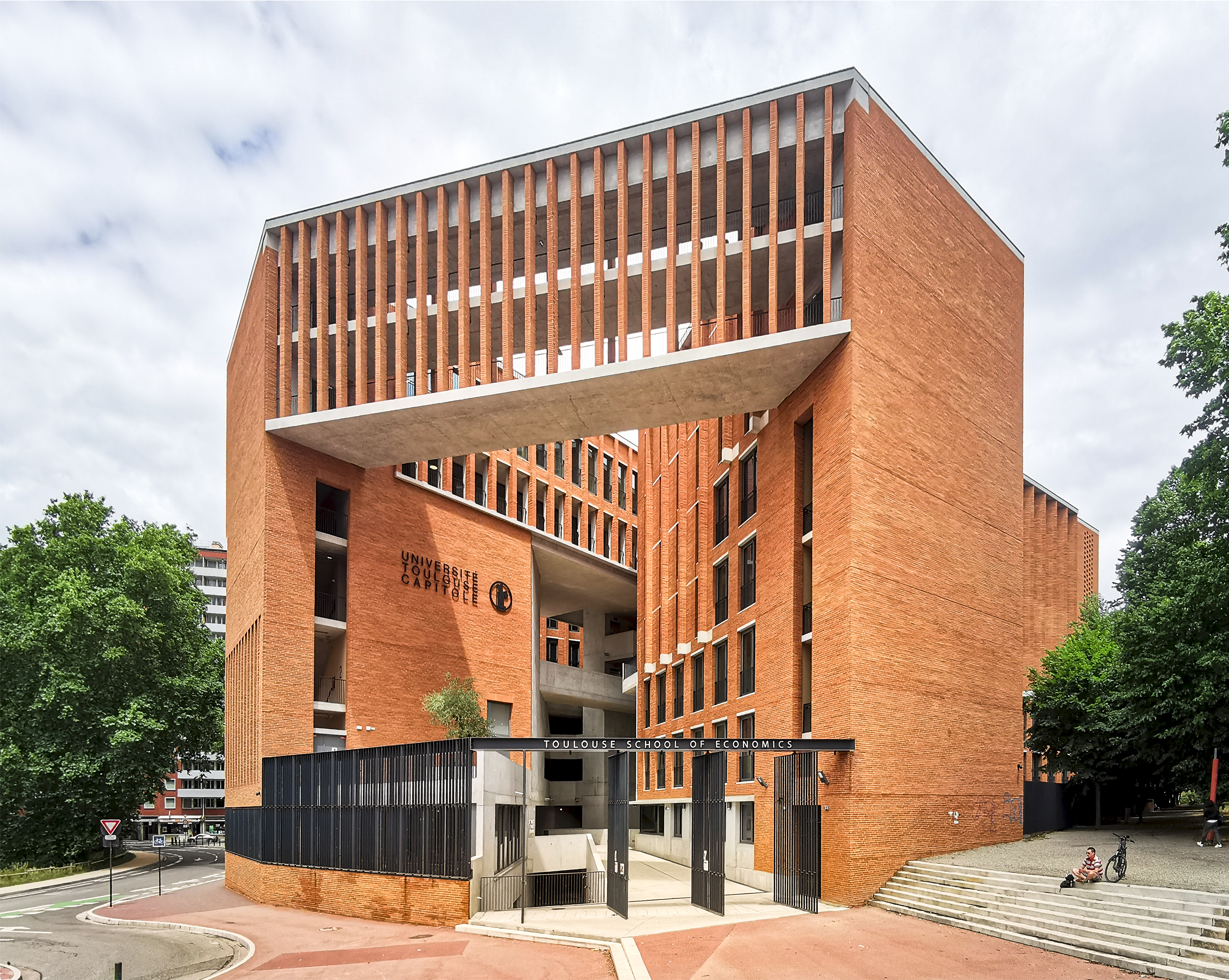
Toulouse School of Economics.

Tirole is chairman of the board of the Jean-Jacques Laffont Foundation at the Toulouse School of Economics, and scientific director of the Industrial Economics Institute (IDEI) at Toulouse 1 University Capitole. After receiving his doctorate from MIT in 1981, he worked as a researcher at the École nationale des ponts et chaussées until 1984. From 1984–1991, he was a professor of economics at MIT. His work by 1988 helped to define modern industrial organization theory by organising and synthesising the main results of the game-theory revolution vis-à-vis understanding of non-competitive markets.

From 1994 to 1996 he was a professor of economics at the École Polytechnique. Tirole was involved with Jean-Jacques Laffont in the project of creating a new School of Economics in Toulouse. He is Engineer General of the Corps of Bridges, Waters and Forests, Chair of the Board of the Toulouse School of Economics, and a visiting professor at MIT, and has been a professor "cumulant" at the École des hautes études en sciences sociales since 1995.

He was president of the Econometric Society in 1998 and of the European Economic Association in 2001. Around this time, he was able to determine a way to calculate the optimal prices for the regulation of natural monopolies and wrote a number of articles about the regulation of capital markets—with a focus on the differential of control between decentralised lenders and the centralised control of bank management. Tirole has been a member of the Académie des Sciences morales et politiques since 2011, the Conseil d'Analyse Économique since 2008 and the Conseil stratégique de la recherché since 2013. In the early 2010s, he showed that banks generally tend to take short-term risks and recommended a change in quantitative easing towards a more quality-based market stimulation policy.

== Contributions to economics ==
Tirole's textbook, The Theory of Industrial Organization, synthesised modern models of oligopolistic competition, analysing various cases where industries consist of a small number of firms with significant market power. He and Oliver Hart published a paper showing the conditions in which a vertical merger can result in foreclosure. Rochet and Tirole analysed the implications of 2-sided markets for competition policy. Fudenberg and Tirole also created a taxonomy of strategic effects in oligopolistic competition models.

=== The science of taming powerful firms ===
Tirole's 2014 Nobel Prize lecture was titled "The science of taming powerful firms" and explained his theories:

- Competition is rarely perfect. Markets can fail and market power (firms’ ability to raise prices far above costs and/or offer low quality) must be kept in check. The number of companies in an industry only provides a rough indication of whether the market is competitive. As each industry is unique in how competition works, regulators should take a case-by-case approach. To enable this, economists should develop an in-depth analysis of an industry that accounts for what regulators do and don't know (creating policies that do not require information unlikely to be held by regulators), and join policy discussions. Policy makers, in turn, need to listen to economists.
- Regulators must balance lowering prices for consumers with ensuring firms get a fair rate of return.

==== Monopolies in single-sided markets ====
- If a regulator forces an upstream monopoly to give all downstream operators "fair access" to their assets/services at the same price, this "fairness" can lead to consumers paying more than they should for less than they deserve. While downstream entities may compete "on a level playing field", the competition "dissipates" the profits that can be extracted from consumers. This results in low prices, however, these low downstream profits effectively cap the ability of the upstream firm to make a profit from its assets/services. Without the "fair access" restriction, the upstream firm would probably make mutually beneficial deals with selected downstream entities (e.g. by preferentially selling some better service to a higher bidding downstream operator). Thus, the upstream firm could use its exclusivity to give itself market power and profit from its asset/services.
- Whether the regulator tolerates preferential behaviour is a defacto regulation on the rate of return of the upstream asset/services.
- When an entity holds a monopoly, whether it should be allowed by regulators to get the benefit of its market power depends on whether it has achieved its monopoly fairly (e.g. due to its own risk taking, investment, innovation or efficiency) or unfairly (e.g. by “political connections, wrong market design, or sheer luck”).
  - Regulators can gain insight into whether market power was fairly acquired by looking at how companies acquired their assets (e.g. bidding on an auction) and whether their profits are tied to their own innovation/efficiency or factors out of their control. Regulators can gain further insight, despite firms having more information than regulators, by collecting data and benchmarking companies against similar companies operating in different markets. Regulators can also gain insight by auctioning monopoly rights because in auctions, firms reveal information about industry costs by competing with one another.
  - Secondly, regulators can force companies into a kind of fairness by offering options in how firms are contracted. A cost-plus contract shelters firms from fluctuations in costs but has a fixed rate of return, while a fixed price contract makes firms take responsibility for costs (and incentivises lowering costs), but potentially offers a large windfall if costs can be minimised. However, with the latter there is the risk that firms will earn the windfall when costs turn out to be low for other reasons that have nothing to do with the efforts of the firm. An inefficient firm will prefer a cost-plus contract, and efficient firm will opt for a fixed price contract.
    - However, the fixed price contract, in making the firm responsible for costs, incentivises skimping on quality. Powerful incentives to reduce prices must go hand in hand with more thorough monitoring of quality.
    - The fixed price contract may also generate a high profit, which regulators may perceive via the information they now have. Regulators should not try to take these profits, even if encouraged by public opinion, as it destroys a firm's incentives to reduce costs.
    - Thus, powerful incentives requires commitment and an independent regulatory agency protected from the pressure of public opinion.

==== Intellectual property as an example of monopoly issues in regulation ====
- In Intellectual property, regulators can lack information because ideas may take time to hit the ground and run.
- Technologies may require many different patents, and as the price of each patent stacks, the whole may become prohibitive to entities. One feature is patent pools, where patent owners lot their patents together for a discount, benefiting both patent users and intellectual property owners. However, patent pools, and more generally co-marketing, may also allow owners to raise prices. If two patent holders of similar patents collude to raise prices, there may be no lower-priced patent that performs the same function.
- Unfortunately, regulators don’t possess the relevant information to ban price-raising patent pools while allowing price-lowering ones. Simple approaches may be best:
  - ensuring that patents can be individually licensed outside the pool, ensures patents compete with the pool and thus only price-lowering pools survive.
  - Unbundling - where users can buy individual licences from the pool, not just the whole pool, and the pool price is the sum of individual licences.
- In many cases there are multiple routes to solving a technological problem, and each may be equally viable, however a standard-setting body may chose only one avenue to pursue. This may make some intellectual property a “standard essential patent” because users have to use that patent to meet the standard, and that patent can then ask for monopoly price.
- To restrain firms from taking advantage of this good fortune, standard setting committees require firms to agree in advance to license their patent on fair reasonable and non-discriminating terms. But what does “fair and reasonable rate” mean? People will not innovate without knowing what return they might get.
- Economists have proposed that intellectual property owners commit to licensing conditions prior to the choice of standard, but this doesn’t happen very often. Why?

==== Two-sided markets ====
- A two-sided market is where a central entity is beneficial to sellers and their buyers (e.g. a marketplace on which people buy and sell, a videogame console which developers make games for and player play games on, streaming services where advertisers advertise to watchers, money cards which buyers use to purchase from merchants).
- The central platform will probably give a discount to the side that is most useful to the other side -- e.g. a social media platform might be free to users but charge advertisers, because the users are useful to the advertisers.
- This results in skewed pricing structures. One side may enjoy the central platform for free (or even receive payments like frequent flyer miles for using the platform), while the other side is heavily charged.
- A regulator without a full understanding of two-sided markets might complain about predation on the low-price side or excessive pricing on the high price side, despite the fact such pricing structures are practised even by small firms.

==== General principles of regulation ====
- Regulation stops high market power from becoming high prices. But regulators have frequently not only set rules around price level, but also price structure. There regulators also face an information handicap, and the need for intervention is less obvious than in the case of the price level. Market power might dictate a desire for higher prices, but less so unfair price structures. Any regulation of price structure must be based on rigorous analysis and justification. Regulators have previously set price structures when they feared they lacked the information to set prices properly, however these were very inefficient price structures. But if the regulator can make use of decentralised information, a global price cap instead creates powerful incentives for a firm to be cost-efficient but also choose an efficient price structure.
- Instead of trying to monitor that companies are doing right all the time, regulators should create incentives for companies to monitor themselves.
- Regulators may want to cap prices, but price caps require companies to have low costs. Companies that cannot reduce costs may reduce quality instead. Since the regulator does not have the internal information of how much a company can reduce costs to set price caps, it is better off offering companies the option of a price cap or a cost-share with the regulator, as price caps will be preferred by companies that can reduce costs and cost-share will be preferred by ones that cannot.

== Awards ==
Tirole was awarded the Nobel Memorial Prize in Economic Sciences in 2014 for his analysis of market power and the regulation of natural monopolies.

Tirole has also received:

- Doctorates honoris causa from the Université libre de Bruxelles in 1989, the London Business School and the University of Montreal in 2007, the University of Mannheim in 2011, the Athens University of Economics and Business and the University of Rome Tor Vergata in 2012, the University of Lausanne in 2013, as well as the Prague University of Economics and Business in 2022.
- The "Prix Claude Levi-Strauss" in 2010.
- The Chicago Mercantile Exchange – Mathematical Sciences Research Institute (CME-MSRI) prize in Innovative Quantitative Innovations in Finance in 2010
- The Tjalling Koopmans Asset Award (Tilburg University) in 2010
- Outstanding Contributions to the Profession Award (International Association for Energy Economics) in 2009.
- The inaugural BBVA Foundation Frontiers of Knowledge Award in the Economics, Finance and Management category in 2008.
- The Prix du Cercle d'Oc in 2008.
- The Gold Medal (French: médaille d'or) of the French CNRS in 2007.
- The Gold Medal of the city of Toulouse in 2007
- The Public Utility Research Center Distinguished Service Award (University of Florida) in 1997.
- The Yrjö Jahnsson Award of the Yrjö Jahnsson Foundation and the European Economic Association in 1993.

He has also been a Sloan Research Fellow (1985) and a Guggenheim Fellow (1988). He was a fellow of the Econometric Society in 1986. He is a foreign honorary member of the American Academy of Arts and Sciences (1993) and of the American Economic Association (1993), and an Economic Theory Fellow (Society for the Advancement of Economic Theory) since 2011. In 2013 Tirole was elected an Honorary Fellow of the Royal Society of Edinburgh.

He is among the most influential economists in the world according to IDEAS/RePEc. Besides his numerous academic distinctions, he is a Commander of the Légion d'honneur since 2025 and an Officer of the Ordre national du Mérite since 2010.

== Publications ==
Tirole has published about 200 professional articles in economics and finance, as well as 10 books, including The Theory of Industrial Organization, Game Theory (with Drew Fudenberg), A Theory of Incentives in Procurement and Regulation (with Jean-Jacques Laffont), The Prudential Regulation of Banks (with Mathias Dewatripont), Competition in Telecommunications (with Jean-Jacques Laffont), Financial Crises, Liquidity, and the International Monetary System, and The Theory of Corporate Finance. His research covers industrial organization, regulation, game theory, public economics, banking and finance, psychology and economics, international finance and macroeconomics.

=== Books ===
- Dynamic Models of Oligopoly (with D. Fudenberg), 1986.
- The Theory of Industrial Organization, MIT Press, 1988. Description and chapter-preview links.
- Dynamic Models of Oligopoly (avec Drew Fudenberg, Harwood Academic Publishers GMbH, 1986.
- Game Theory (with D. Fudenberg), MIT Press, 1991.
- A Theory of Incentives in Regulation and Procurement (with J.-J. Laffont), MIT Press,1993. Description & chapter-preview links.
- The Prudential Regulation of Banks (with M. Dewatripont), MIT Press,1994.
- Competition in Telecommunications, MIT Press, 1999.
- Financial Crises, Liquidity and the International Monetary System, Princeton University Press, 2002.
- The Theory of Corporate Finance, Princeton University Press, 2005. Description. Association of American Publishers 2006 Award for Excellence.
- Balancing the Banks (with Mathias Dewatripont, and Jean-Charles Rochet), Princeton University Press, 2010.
- Inside and Outside Liquidity (with Bengt Holmström), MIT Press, 2011.
- Théorie de l'organisation industrielle, Economica, 2015
- Économie du bien commun, Presses universitaires de France, 2016
- Economics for the common good, Princeton University Press; 2017

Awards
Preceded by Eugene F. Fama; Lars Peter Hansen; Robert J. Shiller	Laureate of the Nobel Memorial Prize in Economics; 2014	Succeeded by Angus Deaton
