= Drew Fudenberg =

American economist (born 1957)

- Born: March 2, 1957 (age 69); New York City, US
- Relatives: Hugh Fudenberg (father)

Academic background
- Education: Harvard University; Massachusetts Institute of Technology
- Doctoral advisor: Eric Maskin

Academic work
- Discipline: Game theory, General equilibrium Theory
- Institutions: MIT
- Doctoral students: Matthew Rabin; Glenn Ellison; Sendhil Mullainathan; Muriel Niederle
- Notable ideas: learning in games, Folk theorem
- Awards: Guggenheim Fellowship, 1990; Fellow of the American Academy of Arts and Sciences
- Website: Information at IDEAS / RePEc

Drew Fudenberg (born March 2, 1957) is a professor of economics at the Massachusetts Institute of Technology. His research spans many aspects of game theory, including equilibrium theory, learning in games, evolutionary game theory, and many applications to other fields. Fudenberg was also one of the first to apply game theoretic analysis in industrial organization, bargaining theory, and contract theory. He has also authored papers on repeated games, reputation effects, and behavioral economics.

== Biography ==
Fudenberg obtained his A.B. in applied mathematics from Harvard University in 1978, when he went on to obtain his Ph.D. in Economics from the Massachusetts Institute of Technology. After completing his Ph.D. in just three years, he began his assistant professorship at the University of California, Berkeley in 1981. At Berkeley, Fudenberg was tenured at the age of 28. In 1987, he returned to a faculty position at MIT, where he taught for 6 years. In 1993, Fudenberg accepted a faculty position in the Economics department of his alma mater, Harvard University. He has returned once more to MIT as the Paul A. Samuelson Professor of Economics as of 2016.

Fudenberg was the associate editor of the Journal of Economic Theory from 1984 to 1996; the Quarterly Journal of Economics from 1984 to 1989; Econometrica from 1985 to 1996; Games and Economic Behavior from 1988 to 1993, and the foreign editor of the Review of Economic Studies from 1993 to 1996. He was also the principal editor of Econometrica from 1996 until 2000.

Fudenberg has authored a number of books on game theory, including Game Theory with Jean Tirole, a primary reference for graduate students in economics; Dynamic Models of Oligopoly, also with Jean Tirole; and Theory of Learning in Games with David K. Levine.

Fudenberg received the Guggenheim Fellowship in 1990 and became a fellow of the American Academy of Arts and Sciences in 1998.

He is the son of immunologist and anti-vaccination activist Hugh Fudenberg.

== Publications ==
- Game Theory (co-authored with Jean Tirole)
- Dynamic Models of Oligopoly (co-authored with Jean Tirole)
- A Long-Run Collaboration on Long-Run Games (co-authored with David K. Levine)
- Theory of Learning in Games (co-authored with David K. Levine)

Academic offices
Preceded by Eddie Dekel	President of the Econometric Society; 2017–2018	Succeeded by Tim Besley
