= Jean-Jacques Laffont =

French economist

- Born: April 13, 1947; Toulouse, France
- Died: May 1, 2004 (aged 57); Colomiers, France

Academic work
- Discipline: Microeconomics
- Institutions: University of Southern California; University of Toulouse; École Polytechnique
- Notable ideas: Public economics disequilibrium econometrics Information econometrics, especially asymmetry
- Awards: Yrjö Jahnsson Award (1993)
- Scientific career
- Education: University of Toulouse, Harvard University
- Thesis: Essays in economics of uncertainty: information acquisition and instrument-dependent randomness (1975)
- Doctoral advisor: Kenneth Arrow; Jerry R. Green
- Doctoral students: Roger Guesnerie; Gilbert Aké; David Martimort
- Website: Information at IDEAS / RePEc

Jean-Jacques Marcel Laffont (April 13, 1947 – May 1, 2004) was a French economist specializing in public economics and information economics. Educated at the University of Toulouse and the Ecole Nationale de la Statistique et de l'Administration Economique (ENSAE) in Paris, he was awarded PhD in economics by Harvard University in 1975.

Laffont taught at the École Polytechnique (1975–1987), and was Professor of Economics at Ecole des hautes études en sciences sociales (1980–2004) and at the University of Toulouse I (1991–2001). In 1991, he founded Toulouse's Industrial Economics Institute (Institut D'Economie Industrielle, IDEI) which has become one of the most prominent European research centres in economics. From 2001 until his death, he was the inaugural holder of the University of Southern California's John Elliott Chair in Economics. Over the course of his career, he wrote 17 books and more than 200 articles. Had he lived, he might well have shared the 2014 Nobel Prize for Economics awarded to his colleague and collaborator Jean Tirole.

== Contribution to economics ==
Laffont made pioneering contributions in microeconomics, in particular, public economics, development economics, and the theory of imperfect information, incentives, and regulation. His 1993 book A Theory of Incentives in Procurement and Regulation, written with Jean Tirole, is a fundamental reference in the economics of the public sector and the theory of regulation. In 2002, he published (with David Martimort) The Theory of Incentives: the Principal-Agent Model, a treatise on the economics of information and incentives. His last book, Regulation and Development, discussed policies for improving the economies of less developed countries.

== Death ==
Jean-Jacques Laffont was diagnosed with cancer in autumn 2002 and died of the disease at his home in Colomiers in the Haute Garonne region of southern France on May 1, 2004. He was survived by his wife, Colette; his daughters Cécile, Bénédicte and Charlotte; and his son, Bertrand.

== Awards and honors ==
- Wells Prize, awarded biannually by Harvard University to the best Ph.D. thesis in economics (1975);
- CNRS Silver Medal (1990);
- Scientific Prize of the UAP (1991);
- Honorary Member of the American Economic Association (1991);
- Senior member of the Institut Universitaire de France, which honors the best research professors in France in all disciplines (1991–2001);
- Foreign Honorary Member of the American Academy of Arts and Sciences (1993);
- Best economist of the year award from the Nouvel Economiste magazine (1993);
- (with Jean Tirole, Scientific Director of IDEI), the Yrjö Jahnsson Award from the Yrjö Jahnsson Foundation and the European Economic Association, awarded biennially to the best European economist under the age of 45 (1993);
- Member of the Economic Advisory Council of the Prime Minister of France (1997);
- Honorary doctorate from the University of Lausanne (1998);
- Officer of the French Legion of Honor.

== Selected publications ==
=== Books ===
- Laffont, Jean-Jacques (1979). Aggregation and revelation of preferences. Amsterdam New York New York: North-Holland Publishing Co. sole distributors for the U.S.A. and Canada, Elsevier North-Holland. ISBN 9780444853264.
- Laffont, Jean-Jacques (1988). Fundamentals of Public Economics. Cambridge, Massachusetts: MIT Press. ISBN 9780262121279.
- Laffont, Jean-Jacques; Tirole, Jean (1993). A theory of incentives in procurement and regulation. Cambridge, Massachusetts: MIT Press. ISBN 9780262121743.
- Laffont, Jean-Jacques (2000). Incentives and Political Economy (Clarendon Lectures in Economics). Oxford, UK New York: Oxford University Press. ISBN 9780198294245.
- Laffont, Jean-Jacques; Martimort, David (2002). The theory of incentives: the principal-agent model. Princeton, New Jersey: Princeton University Press. ISBN 9780691091846.
- Laffont, Jean-Jacques (2005). Regulation and development. Cambridge, UK New York: Cambridge University Press. ISBN 9780521549486.

=== Chapters in books ===
- Laffont, Jean-Jacques (2008), ""externalities" (definition)", in Durlauf, Steven N.; Blume, Lawrence E. (eds.), The new Palgrave dictionary of economics (2nd ed.), Basingstoke, Hampshire New York: Palgrave Macmillan, ISBN 9780333786765 Direct link.
