= Industrial Economics Institute =

Research center in economics

Coordinates: 43.6053°N 1.432°E

The industrial economics institute' (French: Institut d'Économie Industrielle) (IDEI) is a research center in economics located in Toulouse (France) within the Toulouse 1 University Capitole. It was founded in 1990 by Jean-Jacques Laffont. The IDEI serves a dual purpose: allowing the University of Toulouse I to be competitive at an international level; providing administrations and companies with an interface between their activities and economic research.

IDEI tackles both theoretical and applied economic problems and supplies state-of-the-art tools developed by economic research to decision-makers in eight research areas:

- Industrial Organization, Regulation and Competition Policy
- Innovation and Intellectual Property
- Insurance, Banking and Finance
- Energy, Environment, Agriculture
- Macroeconomics, Growth and International Economics
- Economics of Developing Countries and in Transition Countries
- Methodology: Econometrics, Statistics and Economic Theory
- Public Economics, Health, Labour and Education

The department is particularly well known for its work in industrial organization and in the economics of information. Among the department's prominent faculty are the economists Jean Tirole and Jacques Crémer.

The IDEI also hosts the MPSE (Midi Pyrénées Sciences Economiques) graduate school of economics that recruits the ablest students from all countries in the European Union and further afield.
