= European Forest Institute =

European international organization

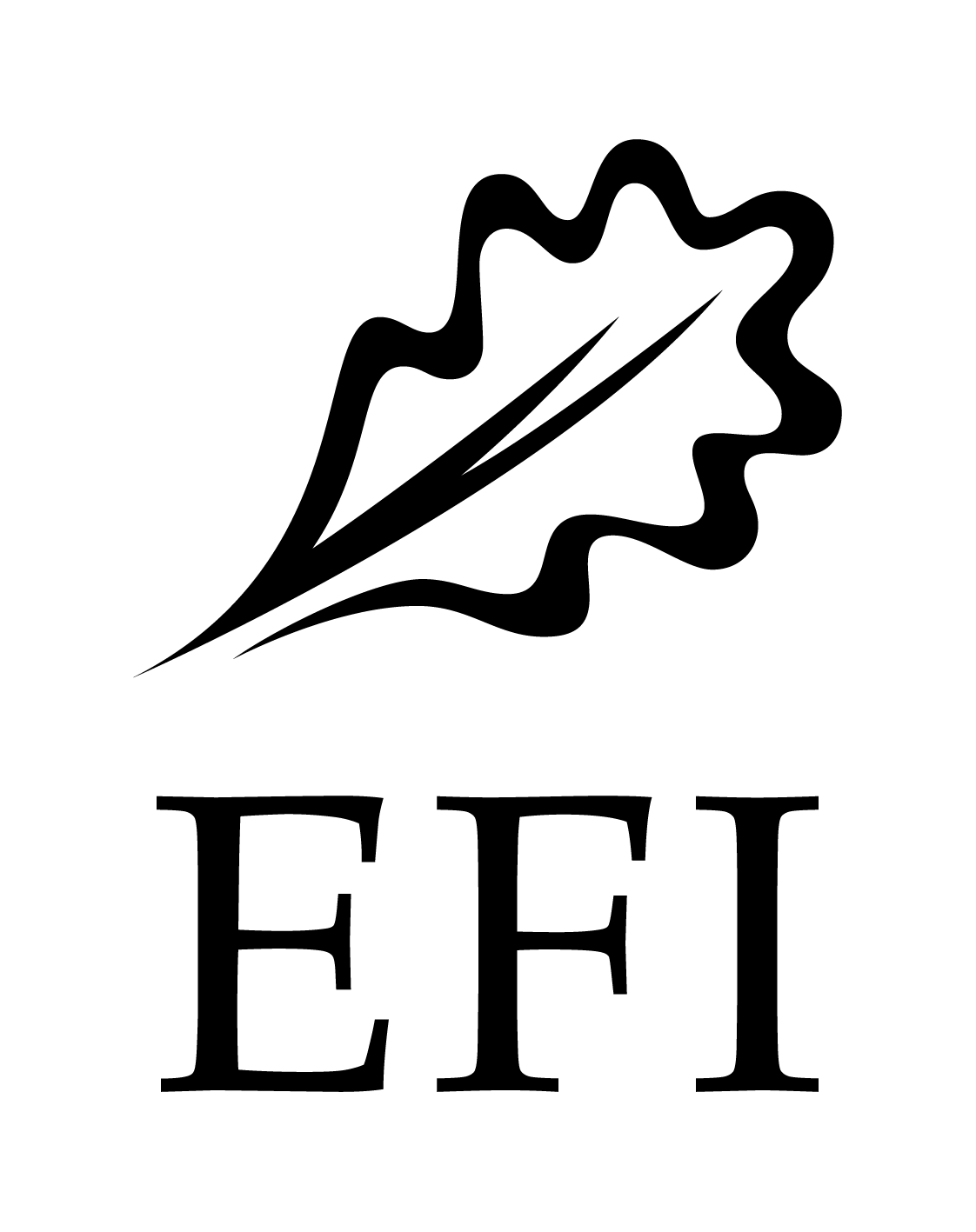
- Formation: 1993 as a NGO and 2005 as an international organization
- Headquarters: Joensuu, Finland
- Members: 30 member states
- EFI Director: Robert Mavsar
- Website: efi.int

The European Forest Institute (EFI) is an international organization established by a number of European states. It has 30 member countries, and about 130 member organizations from 40 countries working in diverse research fields.

== Organization ==
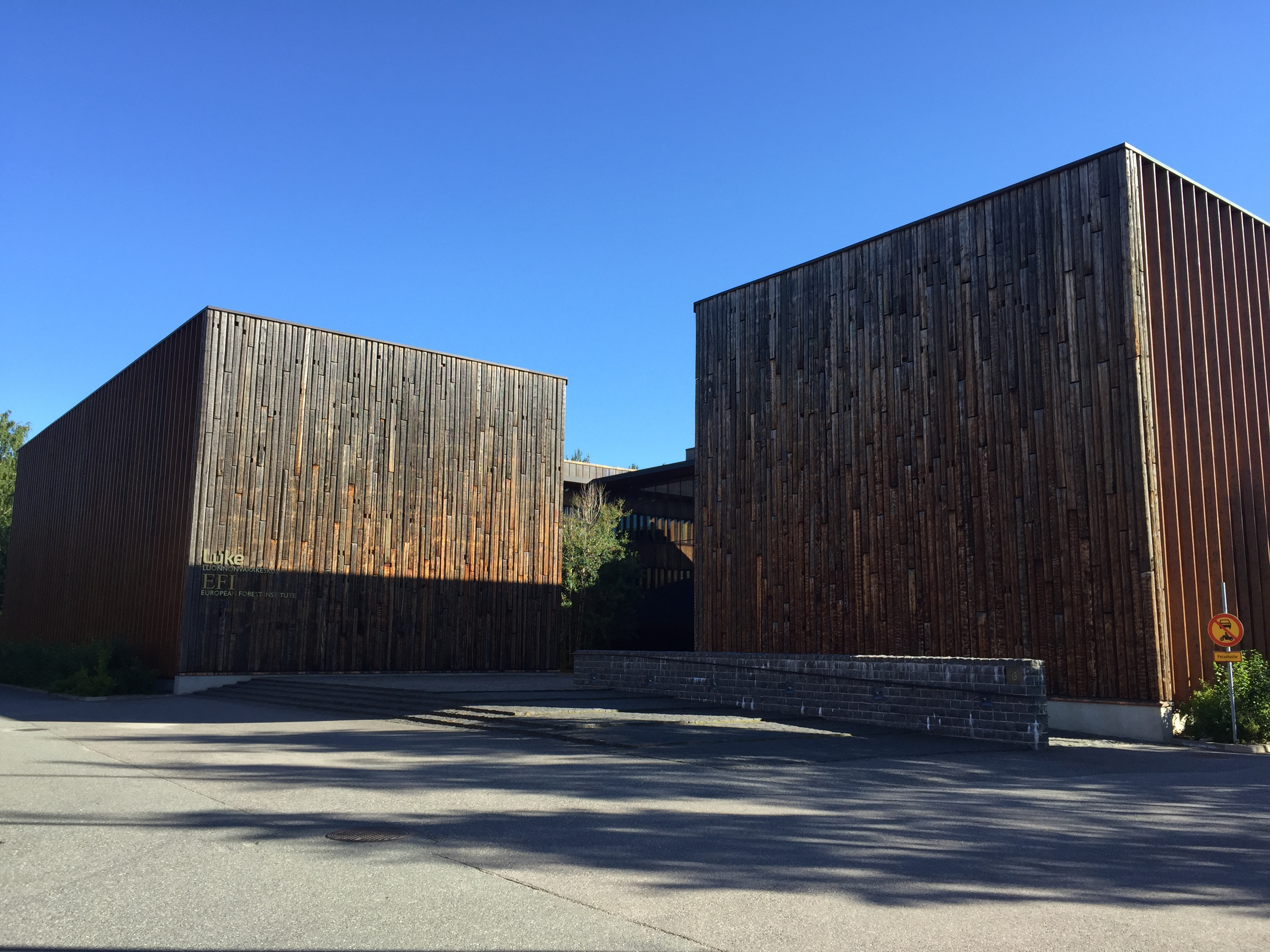
EFI headquarters in Joensuu, Finland

=== Places and staff ===
EFI's headquarters is located in Joensuu, Finland, and also has offices in Barcelona, Bonn and Brussels as well as an Asia Regional Office in Malaysia. It employs a staff of over 100.

=== Member states ===
The Convention on the European Forest Institute has been ratified by total of 30 European countries by the spring of 2022, namely Austria, Belgium, Bulgaria, Croatia, Czech Republic, Denmark, Estonia, Finland, France, Germany, Greece, Ireland, Italy, Latvia, Lithuania, Luxembourg, Netherlands, Norway, Poland, Portugal, Romania, Serbia, Slovak Republic, Slovenia, Spain, Sweden, Switzerland, Turkey, Ukraine and the United Kingdom. These countries each have a seat in the highest decision-making body in EFI's organisation, the council.

=== Associate and affiliate members ===
EFI currently has approximately 130 member organisations from more than 40 countries. The benefits of associate and affiliate membership include voting rights for important decisions, access to the EFI network, news and announcements related to European forest research, visibility on the EFI website, and opportunity to receive EFI publications and publish announcements in various EFI channels.

== Activities ==
EFI provides policy support on forest-related issues. Further, it facilitate and stimulates forest related networking as well as promotes the supply of unbiased and policy relevant information on forests and forestry. It also advocates for forest research and for scientifically sound information as a basis for policy-making on forests.
