= The RAND Journal of Economics =

- Discipline: Economics
- Language: English

Publication details
- Former name(s): The Bell Journal of Economics and Management Science, The Bell Journal of Economics
- History: 1970-present
- Publisher: Wiley-Blackwell on behalf of the RAND Corporation (United States)
- Frequency: Quarterly
- Impact factor: 1.986 (2020)

Standard abbreviations
- ISO 4: RAND J. Econ.

Indexing
- ISSN: 0741-6261
- JSTOR: 07416261
- Bell Journal
- ISSN: 0361-915X

Links
- Journal homepage; Journal page at publisher's website; Online archive

The RAND Journal of Economics (usually called RAND Journal or simply Rand) is a quarterly peer-reviewed academic journal of economics published by Wiley-Blackwell on behalf of the RAND Corporation. It publishes theoretical and empirical papers on industrial organization and related topics. According to the Journal Citation Reports, the journal has a 2020 impact factor of 1.986.

== History ==
The journal was established in 1970 by AT&T's Bell Labs economics group as The Bell Journal of Economics and Management Science. From 1975 to 1983 it was titled The Bell Journal of Economics. In 1984, after transfer to the RAND Corporation, it acquired its present name.

== See also ==
- List of economics journals
