= Beverly J. Silver =

American academic

Beverly Judith Silver

Academic background
- Education: PhD
- Alma mater: State University of New York at Binghamton
- Thesis: Labor Unrest and Capital Accumulation on a World Scale (1992)
- Doctoral advisor: Terence Hopkins
- Other advisors: Immanuel Wallerstein, Melvyn Dubofsky

Beverly J. Silver (born 1957) is an American scholar of labor and development whose work has been translated into over twelve languages. She is a professor of Sociology at the Johns Hopkins University in Baltimore, Maryland.

== Training and academic career ==
Silver grew up in Detroit during a period of intense working-class struggle. She was active in the United Farm Workers Union and the solidarity campaigns for Chile. Silver received her B.A. in economics from Barnard College and her Ph.D. from SUNY Binghamton, where she was part of the Fernand Braudel Center for the Study of Economies, Historical Systems, and Civilizations. During this time she collaborated with a number of scholars including Giovanni Arrighi, Immanuel Wallerstein, and Terence Hopkins and contributed to the development of the school of world-systems analysis. For many years she was a member of the World Labor Research Group at the Fernand Braudel Center at Binghamton.

== Publications ==
=== Books ===
- Corey R. Payne, Roberto Patricio Korzeniewicz, and Beverly J. Silver. (2022). World-Systems Analysis at a Critical Juncture. Routledge.
- Silver, Beverly J.; Forces of Labor: Workers' Movements and Globalization since 1870 (2003), and since translated into Chinese, Korean, German, Polish, Portuguese, Italian and Spanish.
- Silver, Beverly J. & Arrighi, Giovanni; Chaos and Governance in the Modern World-System (1999).
- Silver, Beverly J., Arrighi, Giovanni and Dubofsky, Melvyn, editors; "Labor Unrest in the World-Economy, 1870-1990", special issue of Review (Fernand Braudel Center), vol. 18, no. 1, Winter, 1995, pages 1–206.

=== Journal articles and book chapters ===
- Corey R. Payne & Beverly J. Silver. (2022). “Domination Without Hegemony and the Limits of US World Power,” Political Power and Social Theory. Vol. 39: 159-177.
- Beverly J. Silver & Corey R. Payne, “Crises of World Hegemony and the Speeding Up of Social History” chapter 1 in Hegemony and World Order, editors P. Dutkiewicz et al, Routledge, 2020
- Beverly J. Silver, "'Plunges Into Utter Destruction' and the Limits of Historical Capitalism". Capitalism in Transformation, editors R. Atzmüller et al, Edward Elgar Publishing, 2019.
- Beverly J. Silver, “Afterword Reflections on Capitalist Development in Hostile Environments”, Journal of Agrarian Change. 2019: 19:569-576.
- Sahan Savas Karatasli & Sefika Kumral & Daniel Pasciuti & Beverly J. Silver, 2017. "World Hegemonies and Global Inequalities," in: Mapping a New World Order, pages 23-37. Edward Elgar Publishing.
- Beverly J. Silver and Sahan Savas Karatasli, "Historical Dynamics of Capitalism and Labor Movements" in The Oxford Handbook of Social Movements, edited by Donatella Della Porta and Mario Diani, 2015.
- Beverly Silver, "Labour, War and World Politics Contemporary Dynamics in World-Historical Perspective" in Handbook of International Political Economy of Production (editor Kees van der Pilj) Edward Elgar, 2015.
- Beverly Silver, "Theorizing the Working Class in Twenty-First Century Global Capitalism" in Workers and Labour in a Globalised Capitalism: Contemporary Themes and Theoretical Issues (editor: Maurizio Atzeni) Palgrave Macmillan, 2013.
- Beverly J. Silver and Giovanni Arrighi, "End of the Long Twentieth Century" in Craig Calhoun and Geogi Derluguian (eds). Business as Usual: The Roots of the Global Financial Meltdown. New York University Press, New York, 2011.
- Beverly J. Silver and Lu Zhang, China as an Emerging Epicenter of World Labor Unrest in Ho-fung Hung ed. China and the Transformation of Global Capitalism. 2009.
- Arrighi, Giovanni; Silver Beverly J. and Brewer, Benjamin D.; “Industrial Convergence and the Persistence of the North-South Income Divide: A Rejoinder”, Studies in Comparative International Development, vol. 40, no. 1, Spring 2005.
- Arrighi, Giovanni; Silver, Beverly J. and Brewer, Benjamin D.; “Response”, Studies in Comparative International Development, 38, 1, Spring, 2003, 39–42
- Arrighi, Giovanni; Silver, Beverly J. and Brewer, Benjamin D.; “Industrial Convergence, Globalization, and the Persistence of the North-South Divide”, Studies in Comparative International Development, 38, 1, Spring, 2003, 3–31
- Arrighi Giovanni and Silver, Beverly J.; “Capitalism and World (Dis)Order”, Review of International Studies, 27, December, 2001, 961–983
- Silver, Beverly J.; “Labor Upsurges: From Detroit to Ulsan and Beyond”, Critical Sociology, vol. 31, no. 3, pages 439–452, 2005.
- Silver, Beverly J.; “Labor, Globalization and World Politics”, in Critical Globalization Studies, edited by Richard Appelbaum and William Robinson, Routledge Press, 2005
- Silver, Beverly J.; “Labor, War and World Politics: Contemporary Dynamics in Historical Perspective”, in Labour and New Social Movements in a Globalizing World System, edited by Berthold Unfried, Marcel van der Linden and Christine Schindler (ITH, vol. 38), Akademische Verlagsanstalt, Leipzig, 2004
- Silver, Beverly J.; “Rejoinder”, response to Symposium of Reviews of Beverly J. Silver's "Forces of Labor: Workers’ Movements and Globalization Since 1870", in In Critical Solidarity (American Sociological Association), Winter 2003 Reprinted in Debate, (South Africa), Spring 2004
- Silver, Beverly J.and Arrighi, Giovanni; “Polanyi’s ‘Double Movement’: The Belle Époques of U.S. and British World Hegemony Compared”, Politics and Society, June 2003
- Silver, Beverly J. and Arrighi, Giovanni; “Workers North and South” in Leo Panitch and Colin Leys, editors, Socialist Register 2001 (Theme: Working Classes, Global Realities). London: Merlin Press, 2000, 51–74
- Silver, Beverly J. : “Arbeiterbewegung, Globalisierung und Weltpolitik: Dynamik der Gegenwart in welthistorischer Sicht", in: Jahrbuch für Forschungen zur Geschichte der Arbeiterbewegung, No. I/2004 (German Language).

=== Scholarly acclaim for Forces of Labor ===
Forces of Labor won the highest book award in 2005 from the American Sociological Association, the Distinguished Scholarly Publication Award.
