= Terence Hopkins =

American historical sociologist (1928–1997)

- Born: Terence Kilbourne Hopkins; 1928
- Died: January 3, 1997 (aged 68–69)
- Occupation: Historical sociologist

Academic background
- Education: Columbia University
- Doctoral advisor: Karl Polanyi

Terence Kilbourne Hopkins (1928 – January 3, 1997) was an American historical sociologist who collaborated with Immanuel Wallerstein, Giovanni Arrighi and others on world systems theory. Among world systems scholars, he was "considered the specialist [...] on all methodological questions".

== Life ==
Hopkins gained a PhD in sociology in Columbia University, where he taught from 1958 to 1968. He worked there in a research group led by Karl Polanyi. From 1968 to 1970, he was visiting professor at the University of the West Indies in Trinidad. In 1970, he founded a graduate program in sociology at Binghamton University and taught there until retirement in 1995. He helped found the Fernand Braudel Center at Binghamton. On the occasion of his retirement, his students came from all over the world to hold a celebration conference; it was published as Mentoring, Methods, and Movements, highlighting his central contributions. Hopkins argued that the standard Marxist interpretation of class formation and state formation needed to be reworked, Christopher Chase-Dunn wrote.

== Works ==
- The Exercise of Influence in Small Groups, 1964
- (ed. with Immanuel Wallerstein) Processes of the World-system, 1979
- (with Immanuel Wallerstein) World-systems Analysis: Theory and Methodology, 1982
- (ed. with Immanuel Wallerstein) The Age of Transition: Trajectory of the World-system 1945–2025, 1996
