= Georgi Derluguian =

American sociologist

- Георгий Дерлугьян
- Born: 25 October 1961 (age 64); Krasnodar, Russian SSR, Soviet Union
- Education: Binghamton University (PhD, 1995); Soviet Academy of Sciences (PhD, 1990); Moscow State University (1985)
- Occupations: sociologist and academic
- Employer: NYU Abu Dhabi
- Notable work: Bourdieu's Secret Admirer in the Caucasus

Georgi Matveyevich Derluguian (Note: Russian: Георгий Матвеевич Дерлугьян, romanized: Georgy Matveyevich Derlugyan) (born 25 October 1961, also known as Gevorg Martiros Derlugian) (Note: Armenian: Գևորգ Մարտիրոս Դերլուգյան, romanized: Geworg Martiros Derlowgyan) is a sociologist and historian of Armenian, Russian and Ukrainian descent. His area of specialty is in ethnic violence, guerrilla movements and revolutions, particularly in the Caucasus, Central Asia and Africa, as well as post-Cold War globalization. He is currently a professor of Social Research and Public Policy at New York University Abu Dhabi.

== Background ==
Derluguian was born in Krasnodar, in the North Caucasus. His paternal grandfather was an ethnic Armenian born in Artvin (modern-day Turkey), which had been annexed by the Russian Empire after the Russo-Turkish War. He moved to Russia to work on a farm, where he met and married a Russian girl, who returned with him to Artvin. After the 1921 Treaty of Kars returned Artvin to Turkey, they moved to the Donbas village of Yenakiyevo where Derluguian's father, Matvei (Martiros) Martirosovich Derlugyan, was born. Derluguian's mother, Yekaterina Kondratyevna Tarasenko, was born in the village of Starovelichkovskaya, Krasnodar Krai to a family of Kuban Cossacks. Derluguian grew up with his maternal grandmother, who spoke only Ukrainian.

== Education and career ==
Derluguian studied at the Institute of Asian and African Studies at Moscow State University from 1978 to 1985, graduating with a master's degree in African studies with a focus on the modern history of Mozambique. He studied Portuguese, English and Xhosa languages. In the 1980s, he moved to Tete, where he spent two years during the Mozambique Civil War. He served as an adviser to the Soviet planner for the People's Republic of Mozambique.

He earned his doctorate in history from the Soviet Academy of Sciences in 1990, and that same year moved to the United States to study at State University of New York at Binghamton under the sociologist Immanuel Wallerstein. Derluguian received a doctorate in sociology in 1995.

Derluguian taught at Cornell University, the United States Institute of Peace, the University of Michigan and Northwestern University. Since 2013, he has been in the Middle East at New York University Abu Dhabi.

== Publications and research ==
Derluguian was named a Carnegie Scholar in 2001 and received a research grant for his thesis, "The Globalization of Mafia Enterprise: From Diagnosis to Civil Society Counteraction." He wrote the prologue for Anna Politkovskaya's 2003 book, A Small Corner of Hell: Dispatches from Chechnya.

In 2005, he published Bourdieu's Secret Admirer in the Caucasus about the life story of Musa Shanibov, an academic from Kabardino-Balkaria who greatly admired French sociologist Pierre Bourdieu. After the dissolution of the Soviet Union, Shanib became a prominent Kabardin warlord. In 2006, The Times Literary Supplement placed the book among its Books of the Year. The book won the Norbert Elias Essay Prize in 2007.

Derluguian is a former fellow at the Kennan Institute at the Woodrow Wilson International Center for Scholars, where he worked on the project, "The Soviet Collapse, China's Rise: A Comparative Macrosociological Interpretation."

Derluguian is a regular contributor to the Russian magazine Expert. He is currently working on a book on Chechnya, A World History of Ichkeria.

== Select bibliography ==
- Wallerstein, Immanuel; Derluguian, Georgi; Calhoun Craig; Collins, Randall; Mann, Michal (2013). Does Capitalism Have a Future?. Oxford University Press. ISBN 978-0-19-933085-0.
- Derluguian, Georgi (2005). Bourdieu's Secret Admirer in the Caucasus: A World-System Biography. Chicago: University of Chicago Press. ISBN 0-226-14283-3.
- Derluguian, Georgi; Greer, Scott L. (2000). Questioning Geopolitics: Political Projects in a Changing World-System. Westport, Conn.: Greenwood Press. ISBN 0-275-96656-9.
