= Giovanni Arrighi =

Italian economist and sociologist (1937–2009)

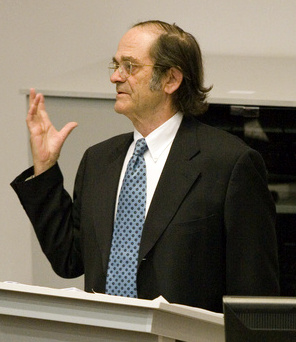
- Giovanni Arrighi giving a lecture at the Faculty of Humanities at Rhodes University, Grahamstown, South Africa (18 April 2007)
- Born: 7 July 1937; Milan, Kingdom of Italy
- Died: 18 June 2009 (aged 71); Baltimore, Maryland, U.S.
- Education: Bocconi University
- Known for: Political Economy; Historical Sociology
- Scientific career
- Fields: Political economy, Historical sociology, International relations
- Workplaces: Johns Hopkins University; Binghamton University

Giovanni Arrighi (7 July 1937 – 18 June 2009) was an Italian economist, sociologist and world-systems analyst, from 1998 a Professor of Sociology at Johns Hopkins University. His work has been translated into over fifteen languages.

== Biography ==
Arrighi was born in Milan, Italy in 1937. He received his Laurea in economics from the Bocconi University in 1960. Arrighi began his career teaching at the University College of Rhodesia (now Zimbabwe) and later at the University College of Dar es Salaam in Tanzania, where he developed arguments about how the labor supply and labor resistance affected the development of colonialism and national liberation movements, and where he met Immanuel Wallerstein with whom he later collaborated on a number of research projects. After returning to Italy in 1969, Arrighi and others formed the "Gruppo Gramsci" in 1971. In 1979 Arrighi joined Wallerstein and Terence Hopkins as a professor of sociology at the Fernand Braudel Center for the Study of Economies, Historical Systems, and Civilizations at Binghamton University. It was during this time that the Fernand Braudel Center became known as the main center of world-systems analysis, attracting scholars from all over the world.

His trilogy on the origins and transformations of global capitalism began in 1994 with a book that reinterpreted the evolution of capitalism, The Long Twentieth Century: Money, Power, and the Origins of Our Times. The book was published in at least ten languages. Giovanni completed a second edition of The Long Twentieth Century in 2009. In 1999, he published Chaos and Governance in the Modern World System with Beverly Silver, and in 2007, he published Adam Smith in Beijing: Lineages of the Twenty-First Century, comparing Western and East Asian economic development and exploring China's rise as an economic world power.

Although in many ways intellectually close to Immanuel Wallerstein, Arrighi tends to ascribe greater significance to the recent shift in economic power to East Asia. He also emphasized his debt to Adam Smith, Max Weber, Karl Marx, Antonio Gramsci, Karl Polanyi and Joseph Schumpeter.

Arrighi died in his home in Baltimore on 18 June 2009. He had been diagnosed with cancer in July 2008. His widow and collaborator is Professor Beverly Silver.

A retrospective interview by David Harvey on his intellectual trajectory, The Winding Paths of Capital, was published in the March/April 2009 issue of New Left Review.

== Works ==
Monographs

- 1967 The Political Economy of Rhodesia
- 1973 Essays on the Political Economy of Africa
- 1978 Geometry of Imperialism
- 1982 Dynamics of Global Crisis (with Samir Amin, Andre Gunder Frank and Immanuel Wallerstein)
- 1985 Semiperipheral Development: The Politics of Southern Europe in the Twentieth Century
- 1989 Antisystemic Movements
- 1990 Transforming the Revolution: Social Movements and the World System (with Samir Amin, Andre Gunder Frank and Immanuel Wallerstein)
- 1994 The Long Twentieth Century: Money, Power, and the Origins of Our Times
- 1999 Chaos and Governance in the Modern World System (with Beverly J. Silver)
- 2003 The Resurgence of East Asia: 500, 150 And 50 Year Perspectives
- 2007 Adam Smith in Beijing: Lineages of the Twenty-First Century

Journal articles and book chapters since 2001

- "Workers North and South" (with B.J. Silver) in C. Leys and L. Panich, eds., The Socialist Register 2001. London: The Merlin Press, 2000. Reprinted (abridged) in L. Amoore, ed., The Global Resistance Reader. London and New York: Routledge, 2005.
- "Braudel, Capitalism and the New Economic Sociology ", Review, XXIV, 1, 2001.
- "Capitalist development in World-historical Perspective", (with Jason W. Moore). In R. Albritton, M. Itoh, R. Westra, A. Zuege, (eds.), Phases of Capitalist Development: Booms, Crises and Globalization. London: Macmillan, 2001.
- "Capitalism and World Dis(order)" (with B. J. Silver), Review of International Studies, XXVII, 2001.
- "Global Capitalism and the Persistence of the North-South Divide", Science and Society, LXIV, 4, 2001.
- "The African crisis: world systemic and regional aspects". New Left Review. II (15). New Left Review. May–June 2002.
- "Lineages of Empire". Historical Materialism 10, 3, 2002. Reprinted In G. Balakrishnan, ed., Debating Empire. London and New York: Verso, 2003.
- "Industrial Convergence, Globalization, and the Persistence of the North-South Divide". Studies in Comparative International Development 38: 1 (2003) (with B.J. Silver and B.D. Brewer).
- "Response". Studies in Comparative International Development 38: 1 (2003) (with B.J. Silver and B.D. Brewer).
- "The social and political economy of global turbulence". New Left Review. II (20). New Left Review. March–April 2003.
- "Kindai Sekai Shisutem no Keisei to Henyou ni okeru Hegemonii Kokka no Yakuwari" ("The Role of Hegemonic States in the Formation and Transitions of the Modern World-System"). In T. Matsuda and S. Akita, eds., Hegemonii Kokka to Sekai Shisutem (Hegemonic States and the Modern World-System). Tokyo: Yamakawa Publishing Company, 2002.
- "Historical Capitalism East and West" (with P.K. Hui, H. Hung, and M. Selden). In G. Arrighi, T. Hamashita and M. Selden, eds., The Resurgence of East Asia: 500, 150 and 50 Year Perspectives. London and New York: Routledge, 2003.
- "Global Inequalities and the Legacy of Dependency Theory". Radical Philosophy Review 5: 1-2 (2002/2003).
- "Polanyi’s ‘Double Movement’: The Belles Epoques of British and US Hegemony Compared" (with B.J. Silver). Politics and Society 31: 2 (2003).
- "Il lungo XX secolo. Una replica". Contemporanea 6:4 (2003).
- "Poza hegemoniami zachodnimi" (with I. Ahmad and M. Shih). Lewa Noga 15 (2003).
- "Hegemony and Antisystemic Movements". In I. Wallerstein, ed., The Modern World-System in the Longue Duree. Boulder, Co: {{Paradigm Publishers, 2004
- "Globalization in World-Systems Perspective". In R. Appelbaum and W. Robinson, eds., Critical Globalization Studies. New York and London: Routledge, 2005.
- "Hegemony unraveling–1" (PDF). New Left Review. II (32). New Left Review. March–April 2005. Archived from the original (PDF) on 2022-02-14.
- "Hegemony unraveling–2" (PDF). New Left Review. II (33). New Left Review. May–June 2005. Archived from the original (PDF) on 2021-05-16.
- "Rough Road to Empire". In F. Tabak, ed., Allies as Rivals: The U.S., Europe, and Japan in a Changing World-System. Boulder, Colorado: Paradigm Press, 2005.
- "States, Markets and Capitalism, East and West". In M. Miller, ed., Worlds of Capitalism. Institutions, Economic Performance, and Governance in the Era of Globalization. London: Routledge, 2005
- "Industrial Convergence and the Persistence of the North-South Industrial Divide: A Rejoinder" (with Beverly J. Silver and Benjamin D. Brewer). Studies in Comparative International Development, Summer 2005, in press.
- "The world economy and the Cold War, 1970–1990". In Melvyn P. Leffler and Odd Arne Westad, eds., The Cambridge History of the Cold War, Volume 3: Endings (pp. 23–44). Cambridge: Cambridge University Press. 2010. ISBN 978-0-521-83721-7.

== See also ==
- World-systems theory
