= Hans L. Zetterberg =

Swedish sociologist

Academic background
- Education: Uppsala University and University of Minnesota

Academic work
- Main interests: Sociologist
- Notable ideas: Social theory
- Influenced: Barney Glaser

Hans L. Zetterberg (3 May 1927 - 28 November 2014) was a Swedish liberal-conservative sociologist.

== Education ==
He studied at Uppsala University and the University of Minnesota and received an honorary doctorate from Umeå University. Zetterberg worked at Columbia University 1953–1964; he was Barney Glaser's doctoral advisor.

== Publications ==
- Zetterberg, Hans Lennart. On Theory and Verification in Sociology. New Jersey: Bedminster Press, 1966.(3rd edition) According to WorldCat, the book is held in 830 libraries
- Zetterberg, Hans Lennart. Sociology in the United States of America; A Trend Report. Westport, Conn: Greenwood Press, 1973.
- Zetterberg, Hans Lennart. Sociological Endeavor. Milton: Routledge, 2018.
- Zetterberg, Hans Lennart. Museums and Adult Education. New York: A.M. Kelley for the International Council of Museums, 1969.
- Zetterberg, Hans Lennart, and Graham Fennell. Sexual Life in Sweden. 2021.
