= Immanuel Wallerstein =

American sociologist and economic historian (1930–2019)

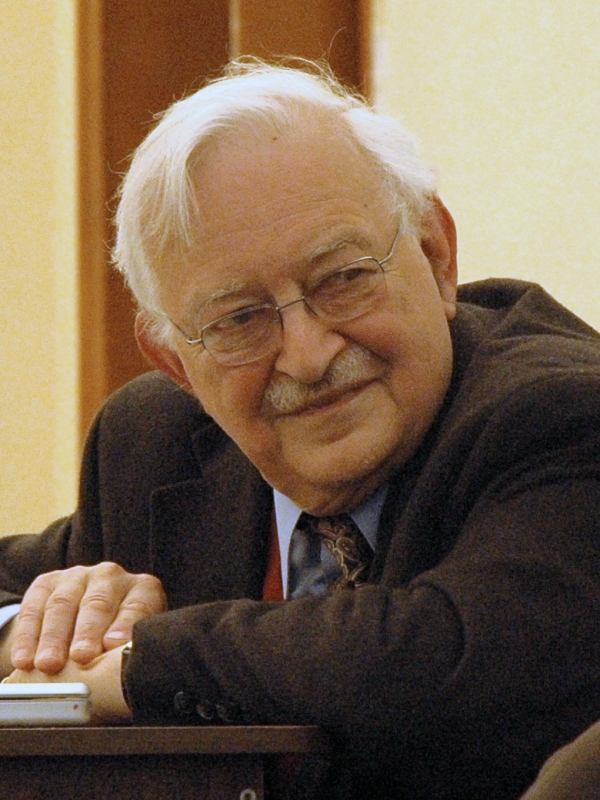
- Wallerstein giving a talk at a seminar at the European University at St. Petersburg in May 2008
- Born: September 28, 1930; New York City, U.S.
- Died: August 31, 2019 (aged 88); Branford, Connecticut, U.S.
- Known for: World-systems theory
- Spouse: Beatrice Friedman
- Children: Katharine Wallerstein, Robert Morgenstern, Susan Morgenstern

Academic background
- Education: Columbia University (BA: 1951, MA: 1954, PhD: 1959)
- Thesis: The Emergence of Two West African Nations: Ghana and the Ivory Coast (1959)
- Doctoral advisor: Hans L. Zetterberg, Robert Staughton Lynd
- Other advisor: C. Wright Mills

Academic work
- Discipline: Sociologist, Historian
- Sub-discipline: Historical sociology, Comparative sociology, World-systems theory
- Institutions: Columbia University; McGill University; Binghamton University; École des Hautes Études en Sciences Sociales; Yale University
- Notable students: Georgi Derluguian, Michael Hechter, John R. Logan, Beverly J. Silver
- Website: http://www.iwallerstein.com/

Immanuel Maurice Wallerstein (/ˈwɔːlərstiːn/ also /ˈwɔːlərstaɪn/; September 28, 1930 – August 31, 2019) was an American sociologist and economic historian. He is perhaps best known for his development in sociology of world-systems approach. He was a Senior Research Scholar at Yale University from 2000 until his death in 2019, and published bimonthly syndicated commentaries through Agence Global on world affairs from October 1998 to July 2019.

He was the 13th president of International Sociological Association (1994–1998).

== Personal life and education ==
His parents, Sara Günsberg (born in 1895) and Menachem Lazar Wallerstein (born in 1890), were Polish Jews from Galicia who moved to Berlin, because of World War I, where they married in 1919. Two years later, Sara gave birth to their first son, Solomon. In 1923, the Wallerstein family emigrated to New York, where Immanuel was born. On the "list of alien passengers for the United States" at the time of his family's emigration, the nationality of his mother and brother was described as Polish.

Having grown up in a politically conscious family, Wallerstein first became interested in world affairs as a teenager. He received all three of his degrees from Columbia University: a BA in 1951, an MA in 1954, and a PhD in 1959, where he completed his dissertation under the supervision of Hans L. Zetterberg and Robert Staughton Lynd. However, throughout his life, Wallerstein also studied at other universities around the world, including Oxford University from 1955 to 1956, Université libre de Bruxelles, Universite Paris 7 Denis Diderot, and Universidad Nacional Autónoma de México.

From 1951 to 1953 Wallerstein served in the U.S. Army. After his discharge, he wrote a master's thesis on McCarthyism as a phenomenon of American political culture. The widely cited work, as Wallerstein himself later stated, "confirmed my sense that I should consider myself, in the language of the 1950s, a 'political sociologist'".

Wallerstein married Beatrice Friedman in 1964, and had a daughter, Katharine Ellen Wallerstein, two years later. He was stepfather to Beatrice's two children from a previous marriage. He and Beatrice had five grandchildren.

== Academic career ==
During his time at Columbia University he was a supporter of students who were active during Columbia University protests of 1968 opposing the university's involvement in the Vietnam War.

Originally, Wallerstein's principal sub-area of study was not American affairs, but the politics of the non-European world, specifically India and Africa. For two decades Wallerstein researched Africa, publishing numerous books and articles, and in 1973 he became president of the African Studies Association.

== Professional career ==
Wallerstein's academic career began at Columbia University where he was an instructor and then associate professor of sociology from 1958 to 1971. From there he moved to McGill University, in Montreal where he taught from 1971 to 1976. He became distinguished professor of sociology at SUNY Binghamton University from 1976 to 1999.

In 1976 Wallerstein was offered the unique opportunity to pursue a new avenue of research, and so became head of the Fernand Braudel Center for the Study of Economies, Historical Systems and Civilization at Binghamton University in New York, whose mission was "to engage in the analysis of large-scale social change over long periods of historical time". The Center opened with the publishing support of a new journal, Review, (of which Wallerstein was the founding editor), and produced a body of work that "went a long way toward invigorating sociology and its sister disciplines, especially history and political-economy". Wallerstein served as a distinguished professor of sociology at SUNY-Binghamton until his retirement in 1999.

During his career Wallerstein held visiting-professor posts in Hong Kong, British Columbia, and Amsterdam, among numerous others. He was awarded multiple honorary titles, intermittently served as Directeur d'études associé at the École des Hautes Études en Sciences Sociales in Paris, and served as president of the International Sociological Association between 1994 and 1998. At this time he also held a titled professorship at New York University and lectured at Columbia University. Similarly, during the 1990s he chaired the Gulbenkian Commission on the Restructuring of the Social Sciences, whose object was to indicate a direction for social scientific inquiry for the next 50 years.

Between 2000 and his death in 2019, Wallerstein worked as a senior research scholar at Yale University. He was also a member of the Advisory Editors Council of the Social Evolution & History journal. In 2003, he received the "Career of Distinguished Scholarship Award" from the American Sociological Association, and in 2004 the International N. D. Kondratieff Foundation and the Russian Academy of Natural Sciences (RAEN) awarded him the Gold Kondratieff Medal. Wallerstein died on August 31, 2019, from an infection, at the age of 88.

Wallerstein was remembered for his willingness to engage personally with younger scholars and to encourage their intellectual work. During his time as a lecturer some of the students in attendance recalled him as "a calm, reserved, elegant man". When taking criticism for his thesis, he would usually be calm and collected. As well as hinting at the fact that he was almost disappointed for the people or audience for not fully comprehending what he wished to establish.

== Theory ==
Wallerstein began as an expert on post-colonial African affairs, which he selected as the focus of his studies after attending international youth conferences in 1951 and 1952. His publications focused almost exclusively on this topic until the early 1970s, when he began to distinguish himself as a historian and theorist of the global capitalist economy on a macroscopic level. His early criticism of global capitalism and championship of "anti-systemic movements" made him an éminence grise with the anti-globalization movement within and outside of the academic community, along with Noam Chomsky (1928– ) and Pierre Bourdieu (1930–2002).

Wallerstein's most important work, The Modern World-System, appeared in four volumes between 1974 and 2011. In it, Wallerstein drew on several intellectual influences. From Karl Marx, Wallerstein took the underlying emphasis on economic factors and their dominance over ideological factors in global politics, and such ideas as the dichotomy between capital and labor, while criticizing deterministic or teleological Marxian views of world economic development through stages such as feudalism and capitalism. From dependency theory, he took the key concepts of "core" and "periphery".

However, Wallerstein named Frantz Fanon (1925–1961), Fernand Braudel (1902–1985), and Ilya Prigogine (1917–2003) as the three individuals who exerted the greatest influence "in modifying my line of argument (as opposed to deepening a parallel line of argument)." In The Essential Wallerstein, he stated that: "Fanon represented for me the expression of the insistence by those disenfranchised by the modern world‑system that they have a voice, a vision, and a claim not merely to justice but to intellectual valuation."; that Braudel, for his description of the development and political implications of extensive networks of economic exchange in the European world between 1400 and 1800, "more than anyone else made me conscious of the central importance of the social construction of time and space and its impact on our analyses."; and that "Prigogine forced me to face the implications of a world in which certainties did not exist – but knowledge still did."

Wallerstein also stated that another major influence on his work was the "world revolution" of 1968. A member of the faculty of Columbia University at the time of the student protests, he participated in a faculty committee that attempted to resolve the dispute. He argued in several works that this revolution marked the end of "liberalism" as a viable ideology in the modern world system. He also argued that the end of the Cold War, rather than marking a triumph for liberalism, indicates that the current system has entered its 'end' phase: a period of crisis that will end only when it is replaced by another system. Wallerstein anticipated the growing importance of the North–South divide at a time when the main world conflict was the Cold War.

Wallerstein was often mocked for arguing since 1980 that the United States is a "hegemon in decline", but since the Iraq War this argument has become more widespread. During this time, Wallerstein also argued that the development of the capitalist world economy was detrimental to a large proportion of the world's population. Like Marx, Wallerstein predicted that capitalism will be replaced by a socialist economy, a view held in the 1970s, but reassessed in the 1980s. He concluded that the successor system(s) is unknowable.

Wallerstein both participated in and wrote about the World Social Forum.

=== The Modern World-System ===
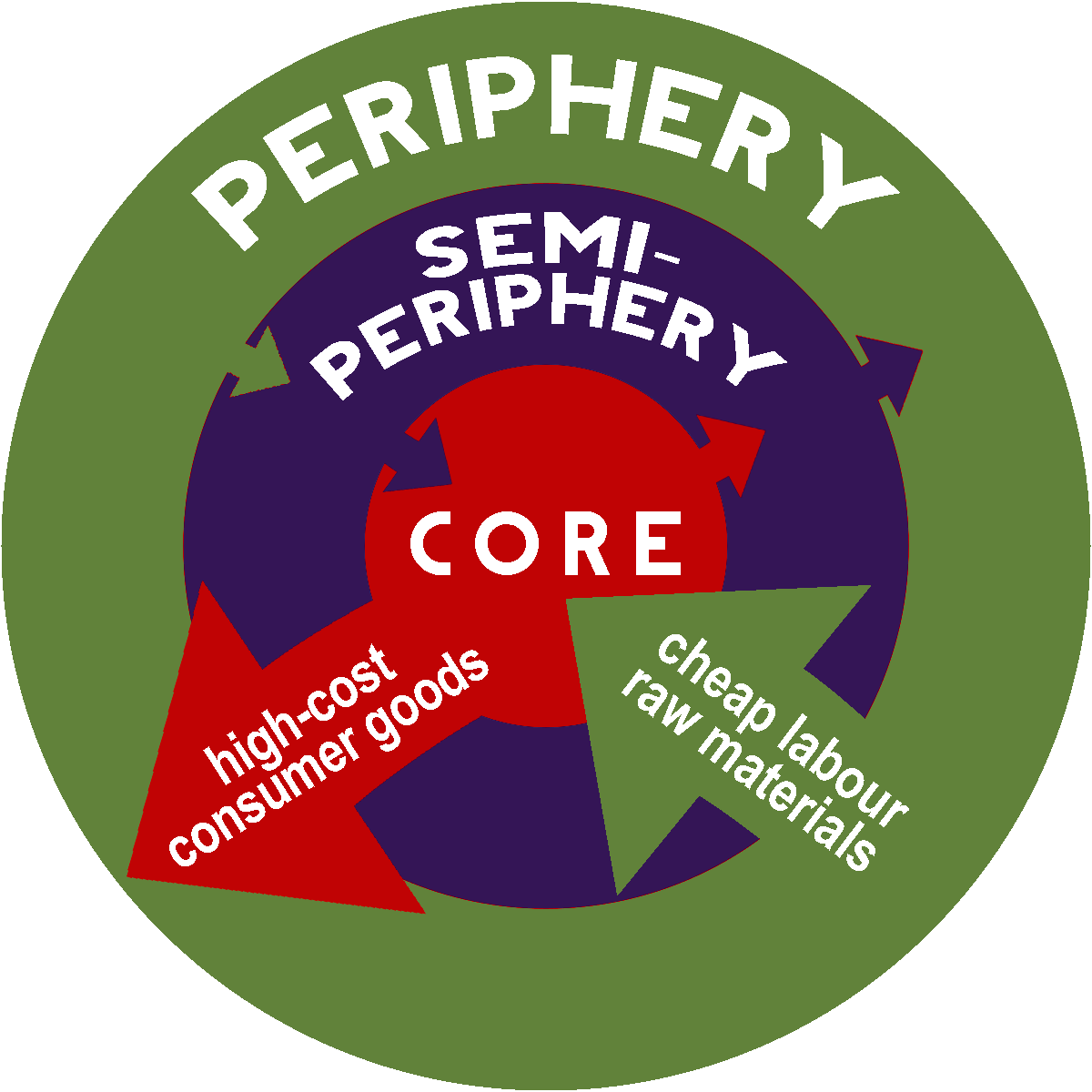
A model of a core-periphery system like that used by Wallerstein

Wallerstein's first volume on world-systems theory (The Modern World System, 1974) was predominantly written during a year at the Center for Advanced Study in the Behavioral Sciences (now affiliated with Stanford University). In it, he argues that the modern world system is distinguished from empires by its reliance on economic control of the world order by a dominating capitalist center (core) in systemic economic and political relation to peripheral and semi-peripheral world areas.

Wallerstein rejected the notion of a "Third World", claiming that there is only one world connected by a complex network of economic exchange relationships — i.e., a "world-economy" or "world-system" in which the "dichotomy of capital and labor" and the endless "accumulation of capital" by competing agents (historically including, but not limited, to nation-states) account for frictions. This approach is known as the world-system theory.

Wallerstein located the origin of the modern world-system in 16th-century Western Europe and the Americas. An initially slight advance in capital accumulation in Britain, the Dutch Republic, and France, due to specific political circumstances at the end of the period of feudalism, set in motion a process of gradual expansion. As a result, only one global network or system of economic exchange exists in modern society. By the 19th century, virtually every area on earth was incorporated into the capitalist world-economy.

The capitalist world-system is far from homogeneous in cultural, political, and economic terms; instead, it is characterized by fundamental differences in social development, accumulation of political power, and capital. Contrary to affirmative theories of modernization and capitalism, Wallerstein did not conceive of these differences as mere residues or irregularities that can and will be overcome as the system evolves.

A lasting division of the world into core, semi-periphery, and periphery is an inherent feature of world-system theory. Other theories, partially drawn on by Wallerstein, leave out the semi-periphery and do not allow for a grayscale of development. Areas which have so far remained outside the reach of the world-system enter it at the stage of "periphery". There is a fundamental and institutionally stabilized "division of labor" between core and periphery: while the core has a high level of technological development and manufactures complex products, the role of the periphery is to supply raw materials, agricultural products, and cheap labor for the expanding agents of the core. Economic exchange between core and periphery takes place on unequal terms: the periphery is forced to sell its products at low prices, but has to buy the core's products at comparatively high prices. Once established, this unequal state tends to stabilize itself due to inherent, quasi-deterministic constraints. The statuses of core and periphery are not exclusive and fixed geographically, but are relative to each other. A zone defined as "semi-periphery" acts as a periphery to the core and as a core to the periphery. At the end of the 20th century, this zone would comprise Eastern Europe, China, Brazil, and Mexico. Core and peripheral zones can co-exist in the same location.

One effect of the expansion of the world-system is the commodification of things, including human labor. Natural resources, land, labor, and human relationships are gradually being stripped of their "intrinsic" value and turned into commodities in a market which determines their exchange value.

In the last two decades of his life, Wallerstein increasingly focused on the intellectual foundations of the modern world-system and the pursuit of universal theories of human behavior. In addition, he showed interest in the "structures of knowledge" defined by the disciplinary division between sociology, anthropology, political science, economics, and the humanities, which he himself regarded as Eurocentric. In analyzing them, he was highly influenced by the "new sciences" of theorists like Ilya Prigogine.

== Terms and definitions ==
=== Capitalist world-system ===
Wallerstein's definition follows dependency theory, which intended to combine the developments of the different societies since the 16th century in different regions into one collective development. The main characteristic of his definition is the development of a global division of labour, including the existence of independent political units (in this case, states) at the same time. There is no political center, compared to global empires like the Roman Empire; instead, the capitalist world-system is identified by the global market economy. It is divided into core, semi-periphery, and periphery regions, and is ruled by the capitalist mode of production.

=== Core/periphery ===
Defines the difference between developed and developing countries, characterized e.g. by power or wealth. The core refers to developed countries, the periphery to the dependent developing countries. The main reason for the position of the developed countries is economic power. Wallerstein "used the term core to suggest a multicentric region containing a group of states rather than the term center, which implies a hierarchy with a single peak."

=== Semi-periphery ===
Defines states that are located between core and periphery, and who benefit from the periphery through unequal exchange relations. At the same time, the core benefits from the semi-periphery through unequal exchange relations.

=== Quasi-monopolies ===
Defines a kind of monopoly where there is more than one service provider for a particular good/service. Wallerstein claims that quasi-monopolies are self-liquidating because new sellers go into the market by exerting political pressure to open markets to competition.

=== Kondratiev waves ===
A Kondratiev wave is defined as a cyclical tendency in the world's economy. It is also known as a supercycle. Wallerstein argues that global wars are tied to Kondratiev waves. According to him, global conflicts occur as the summer phase of a wave begins, which is when production of goods and services around the world are on an upswing.

== Honors and fellowships ==
- Phi Beta Kappa, 1951
- Foreign Area Fellowship, Africa, 1955–57
- Fellow, Center for Advanced Study in the Behavioral Sciences, Stanford, 1970–71
- Ford Fellow in Economics, Political Science and Sociology, 1970–71
- Sorokin Prize (for Distinguished Scholarship), American Sociological Association, 1975
- Officier, Ordre des Arts et des Lettres, France, 1984
- George A. Miller Visiting professor, University of Illinois-Urbana, 1989
- Wei Lun Visiting professor, Chinese University of Hong Kong, 1991
- University Award for Excellence in Scholarship, Binghamton University, 1991
- Medal of the university, University of Helsinki, 1992
- Gulbenkian Professor of Science and Technology, 1994
- Fellow, The American Academy of Arts and Sciences, 1998
- IPE Distinguished Scholar, International Studies Association, 1998
- Leerstoel (chair) Immanuel Wallerstein, University of Ghent, 2002– [Inaugural Lecture by IW on Mar. 11, 2002]
- Career of Distinguished Scholarship Award, American Sociological Association, 2003
- Career of Distinguished Scholarship Award, Political Economy of the World-System Section of American Sociological Association, 2003
- Premio Carlos Marx 2003, Fondo Cultural Tercer Mundo, Mexico
- Distinguished Fellow, St. John's College, University of British Columbia, 2004–present
- Centro de Estudios, Información y Documentación Immanuel Wallerstein, Univ. de la Tierra-Chiapas y el CIDECI Las Casas, 2004–present
- N.D. Kondratieff Gold Medal, Russian Academy of Natural Sciences, 2005
- International Sociological Association Award for Excellence in Research and Practice, 2014

== Works ==
Year	Title	Author(s)	Publisher
1961	Africa, The Politics of Independence	Immanuel Wallerstein	New York: Vintage Books
1964	The Road to Independence: Ghana and the Ivory Coast	Immanuel Wallerstein	Paris & The Hague: Mouton
1967	Africa: The Politics of Unity	Immanuel Wallerstein	New York: Random House
1969	University in Turmoil: The Politics of Change	Immanuel Wallerstein	New York: Atheneum
1972	Africa: Tradition & Change	Immanuel Wallerstein with Evelyn Jones Rich	New York: Random House
1974	The Modern World-System, vol. I: Capitalist Agriculture and the Origins of the European World-Economy in the Sixteenth Century	Immanuel Wallerstein	New York/London: Academic Press
1979	The Capitalist World-Economy	Immanuel Wallerstein	Cambridge University Press
1980	The Modern World-System, vol. II: Mercantilism and the Consolidation of the European World-Economy, 1600–1750	Immanuel Wallerstein	New York: Academic Press
1982	World-Systems Analysis: Theory and Methodology	Immanuel Wallerstein with Terence K. Hopkins et al.	Beverly Hills: Sage
1982	Dynamics of Global Crisis	Immanuel Wallerstein with Samir Amin, Giovanni Arrighi and Andre Gunder Frank	London: Macmillan
1983	Historical Capitalism	Immanuel Wallerstein	London: Verso
1984	The Politics of the World-Economy. The States, the Movements and the Civilizations	Immanuel Wallerstein	Cambridge: Cambridge University Press
1986	Africa and the Modern World	Immanuel Wallerstein	Trenton, NJ: Africa World Press
1989	The Modern World-System, vol. III: The Second Great Expansion of the Capitalist World-Economy, 1730-1840s	Immanuel Wallerstein	San Diego: Academic Press
1989	Antisystemic Movements	Immanuel Wallerstein with Giovanni Arrighi and Terence K. Hopkins	London: Verso
1990	Transforming the Revolution: Social Movements and the World-System	Immanuel Wallerstein with Samir Amin, Giovanni Arrighi and Andre Gunder Frank	New York: Monthly Review Press
1991	Race, Nation, Class: Ambiguous Identities	Immanuel Wallerstein with Étienne Balibar	London: Verso.
1991	Geopolitics and Geoculture: Essays on the Changing World-System	Immanuel Wallerstein	Cambridge: Cambridge University Press
1991	Unthinking Social Science: The Limits of Nineteenth Century Paradigms	Immanuel Wallerstein	Cambridge: Polity
1995	After Liberalism	Immanuel Wallerstein	New York: New Press
1995	Historical Capitalism, with Capitalist Civilization	Immanuel Wallerstein	London: Verso
1998	Utopistics: Or, Historical Choices of the Twenty-first Century	Immanuel Wallerstein	New York: New Press
1999	The End of the World As We Know It: Social Science for the Twenty-first Century	Immanuel Wallerstein	Minneapolis: University of Minnesota Press
2001	Democracy, Capitalism, and Transformation	Immanuel Wallerstein	Documenta 11, Vienna, March 16, 2001
2003	Decline of American Power: The U.S. in a Chaotic World	Immanuel Wallerstein	New York: New Press
2004	The Uncertainties of Knowledge	Immanuel Wallerstein	Philadelphia: Temple University Press
2004	World-Systems Analysis: An Introduction	Immanuel Wallerstein	Durham, North Carolina: Duke University Press
2004	Alternatives: The U.S. Confronts the World	Immanuel Wallerstein	Boulder, Colorado: Paradigm Press
2006	European Universalism: The Rhetoric of Power	Immanuel Wallerstein	New York: New Press
2011	The Modern World-System, vol. IV: Centrist Liberalism Triumphant, 1789–1914	Immanuel Wallerstein	Berkeley: University of California Press
2013	Uncertain Worlds: World-Systems Analysis in Changing Times	Immanuel Wallerstein with Charles Lemert and Carlos Antonio Aguirre Rojas	Boulder, CO: Paradigm Publishers
2013	Does Capitalism Have a Future?	Immanuel Wallerstein with Randall Collins, Michael Mann, Georgi Derluguian and Craig Calhoun	New York: Oxford University Press
2015	The World is Out of Joint: World-Historical Interpretations of Continuing Polarizations	Immanuel Wallerstein (editor)	Boulder, CO: Paradigm Publishers
2022	The Global Left: Yesterday, Today, Tomorrow	Immanuel Wallerstein (editor)	Routledge

== See also ==
- Historical sociology
- Marxist sociology
- Late capitalism
