= Development theory =

Theories about how desirable change in society is best achieved

Development theory is a collection of theories about how desirable change in society is best achieved. Such theories draw on a variety of social science disciplines and approaches. In this article, multiple theories are discussed, as are recent developments with regard to these theories. Depending on which theory that is being looked at, there are different explanations to the process of development and their inequalities.

== Modernization theory ==
Modernization theory is used to analyze the processes in which modernization in societies take place. The theory looks at which aspects of countries are beneficial and which constitute obstacles for economic development. The idea is that development assistance targeted at those particular aspects can lead to modernization of 'traditional' or 'backward' societies. Scientists from various research disciplines have contributed to modernization theory.

=== Comtean Roots ===
Some scholars argue that twentieth-century development theory inherited a broadly positivist and evolutionary framework from Auguste Comte’s “law of three stages,” which proposed that societies progress from theological to metaphysical and finally scientific forms of reasoning. Early modernization theorists, including Walt W. Rostow and Daniel Lerner, echoed this schema by portraying development as a linear transition from “traditional” to “modern” society, characterized by industrialization, rational bureaucracy, and scientific attitudes. Critics note that this Comtean legacy contributed to deterministic and Eurocentric assumptions, implying that Western institutional and cultural forms represent the universal end point of social evolution and that non-Western societies must follow the same historical trajectory. Basically, development theory states that developing nations must pass through stages: traditional → transitional → modern. This is exactly like Comte's law of three stages (theological → metaphysical → positive), but renamed. Some historians argue that post–World War II development institutions, including the World Bank, IMF, and U.S. modernization theorists, implicitly adopted Comtean assumptions about linear social evolution, even when they did not cite Auguste Comte directly.

=== Sociological and anthropological modernization theory ===
The earliest principles of modernization theory can be derived from the idea of progress, which stated that people can develop and change their society themselves. Marquis de Condorcet was involved in the origins of this theory. This theory also states that technological advancements and economic changes can lead to changes in moral and cultural values. The French sociologist Émile Durkheim stressed the interdependence of institutions in a society and the way in which they interact with cultural and social unity. His work The Division of Labor in Society was very influential. It described how social order is maintained in society and ways in which primitive societies can make the transition to more advanced societies.

Other scientists who have contributed to the development of modernization theory are: David Apter, who did research on the political system and history of democracy; Seymour Martin Lipset, who argued that economic development leads to social changes which tend to lead to democracy; David McClelland, who approached modernization from the psychological side with his motivations theory; and Talcott Parsons who used his pattern variables to compare backwardness to modernity.

=== Linear stages of growth model ===
The linear stages of growth model is an economic model which is heavily inspired by the Marshall Plan which was used to revitalize Europe's economy after World War II. It assumes that economic growth can only be achieved by industrialization. Growth can be restricted by local institutions and social attitudes, especially if these aspects influence the savings rate and investments. The constraints impeding economic growth are thus considered by this model to be internal to society.

According to the linear stages of growth model, a correctly designed massive injection of capital coupled with intervention by the public sector would ultimately lead to industrialization and economic development of a developing nation.

The Rostow's stages of growth model is the most well-known example of the linear stages of growth model. Walt W. Rostow identified five stages through which developing countries had to pass to reach an advanced economy status: (1) Traditional society, (2) Preconditions for take-off, (3) Take-off, (4) Drive to maturity, (5) Age of high mass consumption. He argued that economic development could be led by certain strong sectors; this is in contrast to for instance Marxism which states that sectors should develop equally. According to Rostow's model, a country needed to follow some rules of development to reach the take-off: (1) The investment rate of a country needs to be increased to at least 10% of its GDP, (2) One or two manufacturing sectors with a high rate of growth need to be established, (3) An institutional, political and social framework has to exist or be created in order to promote the expansion of those sectors.

The Rostow model has serious flaws, of which the most serious are: (1) The model assumes that development can be achieved through a basic sequence of stages which are the same for all countries, a doubtful assumption; (2) The model measures development solely by means of the increase of GDP per capita; (3) The model focuses on characteristics of development, but does not identify the causal factors which lead development to occur. As such, it neglects the social structures that have to be present to foster development.

Economic modernization theories such as Rostow's stages model have been heavily inspired by the Harrod-Domar model which explains in a mathematical way the growth rate of a country in terms of the savings rate and the productivity of capital. Heavy state involvement has often been considered necessary for successful development in economic modernization theory; Paul Rosenstein-Rodan, Ragnar Nurkse and Kurt Mandelbaum argued that a big push model in infrastructure investment and planning was necessary for the stimulation of industrialization, and that the private sector would not be able to provide the resources for this on its own. Another influential theory of modernization is the dual-sector model by Arthur Lewis. In this model Lewis explained how the traditional stagnant rural sector is gradually replaced by a growing modern and dynamic manufacturing and service economy.

Because of the focus on the need for investments in capital, the Linear Stages of Growth Models are sometimes referred to as suffering from ‘capital fundamentalism’.

=== Critics of modernization theory ===
Modernization theory observes traditions and pre-existing institutions of so-called "primitive" societies as obstacles to modern economic growth. Modernization which is forced from outside upon a society might induce violent and radical change, but according to modernization theorists it is generally worth this side effect. Critics point to traditional societies as being destroyed and slipping away to a modern form of poverty without ever gaining the promised advantages of modernization.

== Structuralism ==
Structuralism is a development theory which focuses on structural aspects which impede the economic growth of developing countries. The unit of analysis is the transformation of a country's economy from, mainly, a subsistence agriculture to a modern, urbanized manufacturing and service economy. Policy prescriptions resulting from structuralist thinking include major government intervention in the economy to fuel the industrial sector, known as import substitution industrialization (ISI). This structural transformation of the developing country is pursued in order to create an economy which in the end enjoys self-sustaining growth. This can only be reached by ending the reliance of the underdeveloped country on exports of primary goods (agricultural and mining products), and pursuing inward-oriented development by shielding the domestic economy from that of the developed economies. Trade with advanced economies is minimized through the erection of all kinds of trade barriers and an overvaluation of the domestic exchange rate; in this way the production of domestic substitutes of formerly imported industrial products is encouraged.

The logic of the strategy rests on the infant industry argument, which states that young industries initially do not have the economies of scale and experience to be able to compete with foreign competitors and thus need to be protected until they are able to compete in the free market. The Prebisch–Singer hypothesis states that over time the terms of trade for commodities deteriorate compared to those for manufactured goods, because the income elasticity of demand of manufactured goods is greater than that of primary products. If true, this would also support the ISI strategy.

Structuralists argue that the only way Third World countries can develop is through action by the state. Third world countries have to push industrialization and have to reduce their dependency on trade with the First World, and trade among themselves.

The roots of structuralism lie in South America, and particularly Chile. In 1950, Raul Prebisch went to Chile to become the first director of the Economic Commission for Latin America. In Chile, he cooperated with Celso Furtado, Aníbal Pinto, Osvaldo Sunkel, and Dudley Seers, who all became influential structuralists.

== Dependency theory ==
Dependency theory is essentially a follow-up to structuralist thinking, and shares many of its core ideas. Whereas structuralists did not consider that development would be possible at all unless a strategy of delinking and rigorous ISI was pursued, dependency thinking could allow development with external links with the developed parts of the globe. However, this kind of development is considered to be "dependent development", i.e., it does not have an internal domestic dynamic in the developing country and thus remains highly vulnerable to the economic vagaries of the world market. Dependency thinking starts from the notion that resources flow from the ‘periphery’ of poor and underdeveloped states to a ‘core’ of wealthy countries, which leads to accumulation of wealth in the rich states at the expense of the poor states. Contrary to modernization theory, dependency theory states that not all societies progress through similar stages of development. Periphery states have unique features, structures and institutions of their own and are considered weaker with regards to the world market economy, while the developed nations have never been in this colonized position in the past. Dependency theorists argue that underdeveloped countries remain economically vulnerable unless they reduce their connections to the world market.

Dependency theory states that poor nations provide natural resources and cheap labor for developed nations, without which the developed nations could not have the standard of living which they enjoy. When underdeveloped countries try to remove the Core's influence, the developed countries hinder their attempts to keep control. This means that poverty of developing nations is not the result of the disintegration of these countries in the world system, but because of the way in which they are integrated into this system.

In addition to its structuralist roots, dependency theory has much overlap with Neo-Marxism and World Systems Theory, which is also reflected in the work of Immanuel Wallerstein, a famous dependency theorist. Wallerstein rejects the notion of a Third World, claiming that there is only one world which is connected by economic relations (World Systems Theory). He argues that this system inherently leads to a division of the world in core, semi-periphery and periphery. One of the results of expansion of the world-system is the commodification of things, like natural resources, labor and human relationships.

== Basic needs ==
The basic needs model was introduced by the International Labour Organization in 1976, mainly in reaction to prevalent modernization- and structuralism-inspired development approaches, which were not achieving satisfactory results in terms of poverty alleviation and combating inequality in developing countries. It tried to define an absolute minimum of resources necessary for long-term physical well-being. The poverty line which follows from this, is the amount of income needed to satisfy those basic needs. The approach has been applied in the sphere of development assistance, to determine what a society needs for subsistence, and for poor population groups to rise above the poverty line. Basic needs theory does not focus on investing in economically productive activities. Basic needs can be used as an indicator of the absolute minimum an individual needs to survive.

Proponents of basic needs have argued that elimination of absolute poverty is a good way to make people active in society so that they can provide labor more easily and act as consumers and savers. There have been also many critics of the basic needs approach. It would lack theoretical rigour, practical precision, be in conflict with growth promotion policies, and run the risk of leaving developing countries in permanent turmoil.

== Neoclassical theory ==
Neoclassical development theory has it origins in its predecessor and as such: classical economics. Classical economics was developed in the 18th and 19th centuries and dealt with the value of products and on which production factors it depends. Early contributors to this theory are Adam Smith and David Ricardo. Classical economists argued – as do the neoclassical ones – in favor of the free market, and against government intervention in those markets. The 'invisible hand' of Adam Smith makes sure that free trade will ultimately benefit all of society. John Maynard Keynes was a very influential classical economist as well, having written his General Theory of Employment, Interest, and Money in 1936.

Neoclassical development theory became influential towards the end of the 1970s, fired by the election of Margaret Thatcher in the UK and Ronald Reagan in the USA. Also, the World Bank shifted from its Basic Needs approach to a neoclassical approach in 1980. From the beginning of the 1980s, neoclassical development theory really began to roll out.

=== Structural adjustment ===
One of the implications of the neoclassical development theory for developing countries were the Structural Adjustment Programmes (SAPs) which the World Bank and the International Monetary Fund wanted them to adopt. Important aspects of those SAPs include:

- Fiscal austerity (reduction in government spending)
- Privatization (which should both raise money for governments and improve efficiency and financial performance of the firms involved)
- Trade liberalization, currency devaluation and the abolition of marketing boards (to maximize the static comparative advantage the developing country has on the global market)
- Retrenchment of the government and deregulation (in order to stimulate the free market)

These measures are more or less reflected by the themes which were identified by the Institute of International Economics which were believed to be necessary for the recovery of Latin America from the economic and financial crises of the 1980s. These themes are known as the Washington consensus, a termed coined in 1989 by the economist John Williamson.

== Recent trends ==
=== Post-development theory ===
Postdevelopment theory is a school of thought which questions the idea of national economic development altogether. According to postdevelopment scholars, the goal of improving living standards leans on arbitrary claims as to the desirability and possibility of that goal. Postdevelopment theory arose in the 1980s and 1990s.

According to postdevelopment theorists, the idea of development is just a 'mental structure' (Wolfgang Sachs) which has resulted in a hierarchy of developed and underdeveloped nations, of which the underdeveloped nations desire to be like developed nations. Development thinking has been dominated by the West and is very ethnocentric, according to Sachs. The Western lifestyle may neither be a realistic nor a desirable goal for the world's population, postdevelopment theorists argue. Development is being seen as a loss of a country's own culture, people's perception of themselves and modes of life. According to Majid Rahnema, another leading postdevelopment scholar, things like notions of poverty are very culturally embedded and can differ a lot among cultures. The institutes which voice the concern over underdevelopment are very Western-oriented, and postdevelopment calls for a broader cultural involvement in development thinking.

Postdevelopment proposes a vision of society which removes itself from the ideas which currently dominate it. According to Arturo Escobar, postdevelopment is interested instead in local culture and knowledge, a critical view against established sciences and the promotion of local grassroots movements. Also, postdevelopment argues for structural change in order to reach solidarity, reciprocity, and a larger involvement of traditional knowledge.

=== Sustainable development ===
Sustainable development is development that meets the needs of the present without compromising the ability of future generations to meet their own needs. (Brundtland Commission) There exist more definitions of sustainable development, but they all have to do with the carrying capacity of the earth and its natural systems and the challenges faced by humanity. Sustainable development can be broken up into environmental sustainability, economic sustainability and sociopolitical sustainability. The book Limits to Growth, commissioned by the Club of Rome, gave huge momentum to the thinking about sustainability. Global warming issues are also problems which are emphasized by the sustainable development movement. This led to the 1997 Kyoto Accord, with the plan to cap greenhouse-gas emissions.

Opponents of the implications of sustainable development often point to the environmental Kuznets curve. The idea behind this curve is that, as an economy grows, it shifts towards more capital and knowledge-intensive production. This means that as an economy grows, its pollution output increases, but only until it reaches a particular threshold where production becomes less resource-intensive and more sustainable. This means that a pro-growth, not an anti-growth policy is needed to solve the environmental problem. But the evidence for the environmental Kuznets curve is quite weak. Also, empirically spoken, people tend to consume more products when their income increases. Maybe those products have been produced in a more environmentally friendly way, but on the whole the higher consumption negates this effect. There are people like Julian Simon however who argue that future technological developments will resolve future problems.

=== Human development theory ===
Human development theory is a theory which uses ideas from different origins, such as ecology, sustainable development, feminism and welfare economics. It wants to avoid normative politics and is focused on how social capital and instructional capital can be deployed to optimize the overall value of human capital in an economy.

Amartya Sen and Mahbub ul Haq are the most well-known human development theorists. The work of Sen is focused on capabilities: what people can do and be. It is these capabilities, rather than the income or goods that they receive (as in the Basic Needs approach), that determine their well-being. This core idea also underlies the construction of the Human Development Index, a human-focused measure of development pioneered by the UNDP in its Human Development Reports; this approach has become popular the world over, with indexes and reports published by individual counties, including the American Human Development Index and Report in the United States. The economic side of Sen's work can best be categorized under welfare economics, which evaluates the effects of economic policies on the well-being of peoples. Sen wrote the influential book Development as Freedom which added an important ethical side to development economics.

== See also ==
- Development (disambiguation)
- Ecological modernization theory
- Economic development
- International development
- World-systems theory
- Progress
- Progressivism
- Development-induced displacement
- Manifest destiny
- White mans burden
- Civilizing mission
- Christian mission
- White savior
