= Semi-periphery countries =

Industrializing, low-income countries

A world map of countries by their supposed trading status in 2000, using the world system differentiation into core countries (blue), semi-periphery countries (yellow) and periphery countries (red). Based on the list in Chase-Dunn, Kawana, and Brewer (2000).

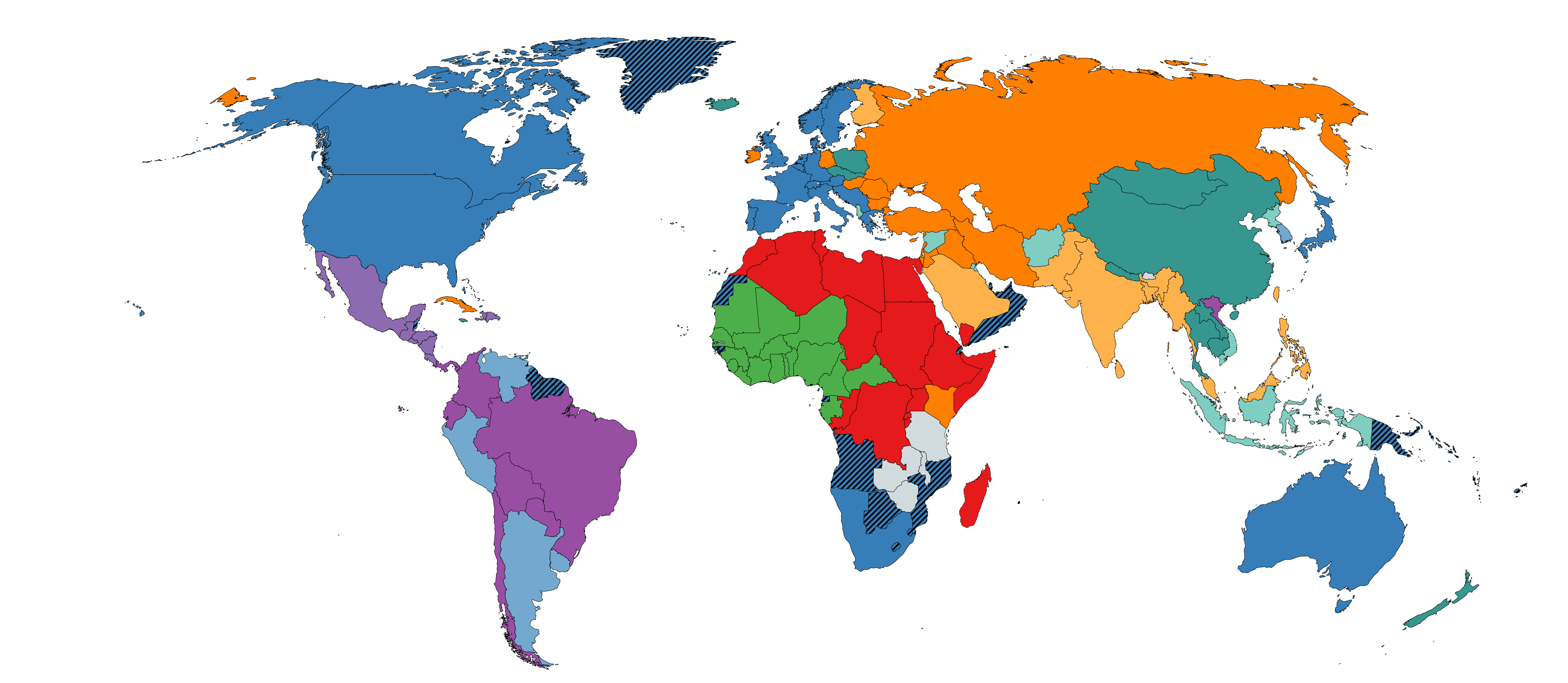
A world map of countries in 1965 colour-coded into 'blocks' based on trade, military interventions, diplomats and treaties: Block A Block B Block C & with dashed lines indicates colonies of Block C countries Block C' Block D Block D' Block E Block E' Block F Block F'

In world-systems theory, semi-periphery countries are the industrializing, mostly capitalist countries that are positioned between the periphery and the core countries. Semi-periphery countries have organizational characteristics of both core countries and periphery countries and are often geographically located between core and peripheral regions as well as between two or more competing core regions.

Semi-periphery regions play a major role in mediating economic, political, and social activities that link core and peripheral areas. These regions allow for the possibility of innovative technology, reforms in social and organizational structure, and dominance over peripheral nations. These changes can lead to a semi-periphery country being promoted to a core nation. Semi-periphery is, however, more than a description, as it also serves as a position within the world hierarchy in which social and economic change can be interpreted.

World-systems theory describes the semi-periphery as a key structural element in the world economy. The semi-periphery plays a vital role comparable to that of the role that Spain and Portugal played in the 17th and the 18th centuries as intermediate trading groups within the early modern European commercial system.

Today, the semi-periphery is generally industrialized. Semi-peripheral countries contribute to the manufacturing and exportation of a variety of goods. They are marked by above average land mass, as exemplified by Argentina, China, India, Brazil, Mexico, Indonesia, and Iran. More land mass typically means an increased market size and share. Semi-peripheral nations are not all large, however, as smaller countries such as Israel, Poland, and Greece can be described to exist within the semi-periphery.

== Sociological theory ==
Semi-peripheral countries offer their citizens relatively diverse economic opportunities but also have extreme gaps between the rich and poor. World-system theorists originally used only two categories: periphery countries and core countries. A need for an intermediate category became quickly apparent and led to the establishment of the semi-periphery category for societies that have moved away from the periphery but have not become core. In other words, the category describes societies that remain dependent and to some extent underdeveloped although they have achieved significant levels of industrialization. Semi-peripheral countries are tied into dynamic world systems that focus on the reliance of poor nations upon the wealthy, a concept known as the dependency theory. The term semi-periphery has been applied to countries that existed as early as in the 13th century. In theory, the creation of a semi-periphery category has added sociological and historical layers to previous developmental theories but still has similar, inherently capitalist, foundations.

=== Function ===
The semi-periphery is needed to stabilize the world system, as it facilitates interaction and provides a connection between the low-income peripheral states and the high-income core states by adding another step in the world system hierarchy. As the middle ground, semi-peripheral countries display characteristics of both the core and the periphery. They also serve as a political buffer zone in that while they are exploited, they are also the exploiters. Those areas have been core regions in the past or formerly-peripheral areas and have since advanced in the world economy.

Semi-peripheral nations are a necessary structural element in a world-trade system since they can serve to alleviate the political pressures that the core can exert upon the periphery and the political unrest that the periphery can direct back at the core. On the other hand, the semi-periphery can find itself excluded from the region's politics, as it lies just outside the bounds of political arena of the core states.

The semi-periphery exists because it needs to divide the economic power between the core and the periphery. Semi-periphery, referred to as the middle class by Wallerstein, is what makes the capitalist world function because it is much like the sociological structural functionalism theory, and norms, customs, traditions, and institutions act as "organs" that work toward the proper functioning of the "body" as a whole. Without those industrializing countries, change will never reach the periphery.

In terms of their contribution to industry and economy, the contemporary semi-peripheral states are semi-industrialized. Semi-peripheral countries are major exporters of minerals and agricultural goods. They are often focused in the manufacturing and exportation of industrial goods and commodities. While those advances separate the semi-periphery from the periphery, they lack the power and the economic dominance of core nations and still have a lot of unmanaged poverty, which places them beneath the core. Semi-peripheral countries are important contributors to the world economy for those reasons and because they tend to have an above-average land mass and so they are host to an above average-market. A primary example is China, a country with not only a large area but also a large population.

== History and development ==
=== 13th century ===
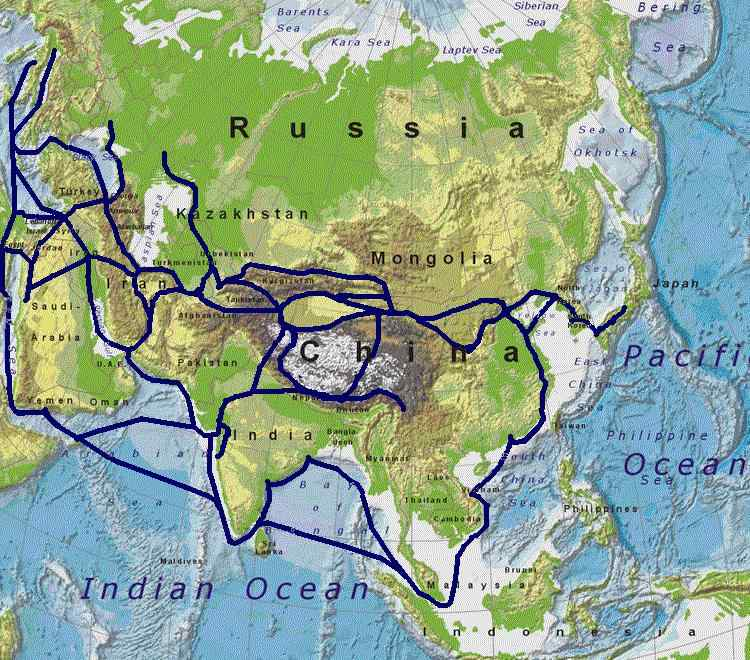
Ancient Silk Road trade routes across Eurasia

This era of human history found the semi-periphery concentrated in the area stretching from the Middle East to China, including India and the Mongol Empire, and it was the first time in history that the peripheries and semi-peripheries of the world became connected and involved in the trade of the world both with cores and with each other. Through a lucrative trade system, including heavy taxing of goods traveling through their borders, they were able to maintain a steady stream of wealth, becoming the driving forces of economic change throughout this time period. In addition, a heavy emphasis on defense and border security, particularly among the Mongols, allowed them to be fairly impenetrable trade obstacles.

Geography also played a role, as seen in India's development of an impressive maritime industry. Because of its position along a convenient route through the Indian Ocean, India established its role as a "hinge" between the East and the West. Through their positions within the world trade system, semi-peripheries in the Middle East became crucially important in connecting the cities of Chinese and Indian cores with the fledgling cities of Europe and served as key points between other, more major core cities in the region, such as Baghdad, Cairo, and Aden.

=== 1300–1450 ===
The Black Death rapidly spread along the major European sea and land trade routes.

Following increases in population and commerce in Western Europe in the 13th century, the feudal system met severe economic difficulties in the 14th and the early 15th centuries. The decline in development was caused by a combination of the decline in agricultural production, the shrinking economy that had already hit its peak within the current feudal structure, and the devastating effects of the Black Plague pandemic. The regression of Western Europe into semi-periphery and periphery allowed for the rise of the trading powers of Italy, most notably Genoa and Venice. These Italian city-states took advantage of their established trade connections with the Mongol Empire, the Far East, the Middle East, and the other Mediterranean powers to maintain their growth despite the economic failures of their European trade partners. Genoa and Venice had influence beyond their trade channels. Both were instrumental in the Crusades through their provisions of troops, transport vessels, and naval ships. Genoa also assisted the Byzantine Empire by helping it recapture its capital, Constantinople, in the late 13th century. The Byzantine Empire took advantage of its strategic position along various trade routes and the decline of Western Europe to rise to core status until its fall in 1453.

During this time period, Genoa and Venice developed forms of laissez-faire government and institutions that are viewed as precursors to modern capitalism. Despite those advances in influence and entrepreneurship, Genoa and Venice suffered from the crippling effects of the Black Plague as much of the rest of Europe before them. Venice survived because of its connection with the Southern trade route, but its strength had been much reduced by the mid-15th century. Genoa never fully recovered from the Black Death and its defeat at the hands of Venice in the late 14th century. The decline of Genoa and the shift in Venice's focus to the Red Sea trade route left the western Mediterranean and the Atlantic open to Portugal and Spain, which were already better positioned geographically to control Atlantic trade routes.

=== 1450–1700 ===
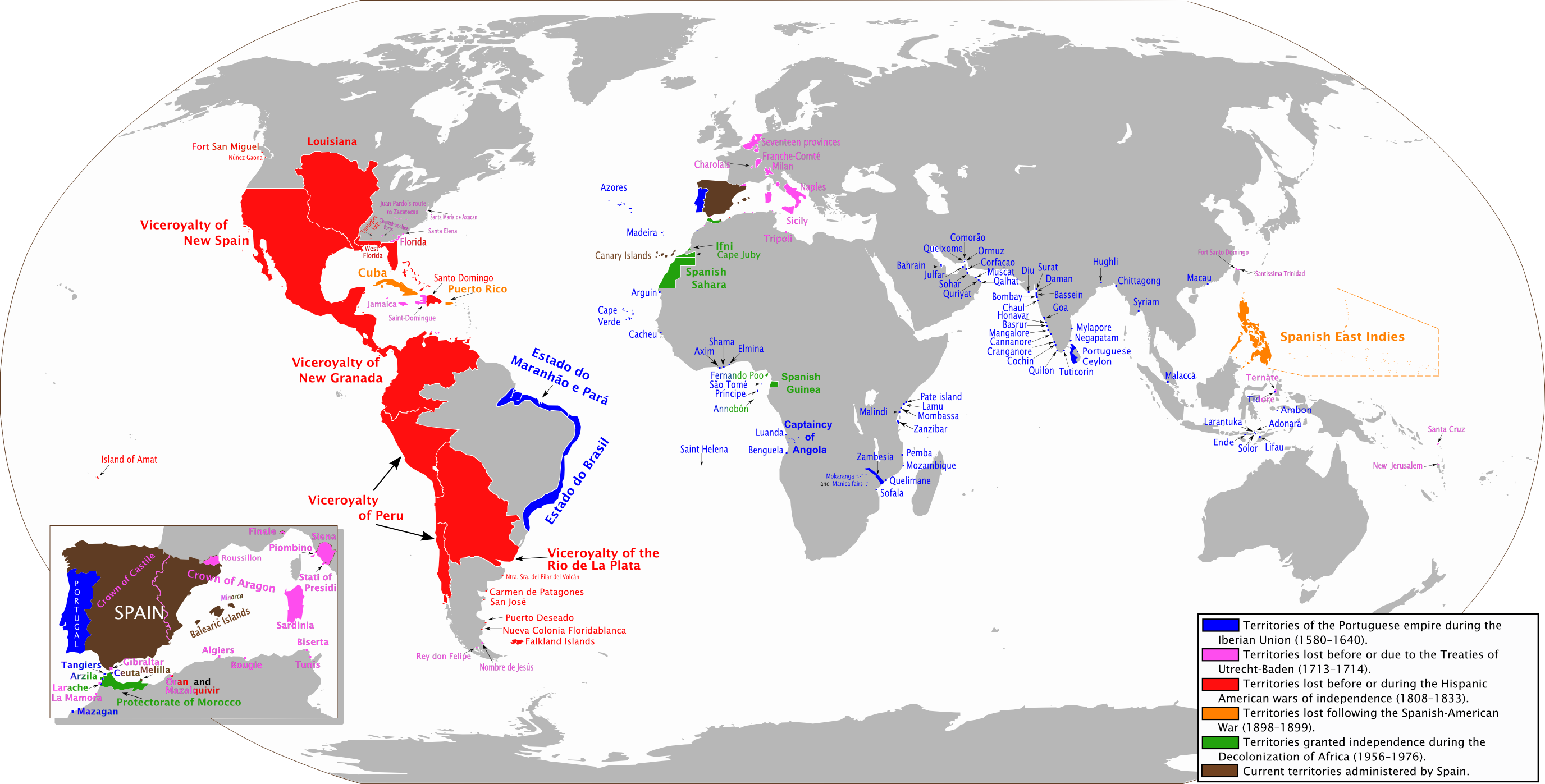
Subsequent to taking over Portugal's empire (in blue) from 1580 to 1640, these were areas of the world that at one time were territories (in red) of the Spanish Empire.

In a push to ensure stable economic growth, Europe turned to a capitalistic economy in the 15th and the early 16th centuries to replace the failed feudal system. Modern capitalism allowed for economies to extend beyond geographical and political boundaries and led to the formation of the first worldwide economic system. At the base of this world system was an international division of labor, which determined countries' relationships and placement within the categories of the world system: core, semi-periphery, periphery, and external. The core regions, most notably the countries of Northwestern Europe like England, France, and the Netherlands, gained the most from the world economy. Their ascension from previous peripheral and semi-peripheral status to the core was driven by the development of strong central government and military power, the combination of which made possible control of international commerce and exploitation of colonial possessions.

At the other end of the spectrum was the periphery, marked by lack of central government, exportation of raw materials to the core, and exploitive labor practices. In that time period, especially toward the late 17th century, South America and parts of North America stood out as peripheral zones under the control and capitalistic exploitation of core countries in Europe. Slaves and indigenous workers in those regions developed raw materials for export to Europe, a distinctive characteristic of the new capitalism, as goods were no longer produced solely for internal consumption. The aristocracy of those regions controlled commerce and became wealthy through the new world economy, which led to their rise in power above the government. Even in periods of upheaval, local aristocrats relied on core European powers to assist in keeping control over the economic system.

In between the core and the periphery was the semi-periphery, which constituted both previous core regions that had declined like Italy, Spain and Portugal, and peripheries that had improved their position, like southern Germany and southern France. Spain and Portugal had taken advantage of the opening to Atlantic control left by the decline of Italian powers like Genoa and Venice. Much like the core European powers, Spain and Portugal had strong navies and expansive colonial domains, which they exploited for their natural resources and cheap labor. Rather than using the increased wealth to develop strong domestic manufacturing sectors, like other Western European powers, Spain and Portugal used imported gold and silver to obtain manufactured goods from the core countries, which relegated them to semi-periphery, instead of core, status. They had control over several peripheral regions and exploited them, a characteristic of a core region, but those countries failed to develop the quality manufacturing industries and the access to international banking that further defined core countries, which left them a step below in the world system at semi-periphery status.

=== 1700–1875 ===
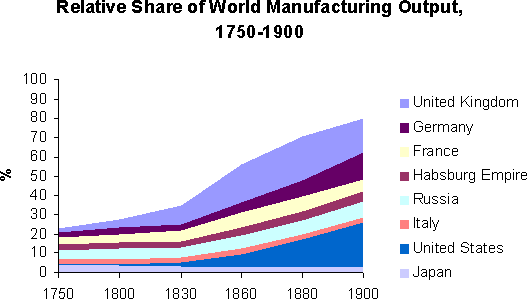
As the Industrial Revolution developed British manufactured output surged ahead of other economies.

The development of trade between Europe, the Americas, and the East generated massive profits for a relatively small merchant elite in the European colonial powers. Those merchants used their profits to take control of agriculture and other industries and further consolidated their power by extending control over internal markets and the prices of finished goods. The result was the development of the necessary capital to industrialize the European core states.

The era was defined by the transition from agriculture to industrialization. The rapid development of industry triggered several reactions. Many European states explored new territories in addition to their original colonial holdings for new markets to exploit. The European world system continued to expand and include more regions, as it absorbed the Indian Ocean economic system through the acquisition of colonies by Britain, France, Spain, and Portugal, among others. Previously-isolated regions, like much of the American interior zone, joined the newly-independent South American countries in becoming part of the periphery. By the 19th century, Asia and Africa had also entered the world system as peripheral regions. The development of Africa and Asia as peripheral continents allowed for new cores like the United States and Germany to improve their core status and to rise higher within the world system.

Throughout this time period, a constant shift within core regions came from a combination of agriculture and industry to solely industrial enterprise. England was the leader in industrial and agricultural production, but by 1900, only 10% of England's populace worked in agriculture, which demonstrated the shift to industry in England but across the core stratum. The dramatic shift to industry extended beyond the core by the end of this time period, as core regions encouraged the development of manufacturing in peripheral and semi-peripheral zones to further develop those markets and create demand for newly developed machines and other goods.

=== 1875–1914 ===
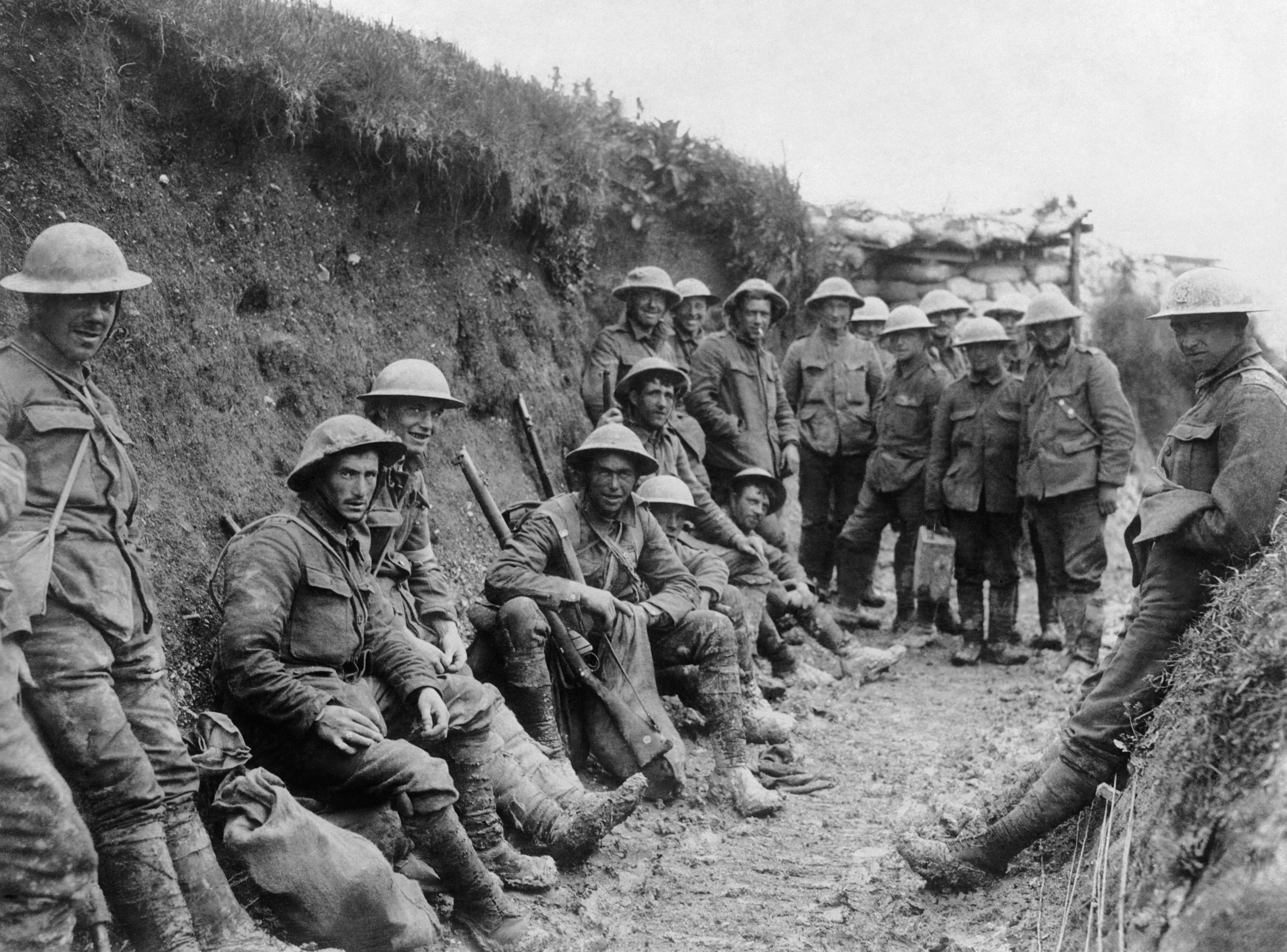
A ration party of the Royal Irish Rifles in a communication trench

The West represented both the core and the semi-periphery, as Europe dominated 80% of the world's market share. Much of the rest of the world was a diverse periphery though Japan was a notable exception. As expansionism continued, new core nations emerged, such as Great Britain, Germany, and the United States, and old cores such as Spain and Portugal faded to the semi-periphery. The growth of the power of the common man led to an expansion of thought concerning democracy, communism, and revolution, which pervaded the weaker semi-peripheral nations overcome with civil distress. In some cases, that led to the weakening of the nations, such as the violent revolution in France, which contributed to the adoption of totalitarian leaders, as seen in Germany and France. The major factors contributing to world war were the conflicts and power struggles taking place between the three classes of nations in the global system. Nations that were considered part of the semi-periphery felt oppressed by the stronger, larger core nations.

=== 1914–today ===
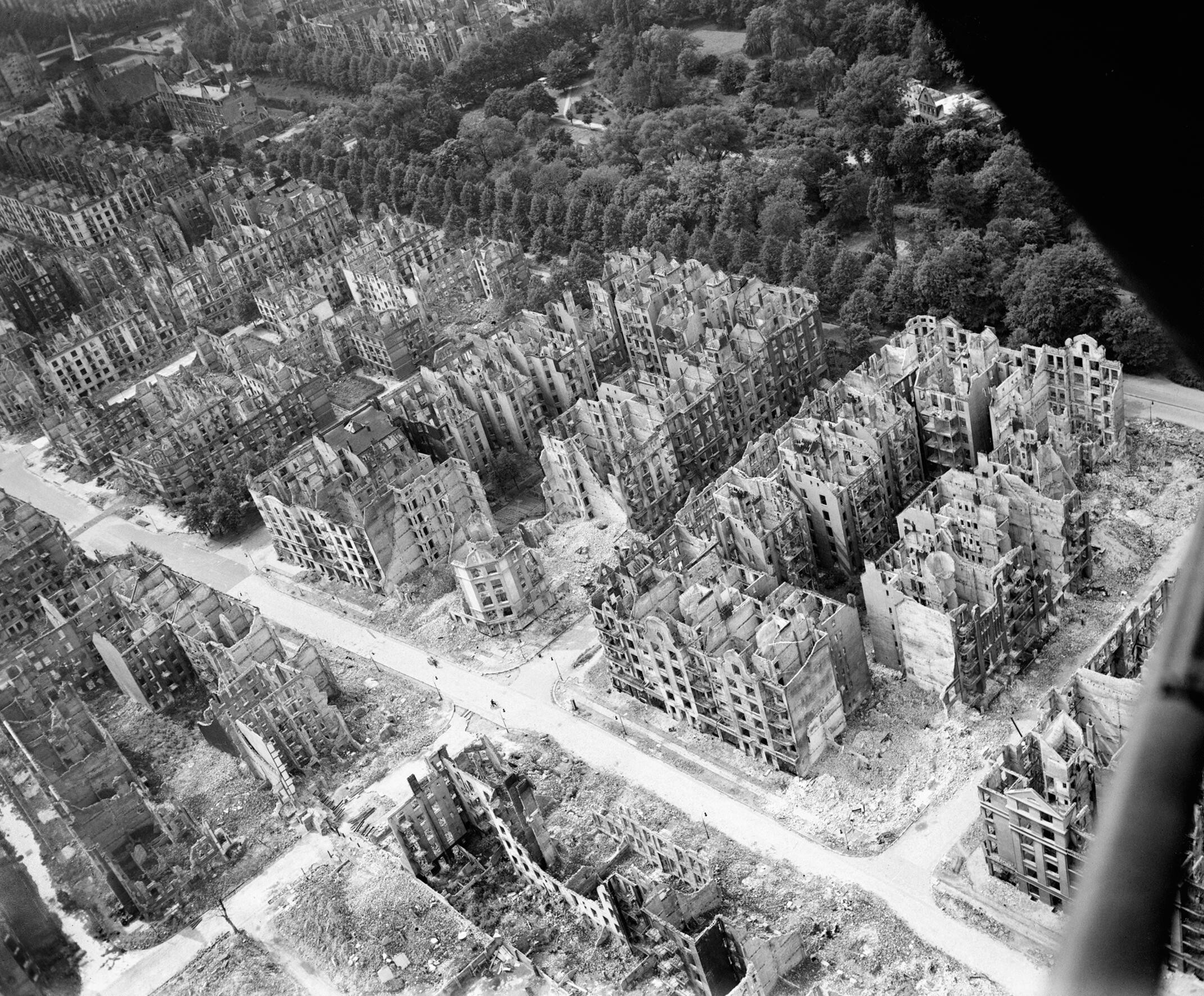
Burned-out buildings after the bombing of Hamburg in World War II

The trend is known to have continued throughout the 20th century, with Germany, the Soviet Union, and Japan also taking seats at the core. At the end of World War II, however, Germany quickly fell to the semi-periphery, along with war-ravaged France. As the rest of Europe struggled to rebuild itself, it also fell to the semi-periphery except for many Eastern European nations, which fell under the Eastern bloc. Japan also fell back into semi-periphery, along with China and India, until their recent upswing in influence. Change also came to North America, where American imperialism led to the rise of countries like Guatemala and the Dominican Republic. On the other side of the Pacific, Australia was also developed and helped secure an Allied victory in the war.

=== Today ===
Advanced economies Emerging and developing economies (not least developed) Emerging and developing economies (least developed) Classifications by the IMF and the UN (as of 2008)

World map indicating the category of Human Development Index by country (based on a 2014 update) Very High High Medium Low Data unavailable

In today's global hierarchy, some states are transitioning upward, and others are moving downward in terms of status and influence. Former colonial powers no longer exercise control over an international domain and are instead mostly relegated to their core; for example, former European world powers do not exert influence over colonial outposts in the Americas, Africa, or Asia but rather have consolidated their power in the form of the European Union. The new leading powers are mostly non-European (United States, Canada, Japan). Outside those developed countries are countries (see list below) that are considered semi-periphery and are both dominant and dominated within economic, political, and social realms. The middle powers are a combination of nations that have emerged as a result of the fragmentation of the Soviet Union and nations that have risen because of their possession of resources in high demand, like oil in Saudi Arabia. While those nations are by no means on the level of the stated world powers, they exert influence over the weaker nations of the impoverished Fourth World.

Other terms used to describe semi-periphery countries include sub-imperial and semi-industrial. Immanuel Wallerstein identifies three ways by which countries can emerge from the periphery into the semi-periphery. Countries with a large market and room for industrial growth, like Brazil, South Africa, and Mexico, and countries with valuable energy resources, like Iran and Saudi Arabia, can use the strategy of seizing the chance. The strategy of promotion by invitation can be utilized by countries willing to be open to foreign governmental and regional administrative centers. Examples of countries that used that strategy are the capitalist regimes in Africa like Egypt, Kenya, Nigeria, Zaire, Senegal, and Côte d'Ivoire. They use dependent development to integrate into the world economy and to establish local dominance. Outside those strategies is that of self-reliance, a basic theory that as some countries grow, others will decline. Many countries in Africa and South America have exhibited the qualities of a sub-imperial or semi-industrial power.

Wallerstein examines the role of semi-periphery countries during a period of economic downturn. To redefine core and periphery countries in an economic sense, core countries are characterized by advanced technology, high profits, high wages, and diversified production. Periphery countries have less technology, low profits, low wages, and less diversified production. Semi-periphery countries fall in the middle of those spectra, and their unique political and social structure place them in a position in which they can best take advantage of economic downturns.

The economic downturns occur because of increased supply and decreased demand, which combine to create a shift in surplus and power to the semi-periphery. Semi-periphery regions take advantage of the situation by expanding control of their home markets and the surrounding periphery countries at the expense of core countries. The underlying reason for the shift in power lies in the basic economic principle of scarcity. As long as core countries maintain scarcities of their goods, they can select customers from the semi-periphery and periphery countries that are competing over them. When excess supply occurs, the core countries are the ones competing over a smaller market. That competition allows semi-peripheral nations to select from among core countries, rather than vice versa, when they make decisions about commodity purchases, manufacturing investments, and sales of goods and shifts the balance of power to the semi-periphery.

In general, there is a power shift from core to semi-periphery in times of economic struggles, but there are few examples of semi-peripheral countries transitioning to core status. To accomplish that, semi-peripheral nations must take advantage of weaker core countries but also exploit any existing advantages over other semi-peripheral nations. How well they exploit these advantages determines their arrangement within the semi-periphery class.

== Effects ==
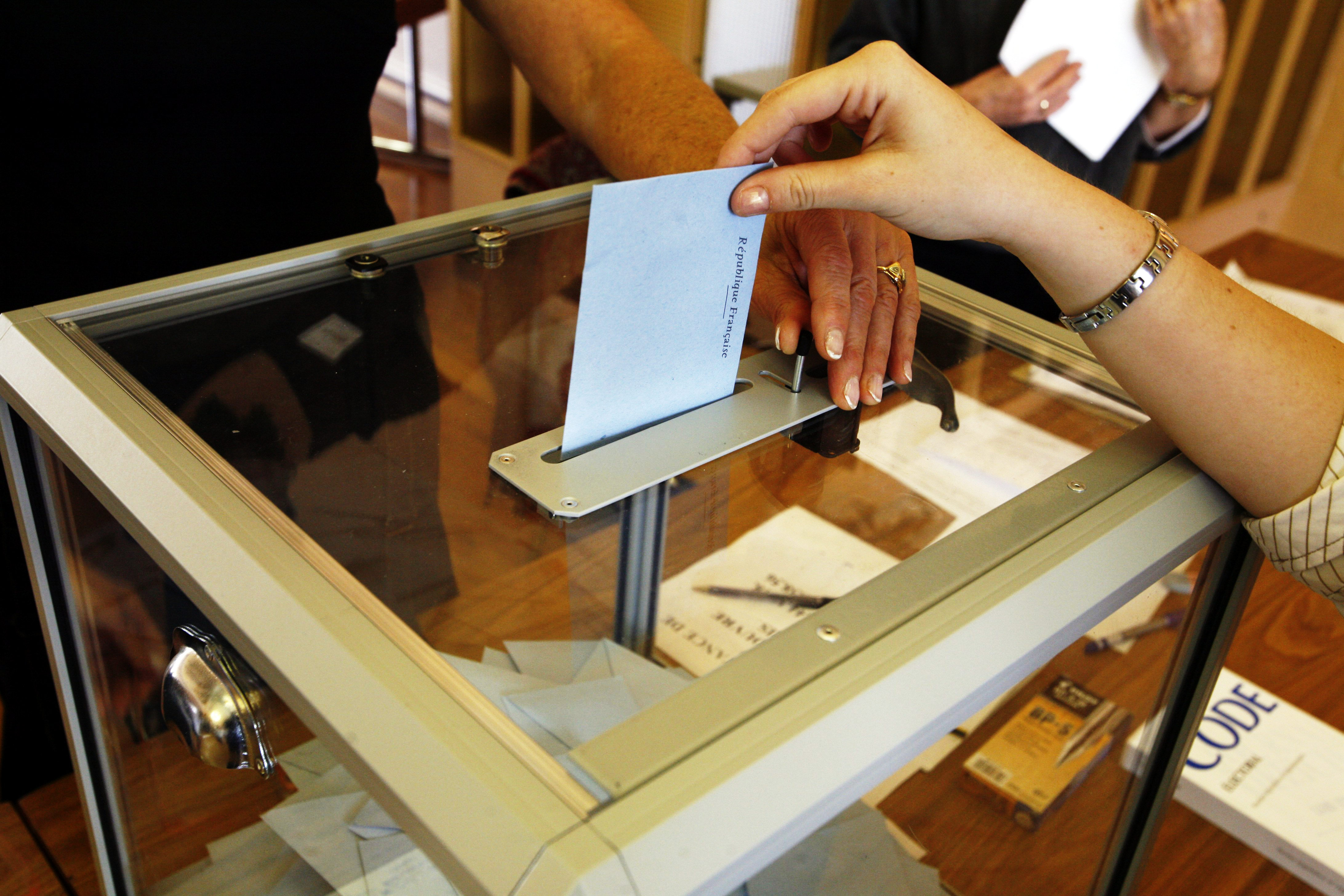
A ballot box

The semi-peripheral nations of the world have played an important role to world trade and interaction since early periods of globalized trade. The "middle ground" between the very powerful cores and the backwaters of the far periphery allowed those two zones to interact with greater ease. For example, during the 13th-century world system, the semi-periphery areas around Europe's Mediterranean Coast facilitated trade between the peripheries of the more manufacturing-based Northern Europe and the cores of India and China. John Markoff, a sociologist at the University of Pittsburgh, also notes that political developments, particularly in the advancement of democracy, originate in the semi-periphery. He notes that innovations in democracy came from the semi-periphery rather than the more established and stable nations in the First World, where profit discourages great reform, or the extremely poor periphery in the Third World, where instability makes reform too dangerous to attempt. It has been in semi-peripheral nations that democratic reforms like the expansion of suffrage and the institution of the secret ballot have been implemented.

== Lists of semi-periphery countries ==
The following are semi-periphery countries according to Wallerstein (1976).

Algeria	Argentina	Brazil	China	Egypt	Finland	Greece
India	Indonesia	Israel	Iran	Italy	Malaysia	Mexico
Norway	Poland	Portugal	Saudi Arabia	Singapore	South Korea	Spain
Nigeria	Taiwan	Turkey	Venezuela	Zaire		

The following are semi-periphery countries from an updated version of essays by Wallerstein (1997).

Algeria	Argentina	Austria	Brazil	Bulgaria	China	Cuba	Czech Republic
Democratic Republic of the Congo	Egypt	Finland	Greece	Hungary	India	Indonesia	Iran
Israel	Italy	Mexico	New Zealand	Nigeria	Norway	North Korea	Poland
Portugal	Romania	Saudi Arabia	South Africa	South Korea	Spain	Turkey	Ukraine
Uruguay	Venezuela	Vietnam					

The following are semi-periphery countries according to Dunn, Kawana, Brewer (2000).

Argentina	Brazil	China	Hong Kong	India
Indonesia	Iran	Israel	Macau	Mexico
Singapore	South Korea	South Africa	Taiwan	

Here is the semi-periphery listing according to Salvatore Babones (2005), who notes that his list is composed of countries that "have been consistently classified into a single one of the three zones [core, semi-periphery or periphery] of the world economy over the entire 28-year study period."

Belize	Brazil	Chile	Fiji	Hungary
Jamaica	Malaysia	Mexico	Panama	Seychelles
South Africa	Tunisia	Turkey	Uruguay	

== See also ==
- Agrowth
- American exceptionalism
- Civilizing mission
- Climate change
- Core-periphery
  - First World
  - Second World
  - Third World
  - Fourth World
- Critique of political economy
- Debt-to-GDP ratio
- Degrowth
- Development theory
- Export-oriented industrialization
- International development
  - Developed country
  - Developing country
  - Least developed countries
- Land reform
- List of countries by wealth per adult
- Non-Aligned Movement (NAM)
- North–South model
  - Global North and Global South
- Prosperity Without Growth
- Status quo
- Sufficiency economy
- Sustainability
- World-systems theory
- Sustainable development
- Thermoeconomics
- Theories of imperialism
  - Dependency theory
  - Neocolonialism
  - Three Worlds Theory
- Uneconomic growth
- Unified growth theory
- Universal basic income
- Wealth redistribution
- The White Man's Burden
- Women migrant workers from developing countries
- World view
