= Periphery countries =

Less developed, poorer countries

A world map of countries by their supposed trading status in 2000, using the world system differentiation into core countries (blue), semi-periphery countries (yellow) and periphery countries (red). Based on the list in Chase-Dunn, Kawana, and Brewer (2000).

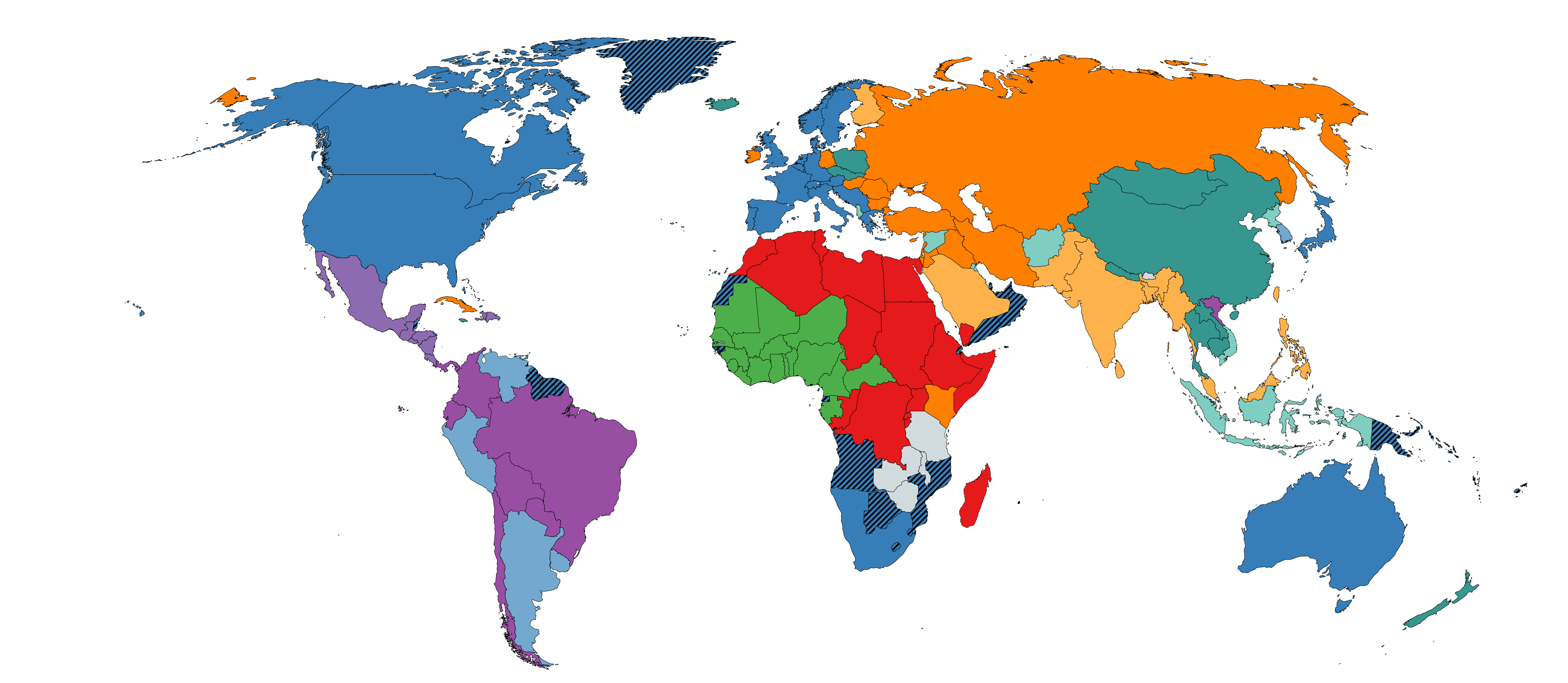
A world map of countries in 1965 colour-coded into 'blocks' based on trade, military interventions, diplomats and treaties: Block A Block B Block C & with dashed lines indicates colonies of Block C countries Block C' Block D Block D' Block E Block E' Block F Block F'

In world-systems theory, periphery countries are those that are less developed than the semi-periphery and core countries. These countries usually receive a disproportionately small share of global wealth. They have weak state institutions and are dependent on—and, according to some, exploited by—more developed countries. These countries are usually behind because of obstacles such as lack of technology, unstable government, and poor education and health systems. In some instances, the exploitation of periphery countries' agriculture, cheap labor, and natural resources aid core countries in remaining dominant. This is best described by dependency theory, which is one theory on how globalization can affect the world and the countries in it. It is, however, possible for periphery countries to rise out of their status and move into semi-periphery or core status. This can be done by doing things such as industrializing, stabilizing the government and political climate, etc.

== Background ==
Periphery countries are those that exist on the outer edges of global trade. There could be many reasons for a country to be considered peripheral. For example, some nations' customs and ports are so inefficient that even though they are geographically closer it is cheaper to ship goods from longer distances.

Usually a peripheral country will specialize in one particular industry, leaving it vulnerable to economic instability and limiting international investment. Sometimes countries decide to isolate themselves, such as 14th century China.

== Formation ==
There are a variety of reasons that periphery countries remain the way they are. One important factor that keeps countries in the periphery is the lack of development of technology. Another way periphery countries come to be is either the lack of a central government or the periphery country is under the control of another country. Periphery countries are known for exporting raw goods to core countries. What tends to happen is the maximum gain a periphery nation could earn is less than needed to maintain an equilibrium between costs and revenues. One thing periphery nation could do is to stop the increase of exports. At the beginning of the 19th century, Asia and Africa were considered periphery and their lack of development enabled the United States and Germany to remain successful core nations.

Although periphery nations are exploited by core countries, there is a purpose to the unequal exchanges of goods. For instance, the core countries have an incentive to gain a profit and this enables the world market to further grow. At times, there is a change in the balance of trade between the periphery and core countries. In this case, the governments of the periphery nation are affected in several ways. For instance, there is an increase in unemployment as well as a decrease in state income. This type of interaction is unique because the core country involved is somewhat weaker than normal. An example of this occurring is the growth of the industrial capabilities of Italy and Russia towards the end of the 19th century. This has also occurred in other periphery nations such as Brazil, Mexico, and South Africa.

== History ==
=== 15th century and 16th century ===
The world-system of the 15th and 16th centuries was very different from the world-system of today. Several areas were beginning to develop into trading powers, but none were able to gain total control. For this reason, a core and periphery developed in each region as opposed to a global scale. Cities began to become the "core" with the more agricultural countryside becoming a sort of "periphery". The most underdeveloped region that was still involved in trade at the time was Europe. It had the weakest core and periphery areas.

Two examples of periphery countries in the late 15th century and early 16th century are Poland and Latin America. At this time, Poland was mainly exporting wheat to other areas of Europe and Poland wanted cheap labor. As a result, landlords enslaved rural workers on their estate lands. Also, Latin America experienced an enslavement of their natives and imports of slaves from Africa. Forced mining labor was placed on the slaves, which enabled Latin America to export cheap goods to Europe. Both Poland and Latin America were similar during this time period because the aristocrats of these areas became more wealthy due to their interactions with the world economy. These areas of the world were also different from medieval times in Europe. They are different because during the late 15th century and early 16th century, Poland and Latin America were producing goods and exporting them rather than simply consuming their raw goods.

== Interactions ==
The relationship that the periphery countries have with the core countries is one that is defined by the exploitation of the periphery countries by the core countries. As many countries began to industrialize they looked for cheap goods and products. These industrialized "core" countries would then look to the less developed "periphery" countries for cheap goods. In most cases it is much easier and inexpensive to get these goods from other countries. Core countries realized this and began to use these cheap resources.

For the core countries to remain at the core, it is necessary that the periphery countries keep producing these cheap goods and remain mostly agricultural while the core countries are able to get goods very cheaply from the periphery and then are able to manufacture products and sell them at a relatively high price. The periphery countries are unable to make any gains because of this relationship and it is therefore impossible for them to ever industrialize. It is argued that if these countries are never able to industrialize, they will continue to remain on the periphery.

=== Imperialism's effect on core-periphery interactions ===
The current relationship between core countries and periphery countries was mostly defined in the era of imperialism that occurred in the late 19th through the early 20th centuries. It was at this time that the countries with the strongest economies and military forces began to exploit those countries with weaker states. A result of this exploitation was the tendency of underdeveloped states or colonies to move more towards the production of one type of export that would then come to dominate their land, territory and lifestyle economy. Some examples of the time include Brazil's coffee production and Cuba's cigar production.

== Economic possibilities ==
Periphery countries are continuously exploited by countries due to the exportation of surpluses of raw goods to the more technologically industrialized core countries for manufacturing and distribution. Recently some of the manufacturing has been moved to periphery countries but it is still controlled and owned by the core countries. There are, however, ways in which periphery countries can rise from their poor status and become semi-periphery countries or even core countries. It is crucial for the core countries to keep exploiting the natural resources of the periphery countries and to keep the governments semi-stable or else it could cause economic unrest for the core countries as a whole.

=== Ways to improve ===
There are several ways in which periphery countries are able to escape their poor status. Some of these ways are stabilizing their governments, becoming more industrialized and using natural resources to benefit themselves rather than core countries, and creating a better education system. Developing a banking system that can compete on a global scale is also another way in which periphery countries can help better themselves in the global market.

==== Stabilized government ====
One main way in which a periphery country can rise to semi-periphery or core status is through the stabilization of its government. A country with a dictatorship type government is much easier to exploit and corrupt than one with a well-organized, elected government and core countries use this to their advantage. Political unrest is usually a cause for military action from the core countries in order to protect their interests and keep a cooperative dictator or government in power.

Once the citizens of these countries become exploited enough, they can stage a coup in order to overthrow their government and put someone who they feel will help the country into power. If this is done successfully and the new leader is stays true to his/her word, the country can take the next necessary step in rising from periphery status and that is to start to industrialize.

Some Neo-Marxists believe that it would actually be best for periphery countries to cut all economic and political ties with the core countries. This would, in their opinion, allow the periphery countries to develop and industrialize at their own pace instead of being exploited and driven by core countries demands. Doing this would allow these countries to spend their money on industrializing and bettering themselves, rather than importing goods from core countries. It also would allow these countries to become more independent from the core countries, causing them to move to semi-peripheral status.

==== Industrializing ====
Most periphery countries rely almost entirely on agriculture and other natural resources such as oil, coal, and diamonds in order to gain some sort of profit, but this also keeps them from growing economically. In order for them to grow they must industrialize in order to produce finished goods for exportation around the world, instead of allowing the core countries to profit from their natural resources. Industrializing and adapting newer technology is one of the major ways in which periphery countries can begin to raise their standard of living and help increase the wealth of their citizens. Becoming industrialized also will help to force trade to come to their cities, if they can produce goods at competitive prices, allowing them to reach out to the global market and take hold. Once a periphery country can industrialize, and use its own resources to its own benefit, it will begin to enter semi-periphery status.

In order for a periphery country to industrialize, it must first undergo proto-industrialization. In this stage, a market-based economy begins to form, normally in rural areas, using agricultural products. Proto-industrialization also helps to organize the rural market in this country and allows for them to become more capitalistic. Finally, once these countries develop this style of economy, they can begin to build factories and machines.

==== Education ====
One of the final steps for a periphery country to rise to semi-periphery or core status is to educate its citizens. Raising the literacy rate allows ideas to spread more quickly through a country and also allows people to better communicate with themselves and the rest of the world. Also, once universities are developed, a country can begin to research new technology. Researching new technology can help a country to better compete in the global market by becoming more efficient or selling new technology and industrial techniques. If education and industry become developed enough, it is entirely possible for a periphery country to rise to core country status and become a leader in the global market. Another way in which periphery countries better their education system is by spending money to send university-level students and staff abroad to places such as the U.S. and Europe to receive a better education.

Once the people in these countries have become educated enough and they realize their place in the world economy, they can also demand help from the core countries. Although unlikely, due to the fact that the core countries rely on the exploitation of the periphery, there have been pushes for core countries to help better the periphery countries. Some of the ideas suggested are to help aid the periphery countries in developing by exploiting them less, help the periphery countries lose some of their debt and raise the prices on goods coming from these countries to allow them to be more profitable. These policies are obviously not beneficial to the core countries and is mostly why they have never been adapted successfully but this is another way in which the periphery could rise to a higher status.

=== Examples ===
==== Russia ====
During the early 20th century, the economy of the Russian Empire was a primarily agrarian country with isolated pockets of heavy industries. The Empire fell in 1917; the core of its industrial workers shrank from 3.6 million in 1917 to 1.5 million in 1920. After the end of the Russian Civil War the Soviet Union industrialized under the rule of Joseph Stalin. Industrialization peaked in 1929–1932 in a rapid campaign described as "a revolution from above". Former personal private farms were collectivized in the early 1930s and gradually supplied with tractors and other machinery. Mechanization of farm labor, among other factors, contributed to freeing up workers for the newly built factories. In 1928–1932 alone at least 10 million peasants migrated to the cities, causing "an unprecedented demographic upheaval". Industrialization allowed the country to trade in the global trade market. By the 1950s and 60s, only about 30 years after it began to industrialize, the Soviet Union was considered by most scholars a core country along with the United States.

=== Adaptation ===
Once a periphery country rises up to core countries status it can be more dependent on other periphery countries for natural resources. They may also start to exploit other periphery countries to gain the advantages themselves. One of the biggest impacts of this rise is the direct effect for individuals in those nations. Health care is one of the first major improvements these countries would face, people would no longer die from diseases such as malaria and will better as treated for non-communicable diseases. Education is also one of many way in which the citizens would benefit. As a country becomes developed, It becomes capable of establishing new schools and better funding the schools already built. This was seen in Russia after the October Revolution. A better educated public adapt to the workforce, and influence countries to technological breakthroughs in industry and manufacturing. These countries could face with the economic on the global scale.

== List of periphery countries ==
Periphery countries as listed in the appendix of "Trade Globalization Since 1795: Waves of Integration in the World-System" that appeared in the American Sociological Review (Dunn, Kawana, Brewer (2000).

Afghanistan	Albania		Angola	
Azerbaijan	Bahamas	Bahrain	Bangladesh	Barbados
Belarus	Belize	Benin	Bhutan	Bolivia
Bosnia and Herzegovina	Botswana		Burkina Faso	Burundi
Cambodia	Cameroon	Cape Verde	Central African Republic	Chad
Chile	Colombia	Comoros	Democratic Republic of the Congo	Congo
Costa Rica	Cote d'Ivoire		Cuba	Cyprus
Czech Republic	Djibouti	Dominican Republic	Ecuador	
El Salvador	Equatorial Guinea	Eritrea	Estonia	Ethiopia
Gabon	Gambia	Georgia	Ghana	Greece
Guatemala	Guinea	Guinea-Bissau	Guyana	Haiti
Honduras	Hungary		Iraq	Jamaica
Jordan	Kazakhstan	Kenya		Kyrgyzstan
Laos	Latvia	Lebanon	Lesotho	Liberia
Libya	Lithuania	Macedonia	Madagascar	Malawi
Malaysia	Maldives	Mali	Mauritania	Mauritius
Moldova	Mongolia	Morocco	Mozambique	Myanmar
Namibia	Nepal	Nicaragua	Niger	Nigeria
Oman	Pakistan	Panama	Papua New Guinea	Paraguay
Peru	Philippines			Rwanda
	Sao Tome and Principe		Senegal	Seychelles
Sierra Leone	Slovakia		Somalia	Sri Lanka
Sudan	Suriname	Syrian Arab Republic	Tanzania	Thailand
Togo	Trinidad and Tobago	Tunisia	Turkey	Turkmenistan
Uganda			Uruguay	Uzbekistan
Venezuela	Vietnam	Yemen	Zambia	Zimbabwe

According to Salvatore Babones (2005), the periphery includes the following states. Babones notes that this list is composed of countries that "have been consistently classified into a single one of the three zones [core, semi-periphery or periphery] of the world economy over the entire 28-year study period".

Bangladesh	Benin	Bolivia	Burkina Faso	Burundi
Central African Republic	Chad	Chile		Congo
Gambia	Ghana	Guinea-Bissau	Haiti	Honduras
	Indonesia	Kenya	Lesotho	Madagascar
Malawi		Nepal	Niger	Nigeria
Papua New Guinea	Philippines	Rwanda	Senegal	Sierra Leone
Solomon Islands	Sri Lanka	Sudan	Togo	Zambia

== See also ==
- Agrowth
- American exceptionalism
- Civilizing mission
- Climate change
- Core-periphery
  - First World
  - Second World
  - Third World
  - Fourth World
- Critique of political economy
- Debt-to-GDP ratio
- Degrowth
- Development theory
- Export-oriented industrialization
- International development
  - Developed country
  - Developing country
  - Least developed countries
- Land reform
- List of countries by wealth per adult
- Non-Aligned Movement (NAM)
- North–South model
  - Global North and Global South
- Prosperity Without Growth
- Status quo
- Sufficiency economy
- Sustainability
- Sustainable development
- Thermoeconomics
- Theories of imperialism
  - Dependency theory
  - Neocolonialism
  - Three Worlds Theory
- Uneconomic growth
- Unified growth theory
- Universal basic income
- Wealth redistribution
- The White Man's Burden
- Women migrant workers from developing countries
- World view
