= Core countries =

Industrialized/developed countries

A world map of countries by their supposed trading status in 2000, using the world system differentiation into core countries (blue), semi-periphery countries (yellow) and periphery countries (red). Based on the list in Chase-Dunn, Kawana, and Brewer (2000).

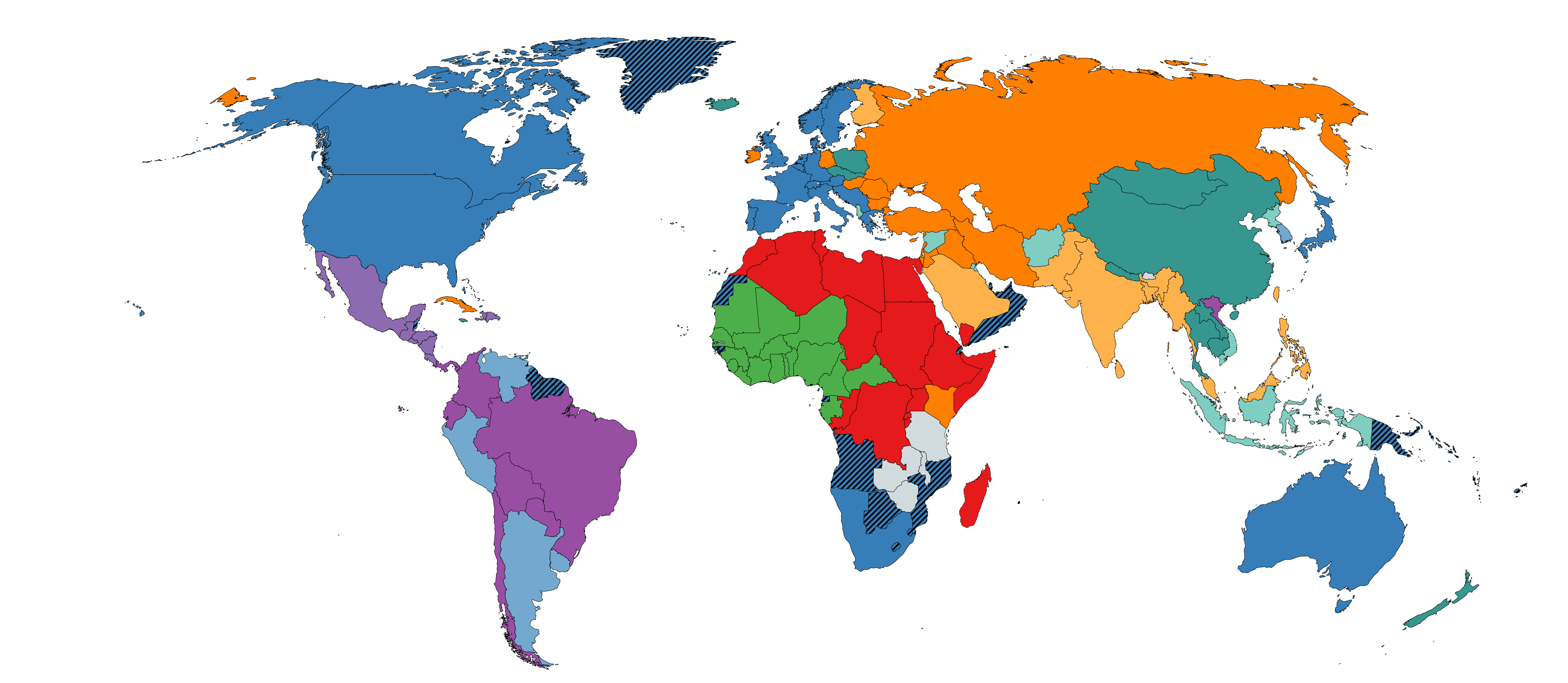
A world map of countries in 1965 colour-coded into 'blocks' based on trade, military interventions, diplomats and treaties: Block A Block B Block C and with dashed lines indicates colonies of Block C countries Block C' Block D Block D' Block E Block E' Block F Block F'

In world-systems theory, core countries (or the imperial core) are the industrialized capitalist and/or imperialist countries. Core countries control and benefit the most resources from the global market. They are usually recognized as wealthy states with a wide variety of resources and are in a favorable location compared to other states. They have strong state institutions, a powerful military, and powerful global political alliances. In the 20th-21st centuries they consist of Australia, New Zealand, Canada, Western European countries, Japan, the United Kingdom, and the United States. The population of the core countries is on average by far the wealthiest of the world, with the highest life expectancy, literacy rate, best education and social welfare on the planet.

Core countries do not always stay "core" permanently. Throughout world history, core countries have been changing, and new ones have been added to the "core" list. These were the Asian, Indian, and Middle Eastern empires in the ages up to the 16th century; prominently Medieval India and the Chinese Empire, which were the richest regions in the world until the European Great Powers took the lead during the early modern period, although the major Asian powers were still very influential in the region. Europe remained ahead of the pack until the 20th century, when the two World Wars were disastrous for the European economies. It was then that the victorious United States and Soviet Union, up to the late 1980s, became the two hegemonic powers, creating a bipolar world order during the Cold War. In 1991, the collapse of the Soviet Union left the United States as the world's sole remaining superpower, sometimes referred to as a hyperpower.

== Definition ==
Core countries control and profit the most from the world socio-economic and political system, and thus they are the "core" of the world economic system. These countries can exercise control over other countries or groups of countries by military, economic, and political means.

In the 20th–21st centuries, Australia, New Zealand, Canada, Western European countries, Japan, the United Kingdom, and the United States are considered examples of present core countries that have the most power in the world economic system.

== Throughout history ==
=== Pre–13th century ===
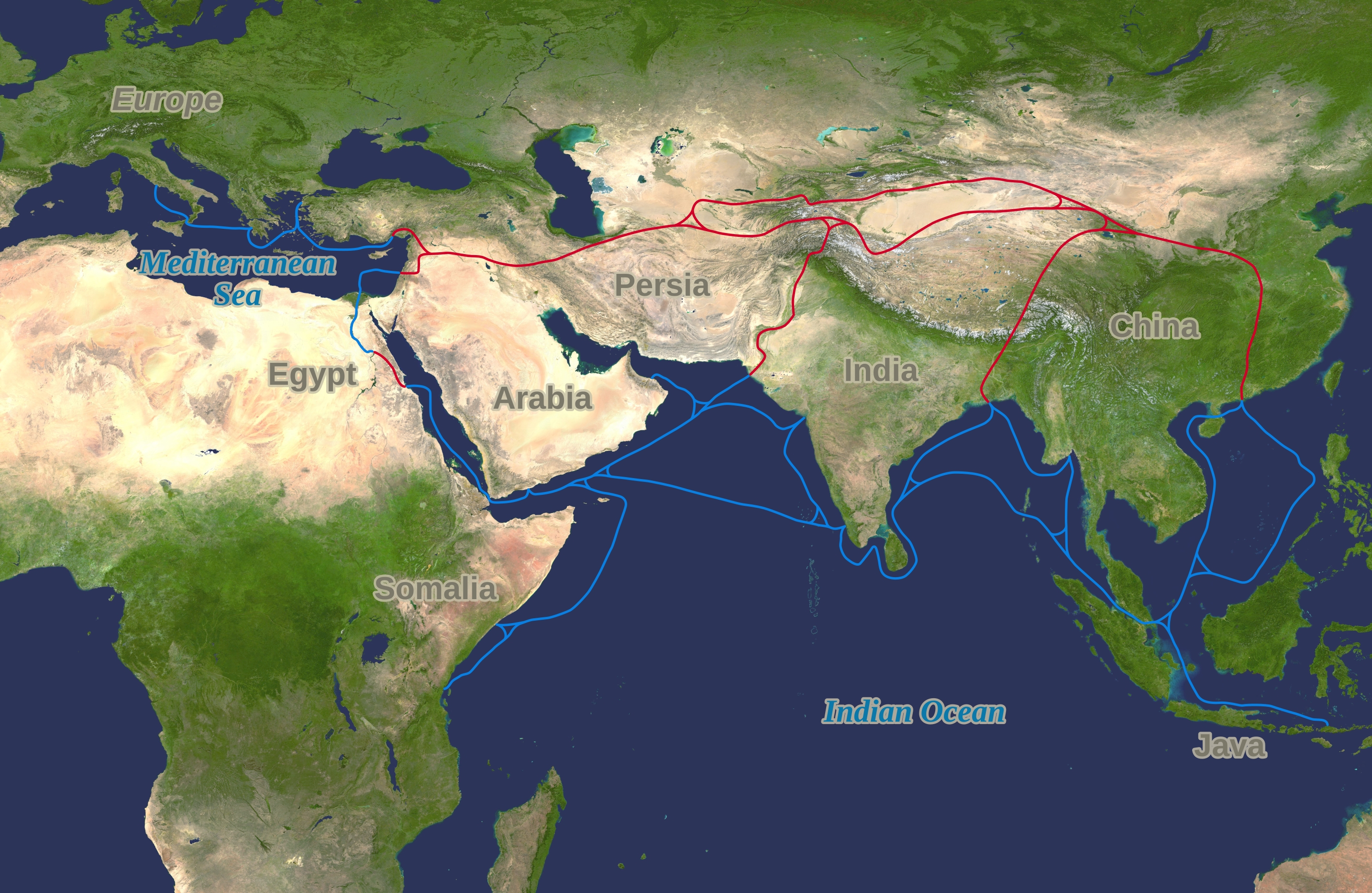
The Silk Road extending from Southern Europe through Arabia, Somalia, Egypt, Persia, the Middle East, Central Asia, the Indian subcontinent, and Southeast Asia until it reaches the Chinese Empire (land routes are red, water routes are blue).

In Asia, the Chinese Empire was considered the "Middle Kingdom" and controlled the region. The two empires communicated and traded through the Silk Road, which takes its name from the extensive trade of Chinese silk. The period of Imperial China lasted more than two millennia, connecting ancient and modern history. Although Chinese dynasties or empires rose and fell during those centuries, including during periods of strife and war, Imperial China endured with remarkable constancy. The defining characteristics of all Chinese empires were their large scale and the diversity of their peoples.

Originally emerged as a loose collection of various Han Chinese-speaking entities during the Warring States period, the Qin's wars of unification brought most of the Huaxia realm into one single dynasty, establishing Qin as the first imperial dynasty in 221 BCE, the year where the first Chinese Empire was established. Imperial China would continue to expand even after the collapse of the Qin dynasty, with the Han dynasty expanding to the north, south and west. During the Tang dynasty four centuries later, China achieved a golden age in terms of its economic, military and political power. Tang's territory spanned Central Asia, Northeast Asia, and parts of Southeast Asia, until the dynasty ended following the An Lushan rebellion in the 8th century CE. Imperial China marked its revival under the Mongol-based Yuan dynasty, when Inner Asian territories such as Tibet and Mongolia were incorporated. The Qing dynasty, founded three centuries after the fall of the Yuan dynasty, laid ground to most of China's modern border with its re-expansion into Inner Asia.

Until the 13th century Medieval India, often referred to as "Greater India", extended its religious, cultural, and trading influence on vast Asian regions, from Persia and Central Asia to Cambodia, Indonesia, the Malaysian Archipelago, and Sri Lanka. With Buddhism and Hinduism, two of the most followed religions in Asia and the world as a whole, having originated there, India's cultural impact spread throughout Asia. A notable example is Imperial China, where Buddhism became the prominent religion. Sanskrit was a prominent scholarly language in all the Southeastern kingdoms until the 10th century CE. Angkor Wat in Cambodia, the largest temple complex in the world, was originally a Hindu temple and later transformed into a Buddhist monastery.

=== Middle Ages to the early modern period ===
==== Mongol Empire ====
Expansion of the Mongol Empire (1206–1368)

The Pax Mongolica is a particularly important period which started in 1206 and ended, according to contradicting sources, between late 14th and early 15th centuries. The trade during this period took on a truly multi-continental dimension, efficient and safe trade routes were established, and many of the modern rules of trade were emerging. The Mongol Empire was the largest contiguous empire in world history. It stretched from as far east as Medieval China all the way to the Eurasian Steppe, taking up large parts of Central Asia, the Middle East, and the Indian subcontinent.

Many trade routes went through the Mongol territories, even though they were not the easiest ones to travel, due to the rough Asian terrain. Yet, they attracted many merchants, because these routes were relatively cheap and safe to travel. The Mongols controlled their territories through military force and taxation. In many former regions of the Mongol Empire, its rule is remembered as brutal and destructive to this day. Yet, some argue that many economic and cultural improvements were made during the Mongol rule.

==== Arab and Middle Eastern empires ====
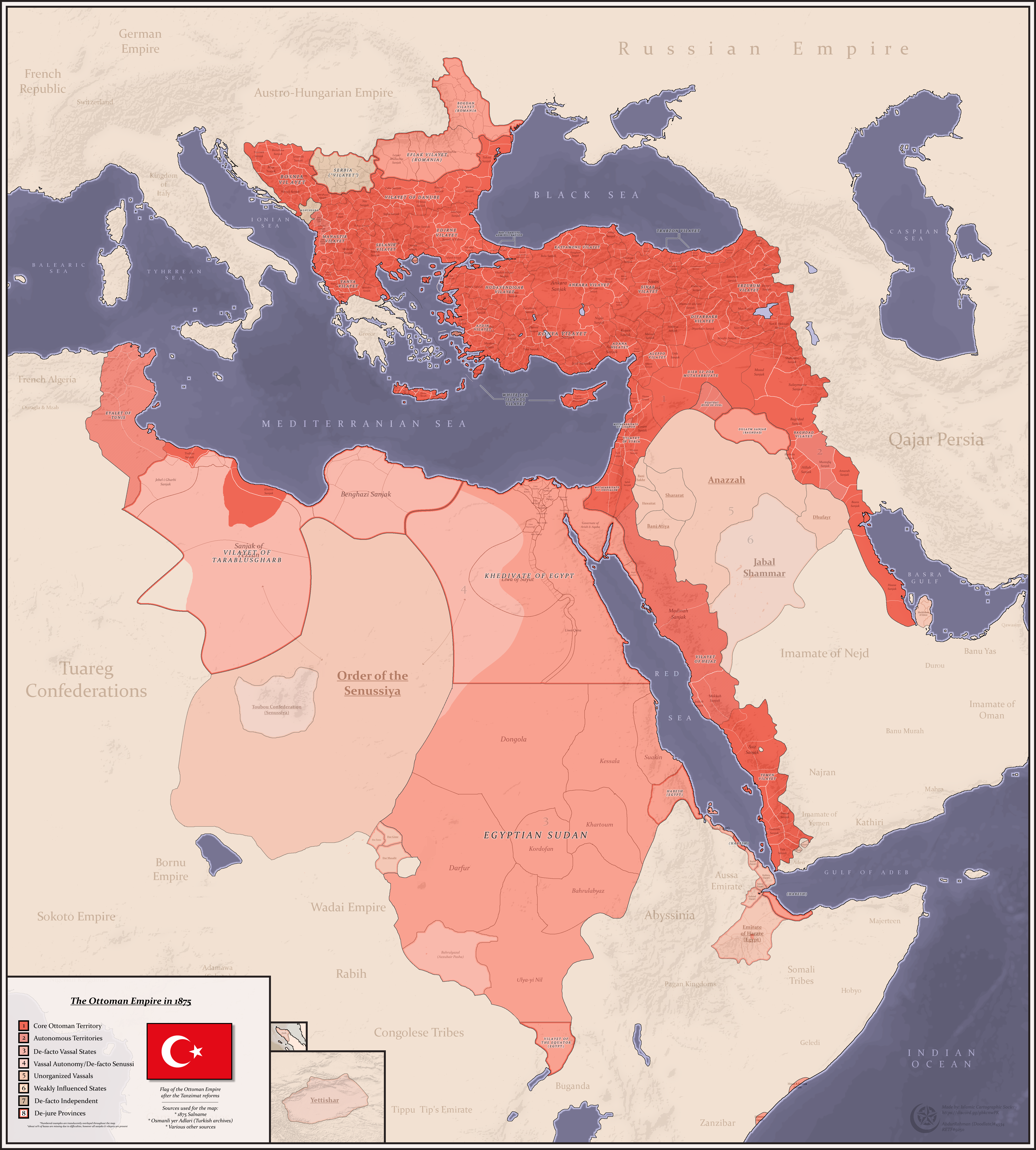
Territorial extent of the Ottoman Empire in 1875, right before the Great Eastern Crisis

The Ottoman Empire, which emerged in 1299, quickly became a power to be reckoned with. By 1450, the Ottoman Empire took up the connecting territory between the Black and Mediterranean seas. Despite lasting three times longer than the Mongol Empire, the Ottoman Empire never came to be anywhere near as expansive.

The Arab slave trade supplied the early Muslim conquests throughout the Arab-Muslim world from the 7th to the 20th centuries, peaking in the 18th and 19th centuries. This term, which covers the Arab-Muslim slave trade, is symmetrical with the term "Western slave trade", which refers to the triangular trade on the Western coasts of Africa that supplied the European colonization of the Americas, and which includes the Atlantic slave trade.

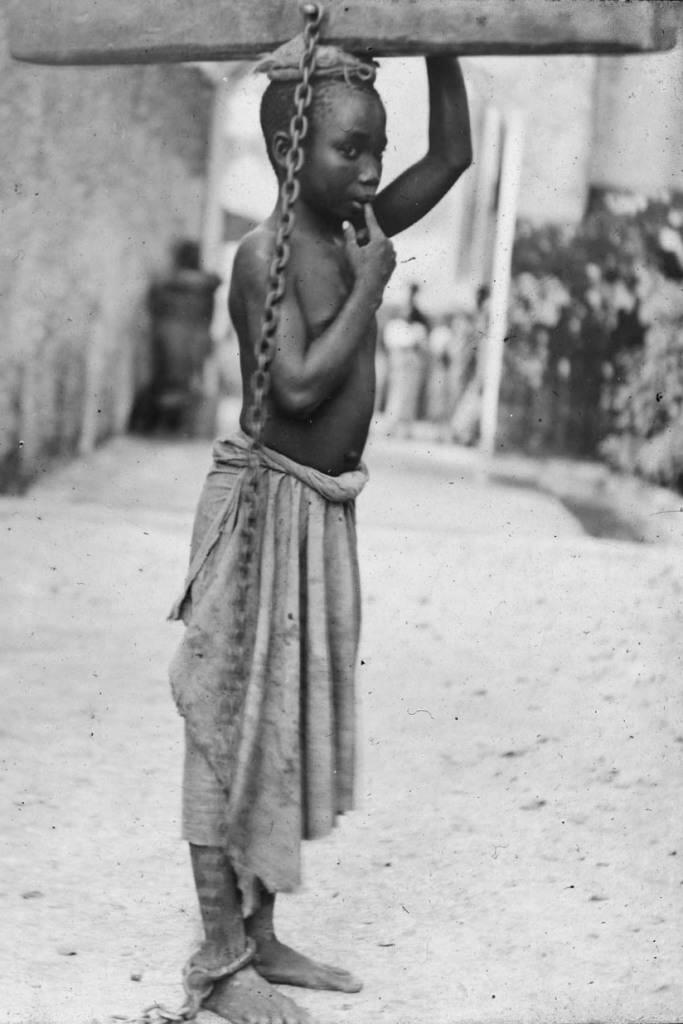
A photograph of a slave boy in the Sultanate of Zanzibar: An Arab master's punishment for a slight offence (c. 1890). From at least the 1860s onwards, photography was a powerful weapon in the abolitionist arsenal.

The slaves of the Eastern slave trade came mainly from Sub-Saharan Africa, Northwestern Africa, Southern Europe, Slavic countries, the Caucasus, and the Indian subcontinent, and were imported by the Arab-Muslim slave traders into the Middle East and North Africa, the Horn of Africa, and the islands of the Indian Ocean. For centuries, Arab-Muslim slave traders took and transported an estimated 10 to 15 million native Africans to slavery throughout the Arab-Muslim world. They also enslaved Europeans (known as Saqaliba), as well as Caucasian and Turkic peoples, from coastal areas of the Mediterranean Region, the Balkans, Central Asia, and the Eurasian steppes.

The slave trade in the Ottoman Empire supplied the ranks of the Ottoman army between the 15th and 19th centuries. They were useful in preventing both the slave rebellions and the breakup of the Empire itself, especially due to the rising tide of nationalism among European peoples in its Balkan provinces from the 17th century onwards. Along with the Balkans, the Black Sea Region remained a significant source of high-value slaves for the Ottomans. Throughout the 16th to 19th centuries, the Barbary States sent pirates to raid nearby parts of Europe in order to capture Christian slaves to sell at slave markets in the Muslim world, primarily in North Africa and the Ottoman Empire, throughout the Renaissance and early modern period. According to historian Robert Davis, from the 16th to 19th centuries, Barbary pirates captured 1 million to 1.25 million Europeans as slaves, although these numbers are disputed. These slaves were captured mainly from the crews of captured vessels, from coastal villages in Spain and Portugal, and from farther places like the Italian Peninsula, France, or England, the Netherlands, Ireland, the Azores Islands, and even Iceland. For a long time, until the early 18th century, the Crimean Khanate maintained a massive slave trade with the Ottoman Empire and the Middle East. The Crimean Tatars frequently mounted raids into the Danubian Principalities, Poland–Lithuania, and Russia to enslave people whom they could capture.

The 18th century was profoundly marked by the profitability of the Atlantic slave trade, which played a significant role in the economic development of contemporary core countries in Europe and the Americas. The widespread exploitation of enslaved Africans in the early 16th century was started by the Portuguese. This practice was embraced by many of today's core countries, such as the United States, United Kingdom, France, and the Netherlands, until the late 19th century.

Slavery existed in Africa prior to Europeans' capitalization on the practice, with Africans sometimes engaging in the sale of enslaved people. However, those enslaved and sold by Africans were usually prisoners of war or criminals, which European trading companies embraced as a convenient supply of human capital. Additionally, chattel slavery, where an enslaved person is considered property, was not a common practice among Africans at the time and peaked due to widespread implementation in the Americas. Because of the explosion of the Atlantic slave trade, many African nations experienced irreparable damage to their economies and societies as a whole. Meanwhile, this trade of humans was incredibly profitable for core countries, with estimates that the United States alone saw over $14 trillion worth of profit from enslaved Africans' labor.

=== Modern era ===
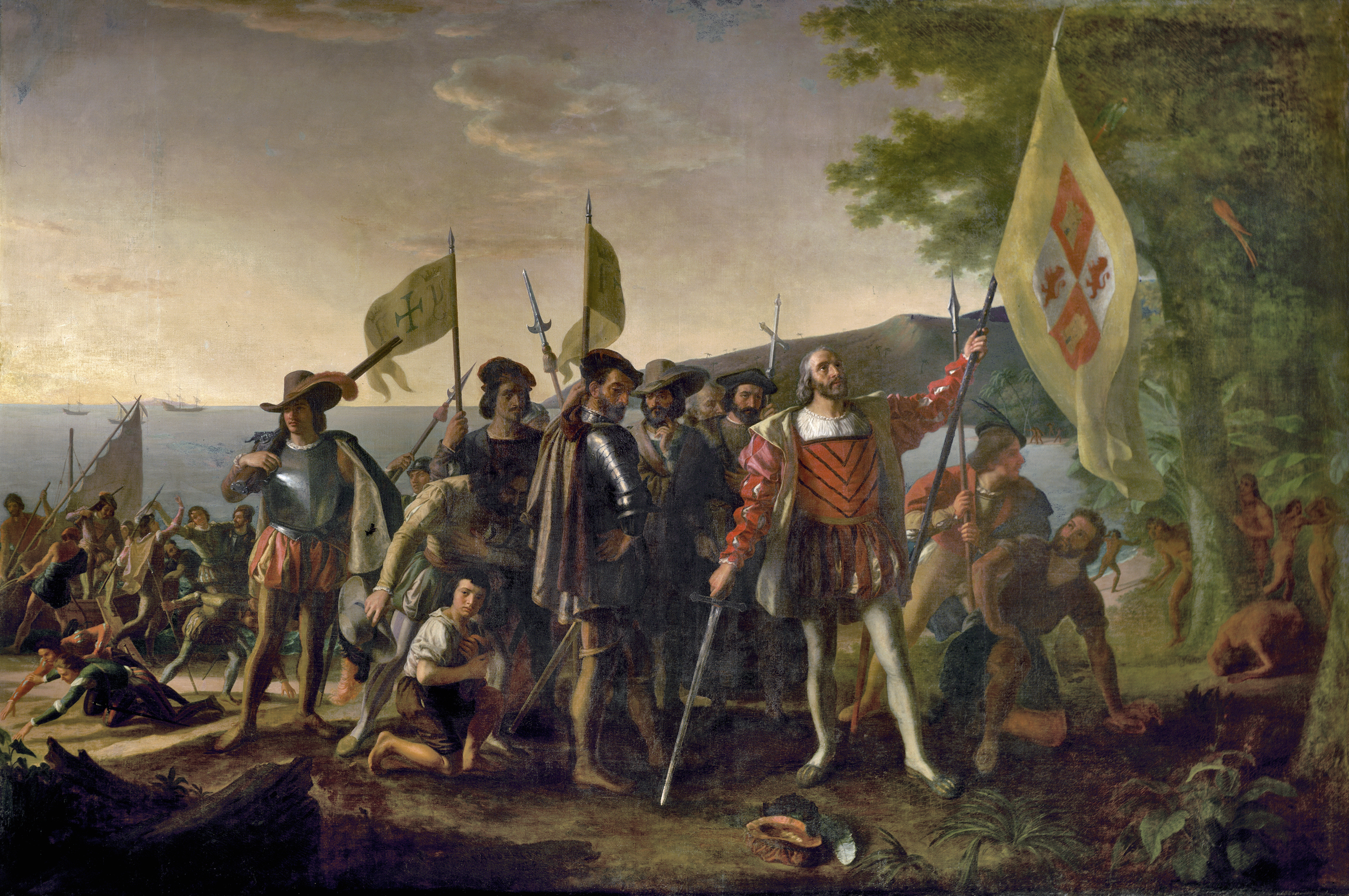
Landing of Columbus by John Vanderlyn, 1847. Christopher Columbus and his Spanish crew making their first landfall in the Americas in 1492

As states continued to grow technologically, especially through printing journals and newspapers, communication was more widespread. Thus, the global society was united through this force. In order to assure a good life for their citizens, countries needed to rely on trade and on technological advancements, which ultimately determined how well in the world a country stood.

Keeping in mind the interactions of states in this period, John W. Cell notes in his essay entitled "Europe and the World in an Expanding World Economy, 1700—1850", that war and trade were somewhat dependent on each other. States had to defend their ships while also establishing territories elsewhere to ensure successful trade for themselves. By the middle of the 17th century, the "foundations of the modern world system had been laid."

==== Rise and eventual European hegemony ====
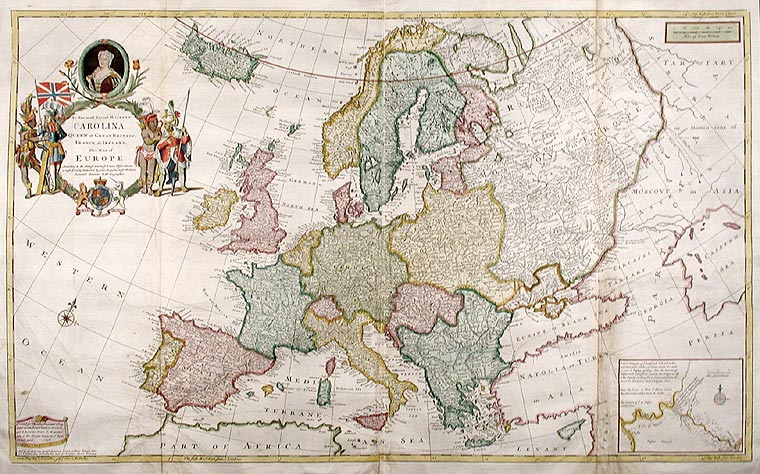
After the Peace of Westphalia in 1648, borders between European states were largely stable (1708 map by Herman Moll).

At the beginning of the 18th century, Europe had not yet dominated in the world economy because its military did not match that of Asian or Middle Eastern empires. However, through organizing its economics and improving technology in industry, European countries took the lead as the most powerful states in the late 18th century and remained in this position until late in the 20th century.

In the 18th century, Asia was making and distributing goods that were valued by other areas, namely coffee, cotton, silk, and tea. Europe on the other hand, was not producing products of interest to the other parts of the world. America's crops were not initially appealing to Europeans. Tobacco's demand had to be advertised, and eventually Europe became interested in this particular plant. In time, there was rather regular trans-Atlantic trade between the Americas and Western Europe for such crops as tobacco, cotton, and also goods available in South America.

At the beginning of the 19th century, Europe still dominated as the core region of the world. The First French Empire attempted to obtain hegemony over much of continental Europe under the rule of Napoleon Bonaparte. It lasted from 18 May 1804 to 4 April 1814 and again briefly from 20 March 1815 to 7 July 1815, when Napoleon was exiled to St. Helena. The United Kingdom of Great Britain and Ireland, with its naval, maritime, commercial, and financial dominance, was committed to the European balance of power after 1815.

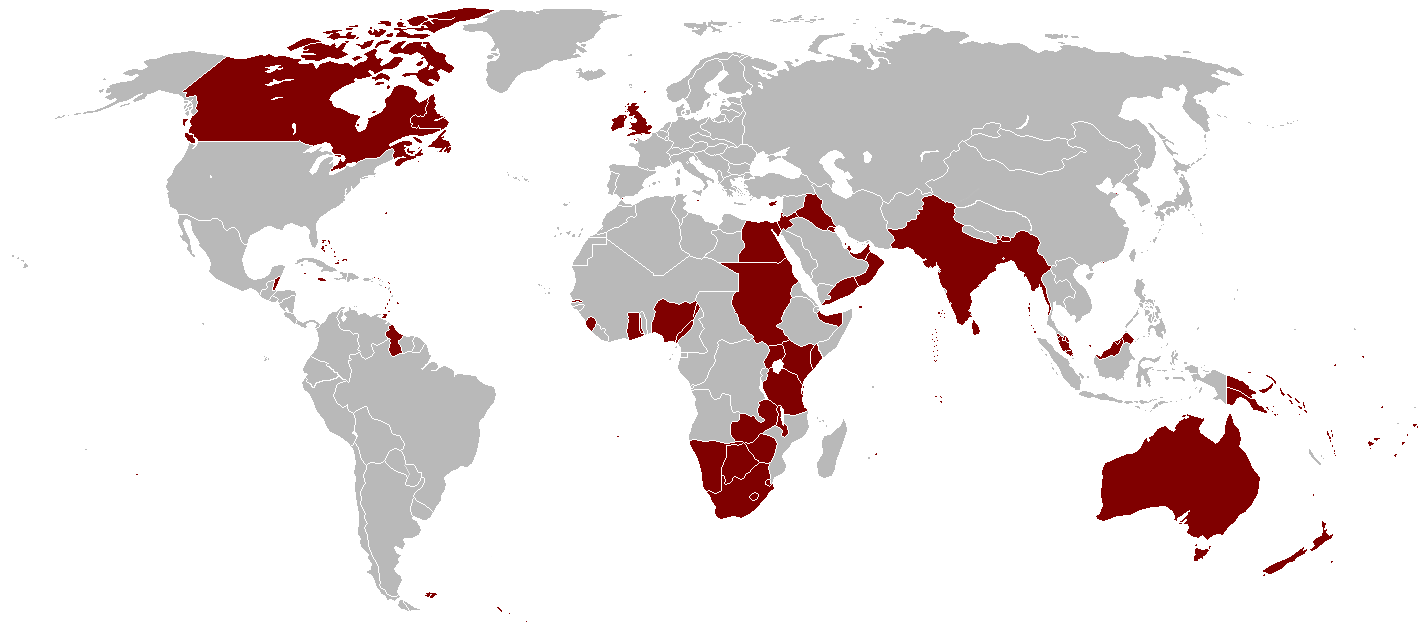
Map of the British Empire and its territories in 1921

Between the 1830s and 1850, France and the United Kingdom were the strongest powers in Europe, but by the 1850s they had become deeply concerned by the growing power of Imperial Russia, which had expanded westward towards Central Europe, and the Kingdom of Prussia, which was increasingly assuming greater control and influence over the German lands, aside from Austria. The Crimean War of 1853–1856 and the Italian War of 1859 shattered the relations among the Great Powers in Europe. The creation in 1871 and rise of the Prussian-led German Empire (excluding Austria) as a dominant nation (Prussia had quickly defeated both Austria and France in the Revolutionary and Napoleonic Wars) restructured the European balance of power. For the next twenty years, Otto von Bismarck managed to maintain the balance of power, by proposing treaties and creating many complex alliances between the European nations, such as the Triple Alliance.

In 1871, the German Empire was united and established itself as the leading industrial state on the European mainland. Its desire to dominate the mainland helped them to become a core state. After the First World War, economic and political turmoil in post-war European states continued to rage on, and Eastern Europe struggled to recover from the devastation of the war and the destabilising effects of not just the collapse of the Russian Empire due to the Bolshevik Revolution (1917), but the downfall of the Central Powers and their territorial destruction: the German, Austro-Hungarian, and Ottoman empires were defeated by the Allies in 1918, which led to the emergence of new core states during the Interwar period. This culminated with the Second World War, when the United Kingdom was forced to sacrifice its hegemony, allowing the United States and the Soviet Union to become world superpowers and major cores in 1945. The Soviet Union lost its core status following its collapse in 1991.

=== List of current core countries ===
The following are core according to Chase-Dunn, Kawano, Brewer (2000).

Australia	Austria	Belgium	Canada	Denmark
Finland	France	Germany	Greece	Hong Kong
Iceland	Ireland	Italy	Japan	Luxembourg
Macau	Netherlands	Norway	Portugal	Singapore
Spain	Sweden	Switzerland	United Kingdom	United States

Below is the core listing according to Babones (2005), who notes that this list is composed of countries that "have been consistently classified into a single one of the three zones [core, semi-periphery or periphery] of the world economy over the entire 28-year study period".

Australia	Austria	Belgium	Canada	Denmark
Finland	France	Germany	Greece	Hong Kong
Iceland	Ireland	Israel	Italy	Japan
Luxembourg	Netherlands	New Zealand	Norway	Singapore
Spain	Sweden	Switzerland	United Kingdom	United States

== Sociological theory ==
Developed countries are shown in blue (according to the International Monetary Fund, as of 2008).

The world-systems theory argues that a state's future is decided by their stance in the global economy. A global capitalistic market demands the needs for core (wealthy) countries and semi-peripheral or peripheral (poor) countries. Core states benefit from the hierarchical structure of international trade and labor. World-systems theory follows the logic that international wars or multinational financial disputes can be explained as attempts to change a location within the global market for a specific state or groups of states; these changes can have the objective to gain more control over the global market (to become a core country), while causing another state to lose control over the world market. As the two groups grew apart in power, world systems theorists to established another group, the semi-periphery, to act as the middle group.

Semi-periphery countries usually surround the core countries both in a physical and fundamental sense. The semi-periphery countries act as the middle men between the core and the periphery countries—by giving the wealthy countries what they receive from the poor countries. The periphery countries are the poorer countries usually specializing in farming and have access natural resources—which the core countries use to profit from.

== Key qualifiers ==
In order for a country to remain a core or to become a core, possible investors must be kept in mind when state's policies are planned. Core countries change with time due to many different factors including changes in geographic favoritism and regional affluence. Alterations in financing plans by companies will also play a part as they change to react to the continuously evolving world market.

In order for a country to be considered a core country nominee, the country must possess an independent, stable government and potential for growth in the global market and advances in technology. Although these three factors will not completely decide where a company chooses to invest—they do play extremely large roles in such decisions. A main key to becoming or remaining a core is determined by the country's government policies to encourage funding from outside.

== Main functions ==
The main function of the core countries is to command and financially benefit from the world system better than the rest of the world. Core countries could also be viewed as the capitalist class while the periphery countries could be viewed as a disordered working class. In a capitalism-driven market, core countries exchange goods with the poor states at an unequal rate greatly in favor of the core countries.

The periphery countries' purpose is to provide agricultural and natural resources along with the lower division of labor for larger corporations of semi-periphery and core countries. As a result of the lower priced division of labor and natural resources available, the core state's companies buy these products for a relatively low cost and then sell them for much higher. The periphery countries only receive low amounts of money for what they sell and must pay higher prices for anything they buy from outside their own region. Because of this continuous order, periphery countries can never earn enough to cover the costs of their imports while setting aside money to invest in better technologies. Core countries support this pattern by giving loans to the poor regions for specific investments in a raw material or type of agriculture, rather than help such regions establish themselves and balance out the world market.

== Effects ==
A disadvantage to core states is that to remain a member of the core grouping, the government must retain or create new policies that encourage investments to keep in their country and not relocate. This can make it difficult for governments to change regulatory standards that may sacrifice high profits.

== See also ==
- Agrowth
- American exceptionalism
- Civilizing mission
- Climate justice
- Core cities
- Core-periphery
  - First World
  - Second World
  - Third World
  - Fourth World
- Critique of political economy
- Debt-to-GDP ratio
- Degrowth
- Development theory
- Export-oriented industrialization
- International development
  - Developed country
  - Developing country
  - Least developed countries
- Land reform
- List of countries by wealth per adult
- Non-Aligned Movement (NAM)
- North–South model
  - Global North and Global South
- Prosperity Without Growth
- Status quo
- Sufficiency economy
- Sustainability
- Sustainable development
- Thermoeconomics
- Theories of imperialism
  - Dependency theory
  - Neocolonialism
  - Three Worlds Theory
- Uneconomic growth
- Unified growth theory
- Universal basic income
- Wealth redistribution
- The White Man's Burden
- Women migrant workers from developing countries
- World view
