= World-systems theory =

Approach emphasizing the world-system as the primary unit of social analysis

A world map of countries by their supposed trading status in 2000, using the world system differentiation into core countries (blue), semi-periphery countries (yellow) and periphery countries (red). Based on the list in Chase-Dunn, Kawana, and Brewer (2000).

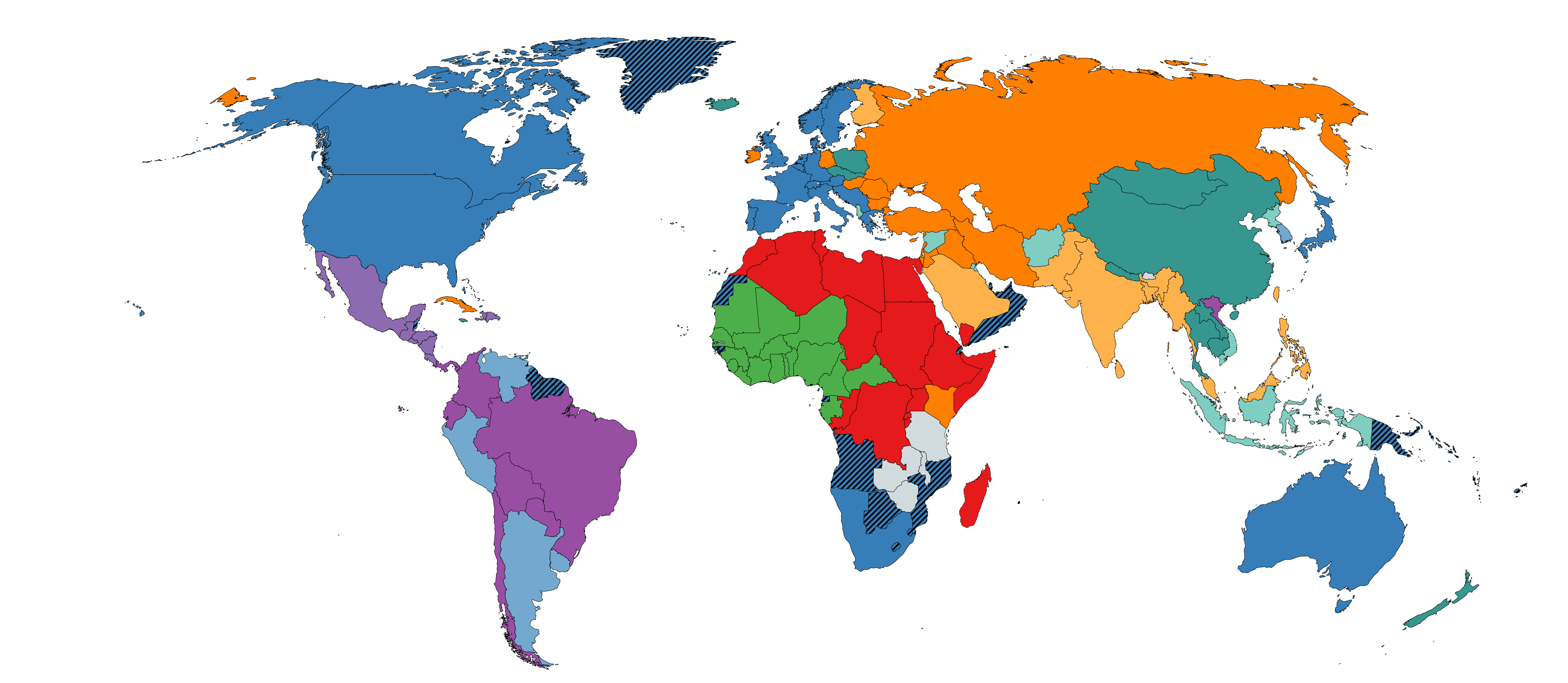
A world map of countries in 1965 colour-coded into 'blocks' based on trade, military interventions, diplomats and treaties: Block A Block B Block C & with dashed lines indicates colonies of Block C countries Block C' Block D Block D' Block E Block E' Block F Block F'

World-systems theory (also known as world-systems analysis or the world-systems perspective) is a multidisciplinary approach to world history and social change which emphasizes the world-system (and not nation states) as the primary (but not exclusive) unit of social analysis. World-systems theorists argue that their theory explains the rise and fall of states, income inequality, social unrest, and imperialism.

The "world-system" refers to the inter-regional and transnational division of labor, which divides the world into core countries, semi-periphery countries, and periphery countries. Core countries have higher-skill, capital-intensive industries, and the rest of the world has low-skill, labor-intensive industries and extraction of raw materials. This constantly reinforces the dominance of the core countries. This structure is unified by the division of labour. It is a world-economy rooted in a capitalist economy. For a time, certain countries have become the world hegemon; during the last few centuries, as the world-system has extended geographically and intensified economically, this status has passed from the Netherlands, to the United Kingdom and (most recently) to the United States.

Immanuel Wallerstein is the main proponent of world systems theory. Components of the world-systems analysis are longue durée by Fernand Braudel, "development of underdevelopment" by Andre Gunder Frank, and the single-society assumption. Longue durée is the concept of the gradual change through the day-to-day activities by which social systems are continually reproduced. "Development of underdevelopment" describes the economic processes in the periphery as the opposite of the development in the core. Poorer countries are impoverished to enable a few countries to get richer. Lastly, the single-society assumption opposes the multiple-society assumption and includes looking at the world as a whole.

== Background ==
Immanuel Wallerstein has developed the best-known version of world-systems analysis, beginning in the 1970s. Wallerstein traces the rise of the capitalist world-economy from the "long" 16th century (c. 1450–1640). The rise of capitalism, in his view, was an accidental outcome of the protracted crisis of feudalism (c. 1290–1450). Europe (the West) used its advantages and gained control over most of the world economy and presided over the development and spread of industrialization and capitalist economy, indirectly resulting in unequal development.

Though other commentators refer to Wallerstein's project as world-systems "theory," he consistently rejects that term. For Wallerstein, world-systems analysis is a mode of analysis that aims to transcend the structures of knowledge inherited from the 19th century, especially the definition of capitalism, the divisions within the social sciences, and those between the social sciences and history. For Wallerstein, then, world-systems analysis is a "knowledge movement" that seeks to discern the "totality of what has been paraded under the labels of the... human sciences and indeed well beyond". "We must invent a new language," Wallerstein insists, to transcend the illusions of the "three supposedly distinctive arenas" of society, economy and politics. The trinitarian structure of knowledge is grounded in another, even grander, modernist architecture, the distinction of biophysical worlds (including those within bodies) from social ones: "One question, therefore, is whether we will be able to justify something called social science in the twenty-first century as a separate sphere of knowledge." Many other scholars have contributed significant work in this "knowledge movement."

== Origins ==
=== Influences ===
World-systems theory emerged in the 1970s. Its roots can be found in sociology, but it has developed into a highly interdisciplinary field. World-systems theory was aiming to replace modernization theory, which Wallerstein criticised for three reasons:

1. its focus on the nation state as the only unit of analysis
2. its assumption that there is only a single path of evolutionary development for all countries
3. its disregard of transnational structures that constrain local and national development.

There are three major predecessors of world-systems theory: the Annales school, the Marxist tradition, and dependency theory. The Annales School tradition, represented most notably by Fernand Braudel, influenced Wallerstein to focus on long-term processes and geo-ecological regions as units of analysis. Marxism added a stress on social conflict, a focus on the capital accumulation process and competitive class struggles, a focus on a relevant totality, the transitory nature of social forms and a dialectical sense of motion through conflict and contradiction.

World-systems theory was also significantly influenced by dependency theory, a neo-Marxist explanation of development processes.

Other influences on the world-systems theory come from scholars such as Karl Polanyi, Nikolai Kondratiev and Joseph Schumpeter. These scholars researched business cycles and developed concepts of three basic modes of economic organization: reciprocal, redistributive, and market modes. Wallerstein reframed these concepts into a discussion of mini systems, world empires, and world economies.

Wallerstein sees the development of the capitalist world economy as detrimental to a large proportion of the world's population. Wallerstein views the period since the 1970s as an "age of transition" that will give way to a future world system (or world systems) whose configuration cannot be determined in advance.

Other world-systems thinkers include Oliver Cox, Samir Amin, Giovanni Arrighi, and Andre Gunder Frank, with major contributions by Christopher Chase-Dunn, Beverly Silver, Janet Abu Lughod, Li Minqi, Kunibert Raffer, and others. In sociology, a primary alternative perspective is World Polity Theory, as formulated by John W. Meyer.

=== Dependency theory ===
World-systems analysis builds upon but also differs fundamentally from dependency theory. While accepting world inequality, the world market and imperialism as fundamental features of historical capitalism, Wallerstein broke with orthodox dependency theory's central proposition. For Wallerstein, core countries do not exploit poor countries for two basic reasons.

Firstly, core capitalists exploit workers in all zones of the capitalist world economy (not just the periphery) and therefore, the crucial redistribution between core and periphery is surplus value, not "wealth" or "resources" abstractly conceived. Secondly, core states do not exploit poor states, as dependency theory proposes, because capitalism is organised around an inter-regional and transnational division of labor rather than an international division of labour. Thirdly, economically relevant structures such as metropolitan regions, international unions and bilateral agreements tend to weaken and blur out the economic importance of nation-states and their borders.

During the Industrial Revolution, for example, English capitalists exploited slaves (unfree workers) in the cotton zones of the American South, a peripheral region within a semiperipheral country, United States.

From a largely Weberian perspective, Fernando Henrique Cardoso described the main tenets of dependency theory as follows:

- There is a financial and technological penetration of the periphery and semi-periphery countries by the developed capitalist core countries.
- That produces an unbalanced economic structure within the peripheral societies and between them and the central countries.
- That leads to limitations upon self-sustained growth in the periphery.
- That helps the appearance of specific patterns of class relations.
- They require modifications in the role of the state to guarantee the functioning of the economy and the political articulation of a society, which contains, within itself, foci of inarticulateness and structural imbalance.

Dependency and world system theory propose that the poverty and backwardness of poor countries are caused by their peripheral position in the international division of labor. Since the capitalist world system evolved, the distinction between the central and the peripheral states has grown and diverged. In recognizing a tripartite pattern in the division of labor, world-systems analysis criticized dependency theory with its bimodal system of only cores and peripheries.

=== Immanuel Wallerstein ===
The best-known version of the world-systems approach was developed by Immanuel Wallerstein. Wallerstein notes that world-systems analysis calls for a unidisciplinary historical social science and contends that the modern disciplines, products of the 19th century, are deeply flawed because they are not separate logics, as is manifest for example in the de facto overlap of analysis among scholars of the disciplines. Wallerstein offers several definitions of a world-system, defining it in 1974 briefly:

a system is defined as a unit with a single division of labor and multiple cultural systems.

He also offered a longer definition:

...a social system, one that has boundaries, structures, member groups, rules of legitimation, and coherence. Its life is made up of the conflicting forces which hold it together by tension and tear it apart as each group seeks eternally to remold it to its advantage. It has the characteristics of an organism, in that it has a life-span over which its characteristics change in some respects and remain stable in others. One can define its structures as being at different times strong or weak in terms of the internal logic of its functioning.

In 1987, Wallerstein again defined it:

... not the system of the world, but a system that is a world and which can be, most often has been, located in an area less than the entire globe. World-systems analysis argues that the units of social reality within which we operate, whose rules constrain us, are for the most part such world-systems (other than the now extinct, small minisystems that once existed on the earth). World-systems analysis argues that there have been thus far only two varieties of world-systems: world-economies and world empires. A world-empire (examples, the Roman Empire, Han China) are large bureaucratic structures with a single political center and an axial division of labor, but multiple cultures. A world-economy is a large axial division of labor with multiple political centers and multiple cultures. In English, the hyphen is essential to indicate these concepts. "World system" without a hyphen suggests that there has been only one world-system in the history of the world.

—

Wallerstein characterizes the world system as a set of mechanisms, which redistributes surplus value from the periphery to the core. In his terminology, the core is the developed, industrialized part of the world, and the periphery is the "underdeveloped", typically raw materials-exporting, poor part of the world; the market being the means by which the core exploits the periphery.

Apart from them, Wallerstein defines four temporal features of the world system. Cyclical rhythms represent the short-term fluctuation of economy, and secular trends mean deeper long run tendencies, such as general economic growth or decline. The term contradiction means a general controversy in the system, usually concerning some short term versus long term tradeoffs. For example, the problem of underconsumption, wherein the driving down of wages increases the profit for capitalists in the short term, but in the long term, the decreasing of wages may have a crucially harmful effect by reducing the demand for the product. The last temporal feature is the crisis: a crisis occurs if a constellation of circumstances brings about the end of the system.

In Wallerstein's view, there have been three kinds of historical systems across human history: "mini-systems" or what anthropologists call bands, tribes, and small chiefdoms, and two types of world-systems, one that is politically unified and the other is not (single state world empires and multi-polity world economies). World-systems are larger, and are ethnically diverse. The modern world-system, a capitalist world-economy, is unique in being the first and only world-system, which emerged around 1450 to 1550, to have geographically expanded across the entire planet, by about 1900. It is defined, as a world-economy, in having many political units tied together as an interstate system and through its division of labor based on capitalist enterprises.

== Importance ==
World-Systems Theory can be useful in understanding world history and the core countries' motives for imperialization and other involvements like the US aid following natural disasters in developing Central American countries or imposing regimes on other core states. With the interstate system as a system constant, the relative economic power of the three tiers points to the internal inequalities that are on the rise in states that appear to be developing. Some argue that this theory, though, ignores local efforts of innovation that have nothing to do with the global economy, such as the labor patterns implemented in Caribbean sugar plantations. Other modern global topics can be easily traced back to the world-systems theory.

As global talk about climate change and the future of industrial corporations, the world systems theory can help to explain the creation of the G-77 group, a coalition of 77 peripheral and semi-peripheral states wanting a seat at the global climate discussion table. The group was formed in 1964, but it now has more than 130 members who advocate for multilateral decision making. Since its creation, G-77 members have collaborated with two main aims: 1) decreasing their vulnerability based on the relative size of economic influence, and 2) improving outcomes for national development. World-systems theory has also been utilized to trace CO_{2} emissions’ damage to the ozone layer. The levels of world economic entrance and involvement can affect the damage a country does to the earth. In general, scientists can make assumptions about a country's CO_{2} emissions based on GDP. Higher exporting countries, countries with debt, and countries with social structure turmoil land in the upper-periphery tier. Though more research must be done in the arena, scientists can call core, semi-periphery, and periphery labels as indicators for CO_{2} intensity.

In a health realm, studies have shown the effect of less industrialized countries’, the periphery's, acceptance of packaged foods and beverages that are loaded with sugars and preservatives. While core states benefit from dumping large amounts of processed, fatty foods into poorer states, there has been a recorded increase in obesity and related chronic conditions such as diabetes and chronic heart disease. While some aspects of the modernization theory have been found to improve the global obesity crisis, a world systems theory approach identifies holes in the progress.

Knowledge economy and finance now dominate the industry in core states while manufacturing has shifted to semi-periphery and periphery ones. Technology has become a defining factor in the placement of states into core or semi-periphery versus periphery. Wallerstein's theory leaves room for poor countries to move into better economic development, but he also admits that there will always be a need for periphery countries as long as there are core states who derive resources from them. As a final mark of modernity, Wallerstein admits that advocates are the heart of this world-system: “Exploitation and the refusal to accept exploitation as either inevitable or just constitute the continuing antinomy of the modern era”.

== Influence on International Law ==
Third World Approaches to International Law (TWAIL), influenced by world-systems theory, critique the traditional view of international law (IL) as a horizontal system of equal sovereign states. This orthodox perspective, rooted in legal positivism, is challenged by the argument that global capitalism functions as a de facto sovereign power, shaping and enforcing international law in a hierarchical, top-down manner.

Scholars like Antony Anghie have examined the historical role of international law in advancing colonial agendas, aligning this analysis with the Marxian concept of primitive accumulation. This concept situates colonialism within the broader framework of capital accumulation, demonstrating how IL has historically facilitated the exploitation and subordination of non-European states. From this perspective, international law is not a neutral framework of horizontal equality but a tool that mirrors and perpetuates the dominance of global capital. By doing so, it enforces a vertical hierarchy of power, subordinating states and communities to the interests of dominant economic and political forces.

== Characteristics ==
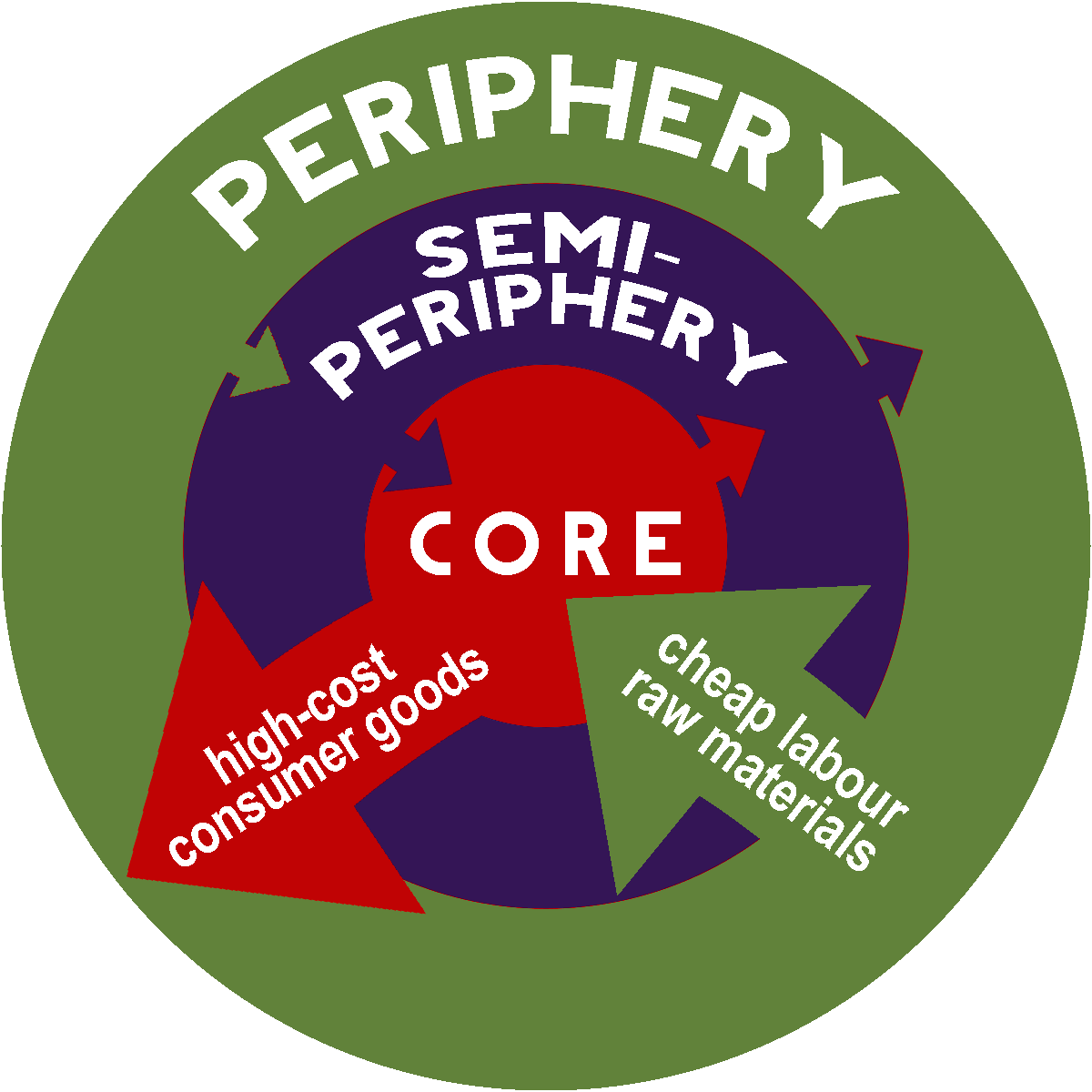
A model of a core-periphery system like that used in world-systems theory

World-systems analysis argues that capitalism, as a historical system, has always integrated a variety of labor forms within a functioning division of labor (world economy). Countries do not have economies but are part of the world economy. Far from being separate societies or worlds, the world economy manifests a tripartite division of labor, with core, semiperipheral and peripheral zones. In the core zones, businesses, with the support of states they operate within, monopolise the most profitable activities of the division of labor.

There are many ways to attribute a specific country to the core, semi-periphery, or periphery. Using an empirically based sharp formal definition of "domination" in a two-country relationship, Piana in 2004 defined the "core" as made up of "free countries" dominating others without being dominated, the "semi-periphery" as the countries that are dominated (usually, but not necessarily, by core countries) but at the same time dominating others (usually in the periphery) and "periphery" as the countries dominated. Based on 1998 data, the full list of countries in the three regions, together with a discussion of methodology, can be found.

The late 18th and early 19th centuries marked a great turning point in the development of capitalism in that capitalists achieved state society power in the key states, which furthered the industrial revolution marking the rise of capitalism. World-systems analysis contends that capitalism as a historical system formed earlier and that countries do not "develop" in stages, but the system does, and events have a different meaning as a phase in the development of historical capitalism, the emergence of the three ideologies of the national developmental mythology (the idea that countries can develop through stages if they pursue the right set of policies): conservatism, liberalism, and radicalism.

Classification of the countries according to the world-system analysis of I. Wallerstein: core, semi-periphery and periphery.

Proponents of world-systems analysis see the world stratification system the same way Karl Marx viewed class (ownership versus nonownership of the means of production) and Max Weber viewed class (which, in addition to ownership, stressed occupational skill level in the production process). The core states primarily own and control the major means of production in the world and perform the higher-level production tasks. The periphery nations own very little of the world's means of production (even when they are located in periphery states) and provide less-skilled labour. Like a class system within states, class positions in the world economy result in an unequal distribution of rewards or resources. The core states receive the greatest share of surplus production, and periphery states receive the smallest share. Furthermore, core states are usually able to purchase raw materials and other goods from non-core states at low prices and demand higher prices for their exports to non-core states. Chirot (1986) lists the five most important benefits coming to core states from their domination of the periphery:

1. Access to a large quantity of raw material
2. Cheap labour
3. Enormous profits from direct capital investments
4. A market for exports
5. Skilled professional labor through migration of these people from the non-core to the core.

According to Wallerstein, the unique qualities of the modern world system include its capitalistic nature, its truly global nature, and the fact that it is a world economy that has not become politically unified into a world empire.

=== Core states ===
In general, core states:

- Are the most economically diversified, wealthy, and powerful both economically and militarily
- Have strong central governments controlling extensive bureaucracies and powerful militaries
- Have stronger and more complex state institutions that help manage economic affairs internally and externally
- Have a sufficiently large tax base, such that state institutions can provide the infrastructure for a strong economy
- Are highly industrialised and produce manufactured goods for export instead of raw materials
- Increasingly tend to specialise in the information, finance, and service industries
- Are more regularly at the forefront of new technologies and new industries. Contemporary examples include the electronics and biotechnology industries. The use of the assembly line is a historic example of this trend.
- Have strong bourgeois and working classes
- Have significant means of influence over non-core states
- Are relatively independent of outside control

World Systems Theory (Dunaway and Clelland 2015)

Throughout the history of the modern world system, a group of core states has competed for access to the world's resources, economic dominance, and hegemony over periphery states. Occasionally, one core state possessed clear dominance over the others. According to Immanuel Wallerstein, a core state is dominant over all the others when it has a lead in three forms of economic dominance:

1. Productivity dominance allows a country to develop higher-quality products at a cheaper price compared to other countries.
2. Productivity dominance may lead to trade dominance. In this case, there is a favorable balance of trade for the dominant state since other countries are buying more of its products than those of others.
3. Trade dominance may lead to financial dominance. At this point, more money is flowing into the country than is leaving it. Bankers from the dominant state tend to acquire greater control over the world's financial resources.

Military dominance is also likely once a state has reached this point. However, it has been posited that throughout the modern world system, no state has been able to use its military to gain economic dominance. Each of the past dominant states became dominant with fairly small levels of military spending and began to lose economic dominance with military expansion later on. Historically, cores were located in northwestern Europe (England, France, Netherlands) but later appeared in other parts of the world such as the United States, Canada, and Australia.

=== Peripheral states ===
- Are the least economically diversified
- Have relatively weak governments
- Have relatively weak institutions, with tax bases too small to support infrastructural development
- Tend to depend on one type of economic activity, often by extracting and exporting raw materials to core states
- Tend to be the least industrialized
- Are often targets for investments from multinational (or transnational) corporations from core states that come into the country to exploit cheap unskilled labor in order to export back to core states
- Have a small bourgeois and a large peasant classes
- Tend to have populations with high percentages of poor and uneducated people
- Tend to have very high social inequality because of small upper classes that own most of the land and have profitable ties to multinational corporations
- Tend to be extensively influenced by core states and their multinational corporations and often forced to follow economic policies that help core states and harm the long-term economic prospects of peripheral states.

Historically, peripheries were found outside Europe, such as in Latin America and today in sub-Saharan Africa.

=== Semi-peripheral states ===
Semi-peripheral states are those that are midway between the core and periphery. Thus, they have to keep themselves from falling into the category of peripheral states and at the same time, they strive to join the category of core states. Therefore, they tend to apply protectionist policies most aggressively among the three categories of states. They tend to be countries moving towards industrialization and more diversified economies. These regions often have relatively developed and diversified economies but are not dominant in international trade. They tend to export more to peripheral states and import more from core states in trade. According to some scholars, such as Chirot, they are not as subject to outside manipulation as peripheral societies; but according to others (Barfield), they have "periperial-like" relations to the core. While in the sphere of influence of some cores, semiperipheries also tend to exert their own control over some peripheries. Further, semi-peripheries act as buffers between cores and peripheries and thus "...partially deflect the political pressures which groups primarily located in peripheral areas might otherwise direct against core-states" and stabilise the world system.

Semi-peripheries can come into existence from developing peripheries and declining cores. Historically, two examples of semiperipheral states would be Spain and Portugal, which fell from their early core positions but still managed to retain influence in Latin America. Those countries imported silver and gold from their American colonies but then had to use it to pay for manufactured goods from core countries such as England and France. In the 20th century, states like the "settler colonies" of Australia, Canada and New Zealand had a semiperipheral status. In the 21st century, states like Brazil, Russia, India, China, South Africa (BRICS), and Israel are usually considered semiperipheral.

=== Interstate system ===
Between the core, periphery and semi-periphery countries lies a system of interconnected state relationships, or the interstate system. The interstate system arose either as a concomitant process or as a consequence of the development of the capitalist world-system over the course of the “long” 16th century as states began to recognize each other's sovereignty and form agreements and rules between themselves.

Wallerstein wrote that there were no concrete rules about what exactly constitutes an individual state as various indicators of statehood (sovereignty, power, market control etc.) could range from total to nil. There were also no clear rules about which group controlled the state, as various groups located inside, outside, and across the states’ frontiers could seek to increase or decrease state power in order to better profit from a world-economy. Nonetheless, the “relative power continuum of stronger and weaker states has remained relatively unchanged over 400-odd years” implying that while there is no universal state system, an interstate system had developed out of the sum of state actions, which existed to reinforce certain rules and preconditions of statehood. These rules included maintaining consistent relations of production, and regulating the flow of capital, commodities and labor across borders to maintain the price structures of the global market. If weak states attempt to rewrite these rules as they prefer them, strong states will typically intervene to rectify the situation.

The ideology of the interstate system is sovereign equality, and while the system generally presents a set of constraints on the power of individual states, within the system states are “neither sovereign nor equal.” Not only do strong states impose their will on weak states, strong states also impose limitations upon other strong states, and tend to seek strengthened international rules, since enforcing consequences for broken rules can be highly beneficial and confer comparative advantages.

=== External areas ===
External areas are those that maintain socially necessary divisions of labor independent of the capitalist world economy.

== The interpretation of world history ==
The 13th century world-system

Wallerstein traces the origin of today's world-system to the "long 16th century" (a period that began with the discovery of the Americas by Western European sailors and ended with the English Revolution of 1640). And, according to Wallerstein, globalization, or the becoming of the world's system, is a process coterminous with the spread and development of capitalism over the past 500 years.

Janet Abu Lughod argues that a pre-modern world system extensive across Eurasia existed in the 13th century prior to the formation of the modern world-system identified by Wallerstein. She contends that the Mongol Empire played an important role in stitching together the Chinese, Indian, Muslim and European regions in the 13th century, before the rise of the modern world system. In debates, Wallerstein contends that Lughod's system was not a "world-system" because it did not entail integrated production networks, but it was instead a vast trading network.

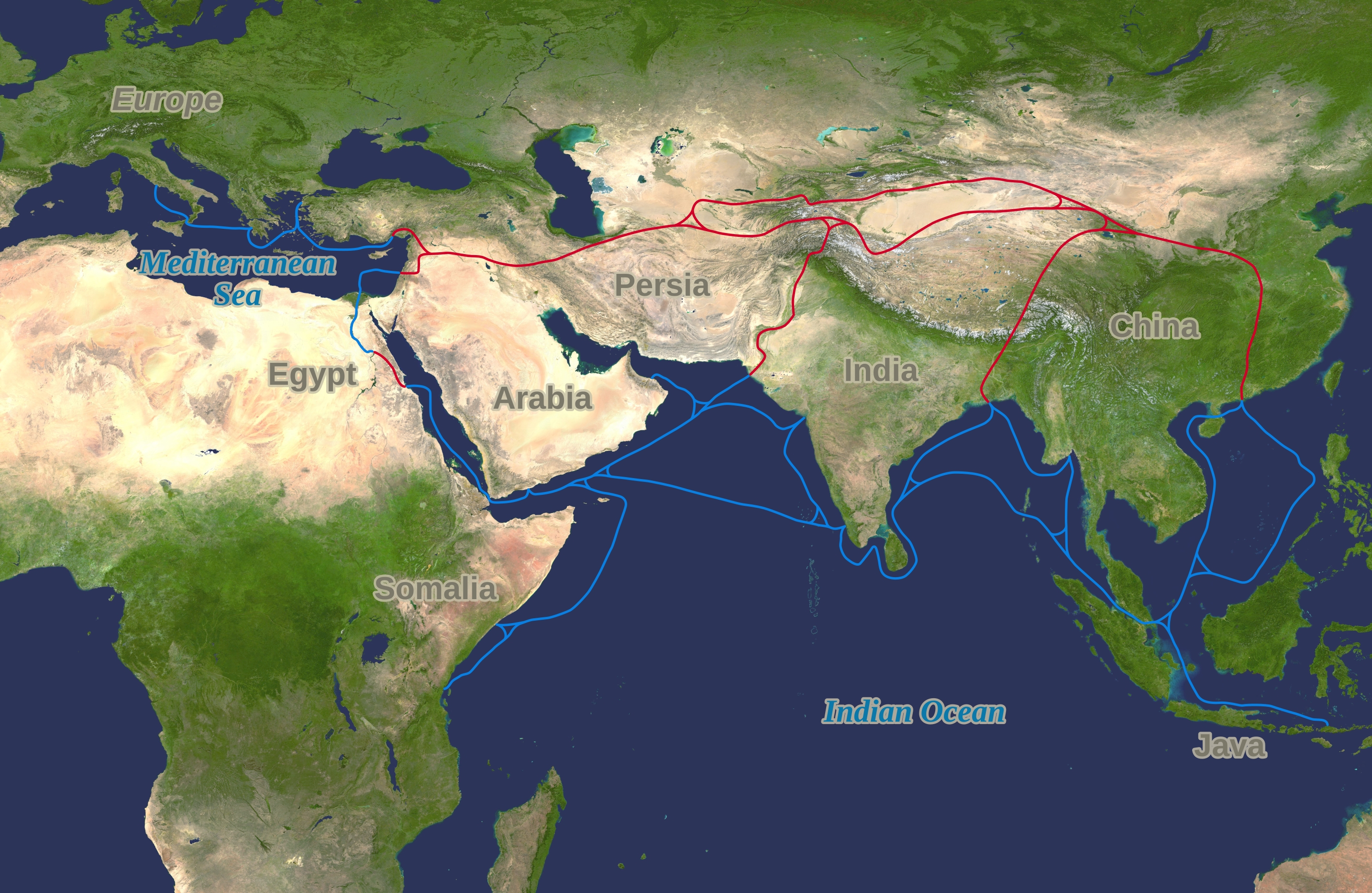
The 11th century world system

Andre Gunder Frank goes further and claims that a global world system that includes Asia, Europe and Africa has existed since the 4th millennium BCE. The centre of this system was in Asia, specifically China. Andrey Korotayev goes even further than Frank and dates the beginning of the world system formation to the 10th millennium BCE and connects it with the start of the Neolithic Revolution in the Middle East. According to him, the centre of this system was originally in Western Asia.

Before the 16th century, Europe was dominated by feudal economies. European economies grew from mid-12th to 14th century but from 14th to mid 15th century, they suffered from a major crisis. Wallerstein explains this crisis as caused by the following:

1. stagnation or even decline of agricultural production, increasing the burden of peasants,
2. decreased agricultural productivity caused by changing climatological conditions (Little Ice Age),
3. an increase in epidemics (Black Death),
4. optimum level of the feudal economy having been reached in its economic cycle; the economy moved beyond it and entered a depression period.

As a response to the failure of the feudal system, European society embraced the capitalist system. Europeans were motivated to develop technology to explore and trade around the world, using their superior military to take control of the trade routes. Europeans exploited their initial small advantages, which led to an accelerating process of accumulation of wealth and power in Europe.

Wallerstein notes that never before had an economic system encompassed that much of the world, with trade links crossing so many political boundaries. In the past, geographically large economic systems existed but were mostly limited to spheres of domination of large empires (such as the Roman Empire); development of capitalism enabled the world economy to extend beyond individual states. International division of labor was crucial in deciding what relationships exists between different regions, their labor conditions and political systems. For classification and comparison purposes, Wallerstein introduced the categories of core, semi-periphery, periphery, and external countries. Cores monopolized the capital-intensive production, and the rest of the world could provide only workforce and raw resources. The resulting inequality reinforced existing unequal development.

According to Wallerstein there have only been three periods in which a core state dominated in the modern world-system, with each lasting less than one hundred years. In the initial centuries of the rise of European dominance, Northwestern Europe constituted the core, Mediterranean Europe the semiperiphery, and Eastern Europe and the Western hemisphere (and parts of Asia) the periphery. Around 1450, Spain and Portugal took the early lead when conditions became right for a capitalist world-economy. They led the way in establishing overseas colonies. However, Portugal and Spain lost their lead, primarily by becoming overextended with empire-building. It became too expensive to dominate and protect so many colonial territories around the world.

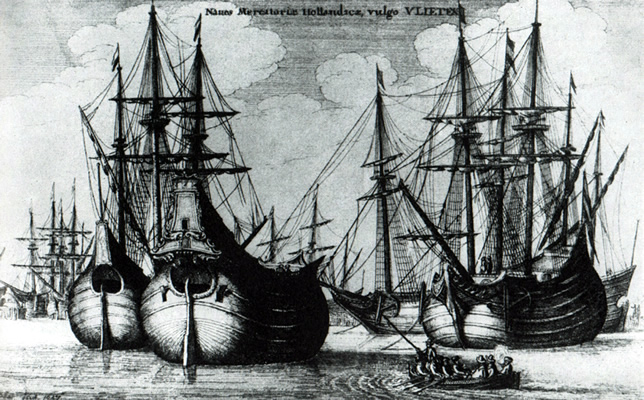
Dutch fluyts of the seventeenth century

The first state to gain clear dominance was the Netherlands in the 17th century, after its revolution led to a new financial system that many historians consider revolutionary. An impressive shipbuilding industry also contributed to their economic dominance through more exports to other countries. Eventually, other countries began to copy the financial methods and efficient production created by the Dutch. After the Dutch gained their dominant status, the standard of living rose, pushing up production costs.

Dutch bankers began to go outside of the country seeking profitable investments, and the flow of capital moved, especially to England. By the end of the 17th century, conflict among core states increased as a result of the economic decline of the Dutch. Anglo-Dutch commercial and financial relationships helped England gain productivity and trade dominance, and Dutch military support helped England to defeat France, the other country competing for dominance at the time.

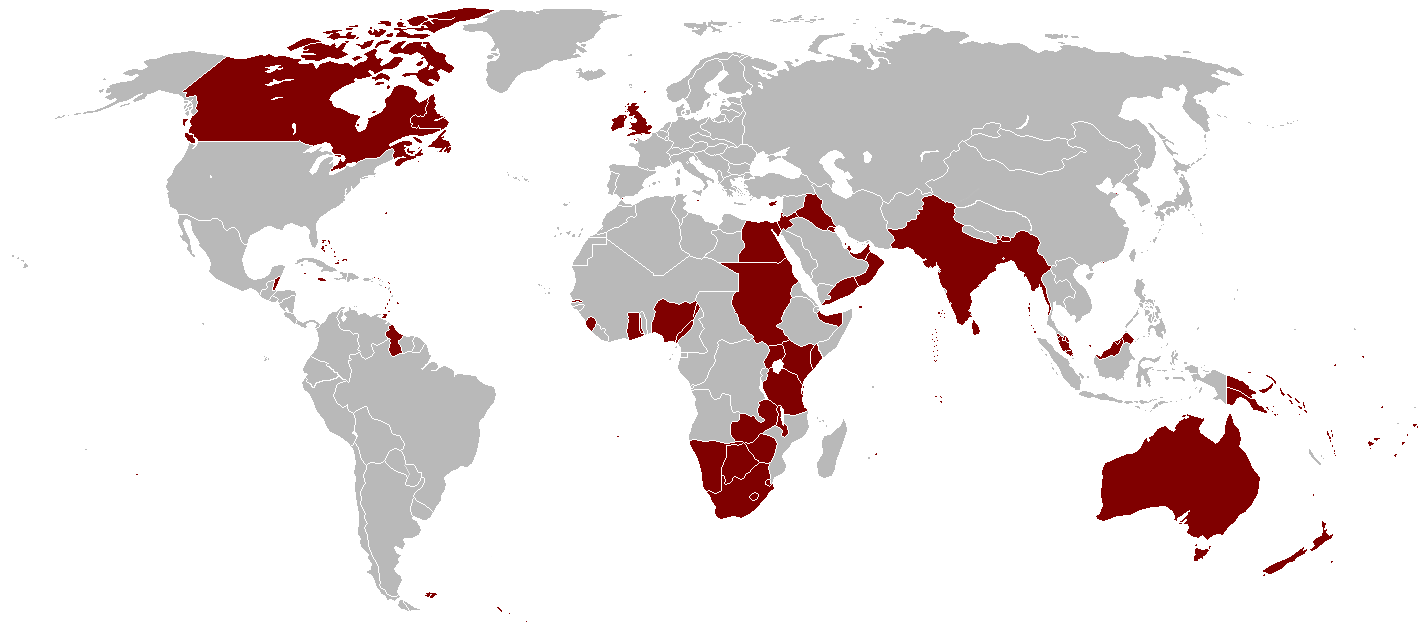
Map showing the British Empire in 1921

In the 19th century, Britain replaced the Netherlands as the hegemon. As a result of the new British dominance, the world system became relatively stable again during the 19th century. The British began to expand globally, with many colonies in the New World, Africa, and Asia. The colonial system began to place a strain on the British military and, along with other factors, led to an economic decline. Again there was a great deal of core conflict after the British lost their clear dominance. This time it was Germany, and later Italy and Japan that provided the new threat.

Industrialization was another ongoing process during British dominance, resulting in the diminishing importance of the agricultural sector. In the 18th century, Britain was Europe's leading industrial and agricultural producer; by 1900, only 10% of England's population was working in the agricultural sector.

By 1900, the modern world system appeared very different from that of a century earlier in that most of the periphery societies had already been colonised by one of the older core states. In 1800, the old European core claimed 35% of the world's territory, but by 1914, it claimed 85% of the world's territory, with the Scramble for Africa closing out the imperial era. If a core state wanted periphery areas to exploit as had done the Dutch and British, these periphery areas had to be taken from another core state, which the US did by way of the Spanish–American War, and Germany, and then Japan and Italy, attempted to do in the leadup to World War II. The modern world system was thus geographically global, and even the most remote regions of the world had all been integrated into the global economy.

As countries vied for core status, so did the United States. The American Civil War led to more power for the Northern industrial elites, who were now better able to pressure the government for policies helping industrial expansion. Like the Dutch bankers, British bankers were putting more investment toward the United States. The US had a small military budget compared to other industrial states at the time.

The US began to take the place of the British as a new dominant state after World War I. With Japan and Europe in ruins after World War II, the US was able to dominate the modern world system more than any other country in history, while the USSR and to a lesser extent China were viewed as primary threats. At its height, US economic reach accounted for over half of the world's industrial production, owned two thirds of the gold reserves in the world and supplied one third of the world's exports.

However, since the end of the Cold War, the future of US hegemony has been questioned by some scholars, as its hegemonic position has been in decline for a few decades. By the end of the 20th century, the core of the wealthy industrialized countries was composed of Western Europe, the United States, Japan and a rather limited selection of other countries. The semiperiphery was typically composed of independent states that had not achieved Western levels of influence, while poor former colonies of the West formed most of the periphery.

== Criticisms ==
World-systems theory has attracted criticisms from its rivals; notably for being too focused on economy and not enough on culture and for being too core-centric and state-centric. William I. Robinson has criticized world-systems theory for its nation-state centrism, state-structuralist approach, and its inability to conceptualize the rise of globalization. Robinson suggests that world-systems theory does not account for emerging transnational social forces and the relationships forged between them and global institutions serving their interests. These forces operate on a global, rather than state system and cannot be understood by Wallerstein's nation-centered approach.

According to Wallerstein himself, critique of the world-systems approach comes from four directions: the positivists, the orthodox Marxists, the state autonomists, and the culturalists. The positivists criticise the approach as too prone to generalization, lacking quantitative data and failing to put forth a falsifiable proposition. Orthodox Marxists find the world-systems approach deviating too far from orthodox Marxist principles, such as by not giving enough weight to the concept of social class. It is worth noting, however, that "[d]ependency theorists argued that [the beneficiaries of class society, the bourgeoisie,] maintained a dependent relationship because their private interests coincided with the interest of the dominant states." The state autonomists criticize the theory for blurring the boundaries between state and businesses. Further, the positivists and the state autonomists argue that state should be the central unit of analysis. Finally, the culturalists argue that world-systems theory puts too much importance on the economy and not enough on the culture. In Wallerstein's own words:

In short, most of the criticisms of world-systems analysis criticize it for what it explicitly proclaims as its perspective. World-systems analysis views these other modes of analysis as defective and/or limiting in scope and calls for unthinking them.

One of the fundamental conceptual problems of the world-system theory is that the assumptions that define its actual conceptual units are social systems. The assumptions, which define them, need to be examined as well as how they are related to each other and how one changes into another. The essential argument of the world-system theory is that in the 16th century a capitalist world economy developed, which could be described as a world system. The following is a theoretical critique concerned with the basic claims of world-system theory: "There are today no socialist systems in the world-economy any more than there are feudal systems because there is only one world system. It is a world-economy and it is by definition capitalist in form."

Robert Brenner has pointed out that the prioritization of the world market means the neglect of local class structures and class struggles: "They fail to take into account either the way in which these class structures themselves emerge as the outcome of class struggles whose results are incomprehensible in terms merely of market forces." Another criticism is that of reductionism made by Theda Skocpol: she believes the interstate system is far from being a simple superstructure of the capitalist world economy: "The international states system as a transnational structure of military competition was not originally created by capitalism. Throughout modern world history, it represents an analytically autonomous level [... of] world capitalism, but [is] not reducible to it."

A concept that we can perceive as critique and mostly as renewal is the concept of coloniality (Anibal Quijano, 2000, Nepantla, Coloniality of power, eurocentrism and Latin America). Issued from the think tank of the group "modernity/coloniality" in Latin America, it re-uses the concept of world working division and core/periphery system in its system of coloniality. But criticizing the "core-centric" origin of World-system and its only economical development, "coloniality" allows further conception of how power still processes in a colonial way over worldwide populations (Ramon Grosfogel, "the epistemic decolonial turn" 2007): "by 'colonial situations' I mean the cultural, political, sexual, spiritual, epistemic and economic oppression/exploitation of subordinate racialized/ethnic groups by dominant racialized/ethnic groups with or without the existence of colonial administration". Coloniality covers, so far, several fields such as coloniality of gender (Maria Lugones), coloniality of "being" (Maldonado Torres), coloniality of knowledge (Walter Mignolo) and Coloniality of power (Anibal Quijano).

== Related journals ==
- Annales. Histoire, Sciences sociales
- Ecology and Society
- Journal of World-Systems Research

== See also ==
- Big History
- Dependency theory
- Structuralist economics
- Third Space Theory
- Third place
- Hybridity
- Post-colonial theory
- General systems theory
- Geography and cartography in medieval Islam
- Globalization
- International relations theory
- List of cycles
- Social cycle theory
- Sociocybernetics
- Systems philosophy
- Systems thinking
- Systemography
- War cycles
- Hierarchy theory
- Uneven and combined development
