= Attila Chikán =

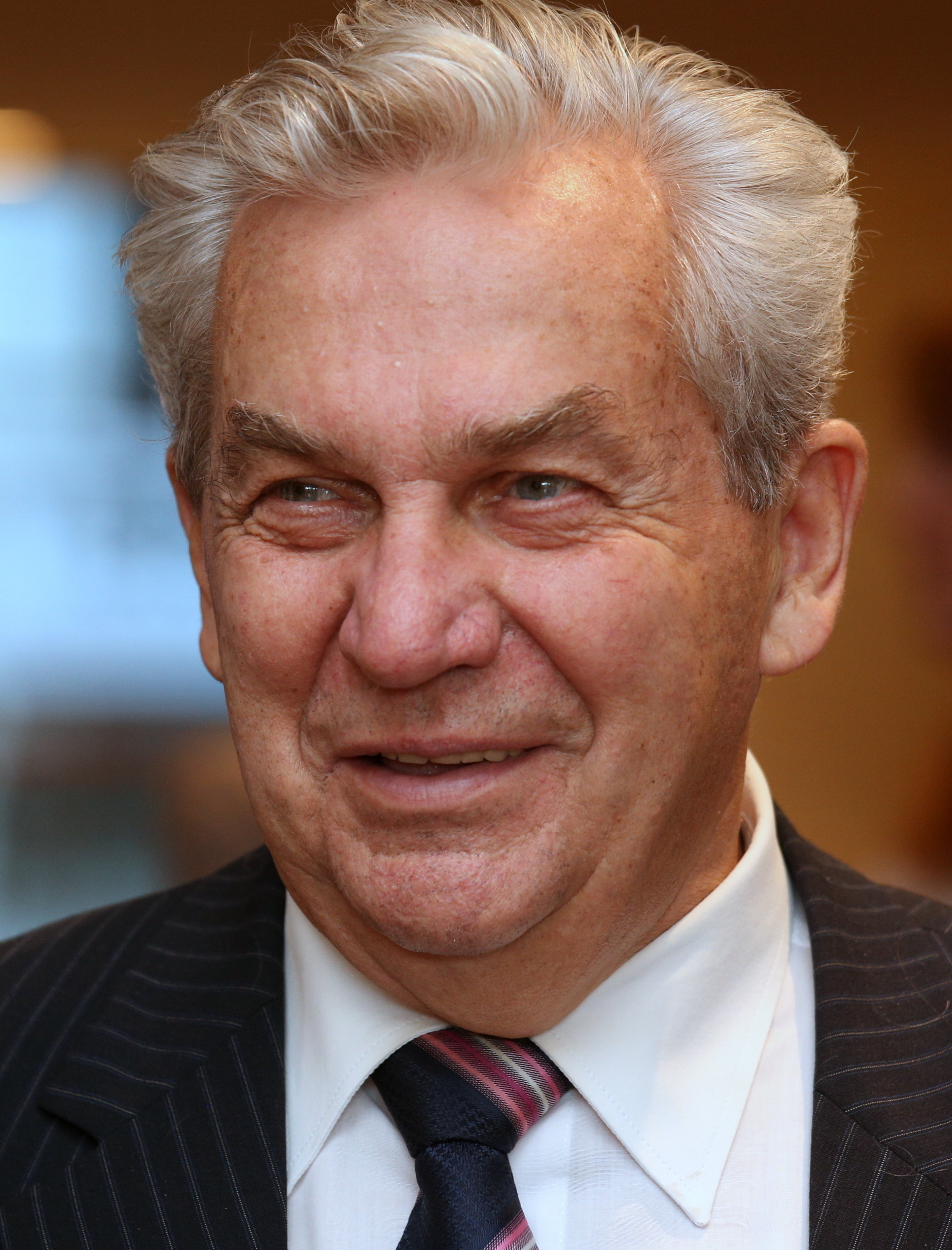

Minister of Economy of Hungary
- In office 8 July 1998 – 31 December 1999
- Preceded by: position established
- Succeeded by: György Matolcsy

Personal details
- Born: 4 April 1944 (age 82) Budapest, Hungary
- Party: Independent
- Spouse: Márta Nagy
- Children: Attila; Eszter
- Profession: politician, economist

Attila Chikán (born 4 April 1944, in Budapest) is a Hungarian economist, university professor, Full Member of the Hungarian Academy of Sciences and Foreign Member of the Royal Swedish Academy of Engineering Sciences. His research areas are national and firm competitiveness, business policy, and logistics. He is Founding Principal of Rajk László College for Advanced Studies (Director 1970–2010, President since then). Minister of Economic Affairs in 1998–99, Rector of Corvinus University of Budapest (CUB, 2000–2003). Currently he is Professor Emeritus and Director, Competitiveness Research Center of CUB.

== Career ==
He graduated in Mathematical Planning at the predecessor of Corvinus University of Budapest (CUB; at that time Karl Marx University of Economic Sciences) in 1967. Worked at the Engineering Office of Ministry of Metallurgy and Machinery in 1967–1968, then became Assistant Professor at Karl Marx University where he defended his doctoral dissertation in 1969. Full professor of this same university since 1990. In 1970, he was Founding Director of Rajk László College for Advanced Studies, a unique higher education institution, where he was Director till 2010 and has been President since then. in 1989 he was founding Chairman of the Department of Business Economics of Karl Marx University (later CUB), and led it until 1998, when he became Minister of Economic Affairs in the first Orbán government. He was Rector of CUB between 2000 and 2003, and Chairman of the Council of Economic Advisors of the Prime Minister between 2000 and 2002. Since 2003, he has been Professor of Business Economics and Director of Competitiveness Research Centre at Institute of Business Economics of CUB. Since 2014, he is Professor Emeritus. He is a member of the Board of Central European University.

== International positions and honors ==
His past and present international positions include President, IFPSM (1999–2000), President, Federation of European Production and Industrial Management Societies (1995), Executive Vice President, International Society for Inventory Research (since 1983) and membership in various refereed international journals. He is Honorary Doctor of Lappeenranta University of Technology (Finland) and Babeș-Bolyai University (Cluj, Romania). He has a number of decorations for professional and public activity, including the Garner Themoin Award of the International Federation of Purchasing and Supply Management (IFPSM), the Life Time Achievement Award of the International Purchasing and Supply Education and Research Association (IPSERA) and The Middle Cross of the Order of Merits of the Hungarian Republic.

== Current positions in Hungary ==
Chairman of the Supervisory Board and the Audit Committee, Gedeon Richter plc (a multinational company in the pharmaceutical industry), Vice Chairman of the Supervisory Board and Chairman of the Audit Committee of MOL (the Hungarian Oil and Gas Company). He is Chairman of several professional organizations, including the Committee of Economic Policy and Theory, Hungarian Economic Association, Committee of Economic Policy of the Hungarian Association of Entrepreneurs and Employers and the Hungarian Association of Logistics Purchasing and Inventory Management.

His main research areas are national and firm competitiveness, business economics and logistics. He is author and co-author of 15 books in English and Hungarian, as well as over two dozens of papers in refereed international journals. His monograph "Business Economics" has had seven editions since 1989 (latest in 2017) and has been the reading of tens of thousands of students and professionals.

== Personal ==
His wife, Marta Nagy is retired Vice President of the National Competition Office, son, Attila CEO of an energy producing and trading company, daughter, Eszter is co-owner and Managing Director of a music management firm. Grandchildren: Anna, Bendegúz, Léna.

== Selected recent papers ==
Chikán A., Kiss-Dobronyi B., Homoki-Szabó E., Molnár B.: Government influence on national competitiveness (evidence from the COVID era)
COMPETITIVENESS REVIEW (2024) Article publication date: 19 December 2024 (2024)

Chikán A.: A Rajk Szakkollégium modellje: Értékek, elvek, módszerek
Budapest, Magyarország : Akadémiai Kiadó (2023)

Chikán A., Czakó E., Kiss-Dobronyi B., Losonci D.: Firm Competitiveness: a General Model and a Manufacturing Application
International Journal of Production Economics 243 Paper: 108316, 13 p. (2022)

Chikán A.: Vállalatgazdaságtan: hatodik, bővített kiadás
Budapest, Magyarország : Akadémiai Kiadó (2021)

Chikán A., Sprague L.G.: A life cycle model of major innovations in operations management
International Journal of Quality Innovation 5 : 1 p. 5 (2019)

Chikán A., Kovács E., Matyusz Zs., Sass M., Vakhal P.: Long-term trends in inventory investment in traditional market and post-socialist economies
International Journal of Production Economics 181: pp. 14–23. (2016)

Chikán A.: Managers' view of a new inventory paradigm
International Journal of Production Economics 133:(1) pp. 54–59. (2011)

Chikán A., Gelei A.: New Insight into the Competitiveness of Supplier Firms: Aligning Competences and Customer Expectations
SUPPLY CHAIN FORUM: INTERNATIONAL JOURNAL 11:(2) pp. 30–44. (2010)

Chikán A.: Co-ordination and public administration in a global economy – A Hungarian point of view
SOCIETY AND ECONOMY 31:(1) pp. 71–92. (2009)

Chikán A.: National and firm competitiveness: a general research model
COMPETITIVENESS REVIEW 18:(1-2) pp. 20–28. (2008)

Chikán A.: The New Role of Inventories in Business: Real World Changes and Research Consequences
International Journal of Production Economics 108:(1-2) pp. 54–62. (2007)

Chikán A.: The role of "Economics of Shortage" in the intellectual preparations for transition in Hungary
ACTA OECONOMICA 56:(2) pp. 195–207. (2006)

Chikán A., Demeter K.: Company Characteristics, Operations Competitiveness and Overall Performance
INTERNATIONAL JOURNAL OF OPERATIONS AND QUANTITATIVE MANAGEMENT 12:(2) pp. 107–125. (2006)

== See also ==
- Rajk László College for Advanced Studies
- Corvinus University of Budapest
- Hungarian Academy of Sciences

Political offices
Preceded by position established	Minister of Economy; 1998–1999	Succeeded by György Matolcsy
