= François Lumumba =

Congolese politician (born 1951)

President of the Mouvement National Congolais-Lumumba (main faction)
- Incumbent
- Assumed office 1982 or 1992

Personal details
- Born: 20 September 1951 (age 74) Stanleyville, Belgian Congo
- Political party: Mouvement National Congolais-Lumumba (MNC-L)
- Parent: Patrice Lumumba (father)
- Relatives: Guy-Patrice Lumumba (brother)
- Education: Economic University of Budapest; Graduate Institute of International Studies

François Emery Tolenga Lumumba, alternatively François Hemery Flory, (born 20 September 1951) is a Congolese politician, the son of Patrice Lumumba, and the leader of a faction of the Mouvement National Congolais-Lumumba (MNC-L).

François' father Patrice Lumumba was the first Prime Minister of the Democratic Republic of the Congo, but he was overthrown and murdered during the Congo Crisis. Already studying in Egypt for his own safety at the time of the assassination, François Lumumba spent the next decades in exile. He became a leading figure and eventually the party leader of a major faction of the MNC-L, the party of his father. In this position, he attempted to unite various exiled opposition groups and to support rebellions against the Congoloese dictator Mobutu Sese Seko. After Mobutu's downfall in the 1990s, Lumumba returned to the Democratic Republic of the Congo to participate in democratic politics and support efforts to stop the Second Congo War. He has achieved little success in national politics.

== Biography ==
=== Early life ===
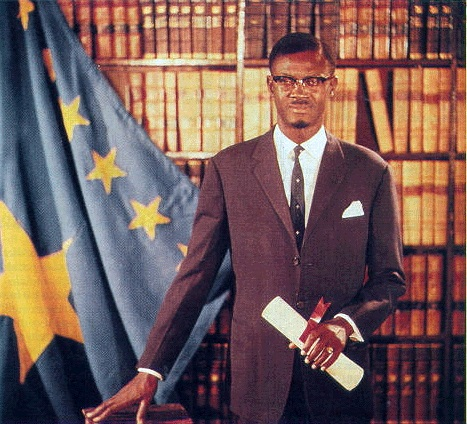
François' father Patrice Lumumba (pictured 1960) served as the first Prime Minister of the Democratic Republic of the Congo.

François Lumumba was born to Patrice Lumumba and Pauline Kie in Stanleyville (modern Kisangani), Congo, on 20 September 1951. At the time, the Congo was a Belgian colony. François' family situation was complex. His father Patrice was married three times, and his first two marriages had produced no children and had been divorced by the time of François' birth. By 1947, Patrice began an extramarital affair with Kie, and they lived together in Stanleyville from 1948. Though this relationship proved to be very close and durable, they never married. Instead, Lumumba requested his friends and family to arrange a new marriage with a girl from his home region in 1951. As it turned out, however, Kie was already pregnant by this time; soon after François' birth, his parents were forced to end their affair due to the arrival of Patrice's third wife, Pauline Opango, in Stanleyville. Regardless, Patrice continued to stay in touch with his former girlfriend and eldest son, supporting the two with money. Patrice Lumumba's continuing contacts with Kie were a major source of strife within the family. Despite Opango's disapproval, Patrice officially acknowledged François as his son, doing so at a time when Opango was visiting her parents in her home village in order to circumvent having to get her legal agreement.

When he reached school-going age, François began to live with his father's family. Patrice –who strongly favored modern education– sent François to a local European school. By 1957, the family was living in Léopoldville. In June 1960, the Congo became independent and Patrice Lumumba was elected as its first Prime Minister. The country quickly fell into a major crisis. Amid the upheaval, the Lumumba children faced harassment, resulting in most of them being sent abroad or to relatives for safety. François and his younger brother Patrice were brought to Egypt, whose President Gamal Abdel Nasser was supportive of their father. In September 1960, Prime Minister Lumumba was overthrown and murdered with support by Western powers, including Belgium. Afterwards, François' other siblings and his step-mother Pauline Opango also went into exile in Egypt. Under the protection of Nasser, the family was moved into a villa in Cairo's Zamalek district, while the Egyptian state paid their school fees. Many other Lumumbists also moved to Egypt. When Pauline Opango returned to the Congo in 1967, the children stayed behind, with Nasser insisting that they should be allowed to continue their studies. Nasser unexpectedly died in 1970, and his successor Anwar Sadat was much less supportive of the sympathizers and relatives of Lumumba, causing many –including François– to leave for Europe.

At some point, he began to study at the Economic University of Budapest where he obtained an undergraduate degree in 1978. Lumumba later studied at the Graduate Institute of International Studies in Geneva. Overall, François Lumumba spent 32 years in exile in Egypt and various European countries. At some point, he obtained a doctorate.

=== Political activity ===
By the 1970s, Lumumba had begun to become politically active. Using his family background, he unsuccessfully attempted to unite the infighting factions of the Mouvement National Congolais-Lumumba (MNC-L), the old party of Prime Minister Patrice Lumumba. However, François' position within the Lumumbist movement was repeatedly challenged. His uncle Albert Onawelho Lumumba became his most important rival for control of the MNC-L. Though François enjoyed some limited successes, he was unable to overcome the factionalism. By the start of the 1980s, the MNC-L was divided into many groups, one loyal to François, whereas two others were led by Kituka Munganga, and Léonard She Okitundu, while yet another group had split off entirely and formed the Parti Démocratique Congolais (PDC). In 1982, a series of MNC congresses in Brussels, Paris, and Cologne acknowledged François Lumumba as the head of the reorganized party. (Note: According to researcher Karen Bouwer, François Lumumba became MNC-L party leader in 1992. This possibly references Lumumba's attempt at party unification in November 1992.) According to researcher Michel Luntumbue, François remained one of the MNC-L main faction's leaders over the course of the 1980s, though other individuals continued to challenge his position.

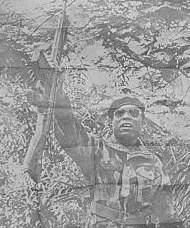
Around 1985, François Lumumba attempted to organize a rebel alliance, including with the forces led by Nathaniel Mbumba (pictured).

Lumumba eventually became involved in the activities of the militant Congolese opposition-in-exile. At the time, various groups existed which attempted to mobilize an insurgency against Mobutu Sese Seko, the dictator of the Congo (then renamed "Zaire") since 1965. Several of the exiled militant groups were splinters and factions of the MNC-L. Around 1985, he was in Tripoli and helped to organize an alliance between MNC-L forces, a rebel group called "Front for the Liberation of Congo – Patrice Lumumba" (FLC-L), and Nathaniel Mbumba's Congolese National Liberation Front. However, this alliance was unable to start an effective rebellion against Mobutu. The MNC-L also continued to suffer from factionalism and splintered into further groups during this period.

In November 1992, he again attempted to unite the various Lumumbist parties into one force, but this attempt failed. Regardless, Lumumba remained the President of the MNC-L's main faction. In 1997, Mobutu was overthrown as a result of the First Congo War, soon followed by the even more destructive Second Congo War as various factions fought for the control of the country and its resources. In 1998, Lumumba criticized the new Congoloese government of Laurent-Désiré Kabila, accusing it of denying freedom of expression to the Lumumba family. In 2000, Lumumba was temporarily detained by the Kabila government. A Mai-Mai militia calling itself "Lumumbist National Resistance" kidnapped twenty foreigners in 2001 in order to raise international attention to the warfare in the Congo. The group demanded that negotiations for the hostages involve François Lumumba, hoping that this would showcase their commitment to Lumumbism. After six days of talks, Lumumba was able to convince the Mai-Mai to release the hostages without conditions.

In 2002, the Belgian government expressed "sincere regrets" over the assassination of Patrice Lumumba to François. Around this time, he also attempted to involve himself in the Inter-Congolese Dialogue, a series of negotiations which attempted to find a peaceful solution to the Second Congo War. By March 2006, Lumumba had to deal with conflicts within his party, as the position of MNC-L provincial president for Orientale Province was disputed. He threw his support behind Joseph Amuri in this conflict. He ran as a National Assembly candidate in the July 2006 Democratic Republic of the Congo general election. In the same election, he supported his younger brother Guy-Patrice's candidacy for President of the Democratic Republic of the Congo. According to journalist Colette Braeckmann, François was financially ruined by his funding of Guy-Patrice's campaigns.

After a Belgian judge ruled that Patrice Lumumba's remains had to be returned from Belgium to his family in 2020, François publicly expressed his and his family's gratitude to everyone who had contributed to this ruling. In 2022, the remains of Patrice Lumumba were repatriated to the DR Congo. In his position as MNC-L leader and son, François used the opportunity to express his hope that his father's nationalist spirit would help the Congolese to defend their country from enemies, considering the then-ongoing M23 offensive.

== Family ==
François has one half-sister by his mother Pauline Kie, and two half-brothers, namely Guy-Patrice and Roland-Gilbert, as well as two more half-sisters, Juliana and Marie-Christine, through his step-mother Pauline Opango.

François has at least one son, Chez Teddy Lumumba, who is active as a musician.
