= Opango =

Opango is a surname. Notable people with the surname include:

- David Opango (born 1978), Burundian footballer
- Joachim Yhombi-Opango (1939–2020), Congolese politician
- Pauline Opango (1937–2014), Congolese activist and the wife of Patrice Lumumba
