= Herbert Simon Award (Rajk College) =

Award for business and management scholarship

- Awarded for: Outstanding contribution to business and management research, effect on the College's research directions.
- Country: Hungary, Budapest
- Presented by: Rajk László College for Advanced Studies
- First award: 2005
- Website: https://rajk.kir-dev.hu/awards/herbert-simon

The Herbert Simon Award was established in 2004 by the Rajk László College for Advanced Studies. It is given annually to an outstanding scholar in the field of business and management whose works have contributed to the understanding or solving of practical business problems, and had a substantial influence over a long period of time on the studies and intellectual activity of the students at the college.

This award is given by students, to whom they rated the highest. The students select the nominees and vote for the prize-winner in the Assembly of the college after a review and debate regarding the selected names.

== Recipients ==
The award was given to the following scholars:

Year	Awardee	Institution	Nationality
2005	James G. March	Stanford University	United States
2006	Henry Mintzberg	McGill University	Canada
2007	Michael C. Jensen	Harvard University	United States
2008	Robert M. Grant	Bocconi University	United States
2009	C. K. Prahalad	University of Michigan Ross School of Business	India
2010	Håkan Håkansson	BI Norwegian School of Management	Sweden
2011	David Teece	University of California, Berkeley Haas School of Business	New Zealand
2012	Pankaj Ghemawat	IESE Business School	India
2013	Aswath Damodaran	NYU Stern School of Business	India
2014	Clayton M. Christensen	Harvard Business School	United States
2015	Erik Brynjolfsson	MIT Sloan School of Management	United States
2016	Jeffrey Pfeffer	Stanford University	United States
2017	Sinan Aral	MIT Sloan School of Management	United States
2018	Amy Wrzesniewski	Yale University	United States
2019	James E. Austin	Harvard Business School	United States
2020	Henry Chesbrough	University of California, Berkeley Haas School of Business	United States
2021	Marshall Van Alstyne	Boston University	United States
2022	Amy Edmondson	Harvard Business School	United States
2023	Mats Alvesson	Lund University	Sweden
2024	Russell Coff	University of Wisconsin-Madison	United States

== See also ==
- Herbert A. Simon
- Rajk László College for Advanced Studies
- John von Neumann Award
