= Herbert Simon Award =

Herbert Simon Award may refer to:

- Herbert Simon Award (Rajk College), given by Rajk College for Advanced Studies
- Herbert Simon Award (IACAP), given by the International Association for Computing and Philosophy
- Herbert Simon Award (APSA), given by the American Political Science Association
- Herbert Simon Award (NECSI), given by the New England Complex Systems Institute
- Herbert A. Simon Award for Teaching Excellence in Computer Science, given by the Carnegie Mellon School of Computer Science
