= Lutula =

Lutula is a surname. Notable people with the surname include:

- Jean-Paul Eale Lutula (born 1984), Rwandan footballer
- Joseph Lutula (1927–2008), Congolese politician
