= Széchenyi István College for Advanced Studies =

- Széchenyi István Szakkollégium
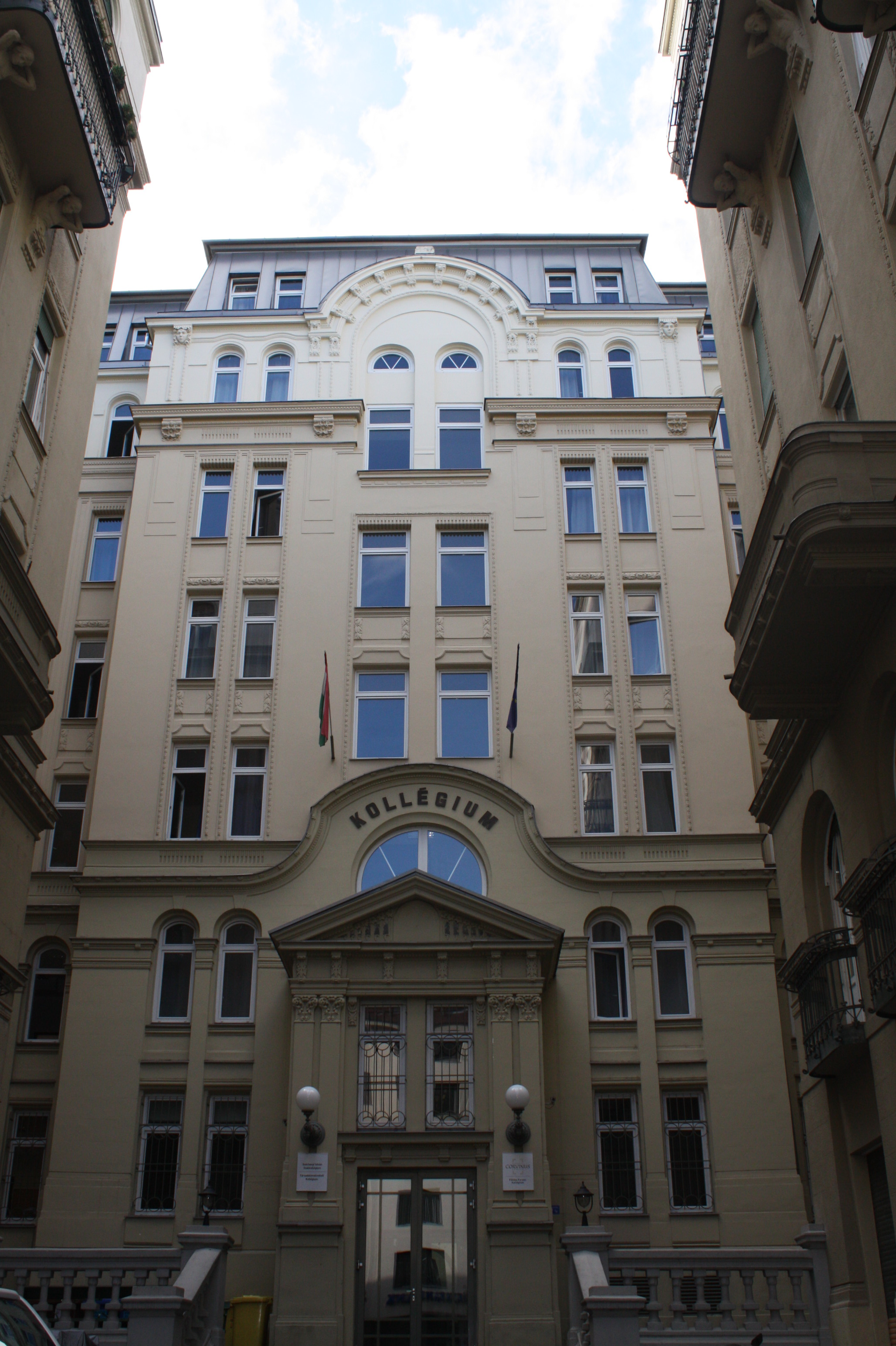
- The old main facade of the college
- Budapest; Hungary

Information
- Type: Private college
- Established: 1987
- Principal: Daniel Szokolics
- Enrollment: 93
- Campus: Urban
- Colours: blue and orange
- Affiliations: Corvinus University of Budapest, Eötvös Loránd University, Central European University
- Alumni: ~300
- Website: http://szisz.hu

The Széchenyi István College for Advanced Studies (Hungarian: Széchenyi István Szakkollégium – SZISZ) is a distinctive member of the college-movement, consisting of several similar colleges, operating in the Hungarian system of higher education. The college was founded in 1987 as a self-organised, autonomous institution by the students of the Karl Marx University of Economic Sciences, based on the model of the existing colleges. Its main goal is to enable its members to achieve a high level of proficiency in economics and social sciences, and to master their academic skills in a democratic, deeply communal environment. Its members are students of universities of Budapest, mainly studying at the Corvinus University of Budapest and the Eötvös Loránd University. Besides the academic benefits, the college also offers its members accommodation. Based on its two-decade-long experience in student association activities, the college actively contributes to the shaping of university public life.

== History ==
From the late 1980s, political thaw contributed to an intensifying public life at the universities of Budapest. The Central Europe Club was one of the self-organising groups at the Karl Marx University of Economic Sciences, which dedicated itself to organising lectures and debates, thereby serving as an opportunity for students to reflect on current challenges of Central Europe. These events were important scenes of political self-organisation in the era prior to the regime change. The more popular the lectures became, the more the members felt that they needed to establish their own community in a professional structure as a College for Advanced Studies.

The Széchenyi István College for Advanced Studies was founded by 30 students on 22 February 1987. The college was named after István Széchenyi, one of the greatest statesmen in Hungarian history as a tribute to the renowned politician, theorist, and writer. The college was soon officially acknowledged by the Karl Marx University as one of its colleges for advanced studies along with the Rajk László College for Advanced Studies and the College for Advanced Studies in Social Theory. The Organisational and Operational Rules of the college were adopted in September 1987, when the first officials were elected as well.

After the regime change, the college established itself as a politically neutral professional institution with the aim of providing cutting-edge knowledge to its members, supplementary to university education. During the 90s, membership of the college gradually expanded, while at the same time, the education system was refined by the establishment of the framework of courses and their supervision.

Students of fields other than economics or social sciences were admitted to the college first in 1993. Since then, the diversity in the educational background of the membership has become a fundamental element of the college's identity.

It has always been important for the college to maintain close relationship with the Hungarian-speaking minority in neighbouring countries. During the final years of the communist regimes in East-Central Europe, members travelled through the Hungarian-Romanian border, bringing aid and supplies in their backpacks. For the past two decades the college has organised a Finance Summer University for Hungarian-speaking students from the neighbouring countries

The 2000s (decade) were characterised by a constant development in the professional functioning of the college. As a result of the changes in the Hungarian higher education, a new framework of courses was adopted in 2005, which is built upon several 4-semester-long compulsory programmes.

== Professional operation ==
The goal of the educational system of the college is to endow its members with high-level literacy in the field of economics and social sciences, which makes them competitive anywhere in the world. The primary tools for achieving these results are the courses. Year in year out, the college puts great efforts into organising up to par courses for its members, held by tutors who are well prepared and are considered to be experts in their respective academic field or profession. These courses are consisted of a maximum of 8 students and the members of the college have to prepare on a weekly bases by going through relevant scientific texts, and debating them under the coordination of the lecturer. The courses are completed by submitting an academic essay and a related presentation or other forms of assessment, such as tests.

The educational system is built upon four different programmes. Each programme consists of four semesters of intensive courses, which together provide a structured overview of a given discipline. Every member of the college has to choose one of these upon admission.

- Public Economics: The programme consists of a preparation semester, when the students acquire strong microeconomic knowledge, providing a sufficient foundation for the scientific work in the following semesters. The main topics that are discussed during the remainder of the programme are the following: the questions of public economics, the theory of public choice, and various policy fields.
- Law and Economics: The preparation semester consists of establishing a strong microeconomic and basic legal knowledge that is necessary for the programme. Later on, the students deal with the economic analysis of constitutional law, criminal law, administrative law, and civil law. The discipline of law and economics was first taught as an organised course within Hungary by the Széchenyi István College for Advanced Studies and most of the leading researchers on the topic in Hungary are affiliated with the college.
- Financial economics: Because of the strong financial education at the Corvinus University of Budapest, which is compulsory for every student of the Faculty of Business Administration and the Faculty of Economics, the programme focuses on complementing that knowledge, by giving its students a more practical approach. The main topics that are discussed during the programme are: investments, mathematical and statistical methodologies, and later on, with the help of lecturers working at the Central Bank of Hungary, the students deal with the overlapping area of macroeconomics and finance.
- Sociology: The purpose of the programme is to endow students with the necessary methodological and theoretical knowledge that makes them able to conduct theoretically sound empirical research on the field of sociology. In the preparation semester, the programme introduces the students into sociological theory and tries to help them acquire an analytical approach. In the following semesters, the students learn model-building, quantitative methodology, and finally they write up a research proposal, using the formerly gained theoretical knowledge.

Besides the compulsory courses of the chosen programme, the members have to attend certain skill development courses (e.g. academic writing) and so-called knowledge widening courses, which encompasses a large variety of topics that are different every semester (e.g. cultural anthropology, applied ethics, game theory etc.). Furthermore, the college has many annual professional events such as the Finance Summer University, which is organised for Hungarian-speaking students from the neighbouring countries; the Autumn Block Seminars, where the students can choose from different sections held by renowned experts; the Winter Camp, with lectures, related to the scientific profile of the college. The college also organises lectures, conferences and Summer Universities on a regular basis for a broader audience. Other prominent events organised by the college include international conferences, like the Negative Ties and Social Networks Workshop and the annual lecture about the achievements of the Nobel-laureates in Economics.

There are very strict academic conditions for graduating from the college, which every member has to accomplish. These are: completion of the courses of the chosen programme, completion of at least two knowledge widening course, completion of the compulsory skill development courses, completion of a Master's degree on university level, submission of at least one Scientific Student Circle paper, completion of a research course.

== Organisation and functioning ==
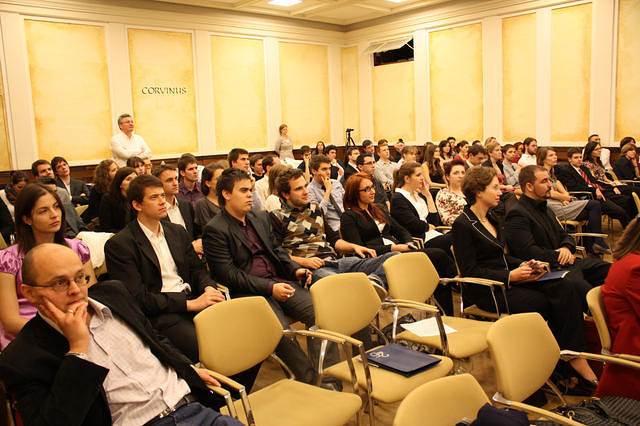
Members of the College for Advanced Studies at a conference

Everyday operation and strategic planning in the college are based on three pillars: i) academic and professional excellence, ii) strong community iii) social awareness and responsibility. Through establishing these, the institution is governed by the main principles of self-governance and sound democracy. Thus, the college strives to provide an environment for its members that highly motivates intellectual advancement and emergence as social, pro-active, and socially responsible citizens.

Autonomous and democratic decision-making is ensured by the regular meetings of the General Assembly of the college, and the transparent and independent functioning of three elected committees governing the college in different aspects. This structure is reflected in the Organisational and Operational Rules of the college. The decision-making process is mainly driven by the intention of achieving consensus through finding the common ground between potentially different views, facilitating constructive debate, while maintaining the efficient functioning of the college.

In line with the principle of self-governance, the main decision-making authority of the college is the General Assembly, which makes strategic decisions, and elects members and operative leaders of the three committees responsible for day-to-day functioning. The Student Committee manages the operative and financial agendas of the college. The leader of the Student Committee is also responsible for representing the college. The Committee for Academic Activities coordinates the academic and professional life of the college, organising the courses, conferences, and various other activities. The Recruitment Committee is responsible for promoting the college, as well as the recruitment and integration of new members to the community.

The Director and the two Vice Directors, elected from former graduates of the college, help by providing their experience, and taking part in formally representing the college. The close relationship between the college and the alumni is very important, not only as a source of support for potential teachers, who are also scholars and experts, but also as an addition to the social and professional network of the college.

== Social awareness ==
Social awareness is a general characteristic of Hungarian Colleges for Advanced Studies as it forms the third pillar of their activities. In line with its core values, Széchenyi István College of Advanced Studies engages in initiatives that strengthen awareness in its members towards the problems of society and contribute to research-related activities of the members of the Sociology programme.

In 2009, the 'Fresco Village' Project was launched in Bódvalenke, Borsod County, where monumental murals were painted on the walls, thus making the deprived village famous. The college initiated its own project to help young Roma people in the village and hosted groups of children in Budapest. In 2012, members of the college spent a week in Bódvalenke and conducted research on nutritional habits of the villagers in cooperation with Ecolab. This research lab for sustainability is part of the Moholy-Nagy University of Art and Design.

== See also ==
- Professional fraternity
- Corvinus University of Budapest
- Eötvös Loránd University
- Central European University
- Rajk László College for Advanced Studies
- College for Advanced Studies in Social Theory
