= Enikő Mihalik =

Hungarian model

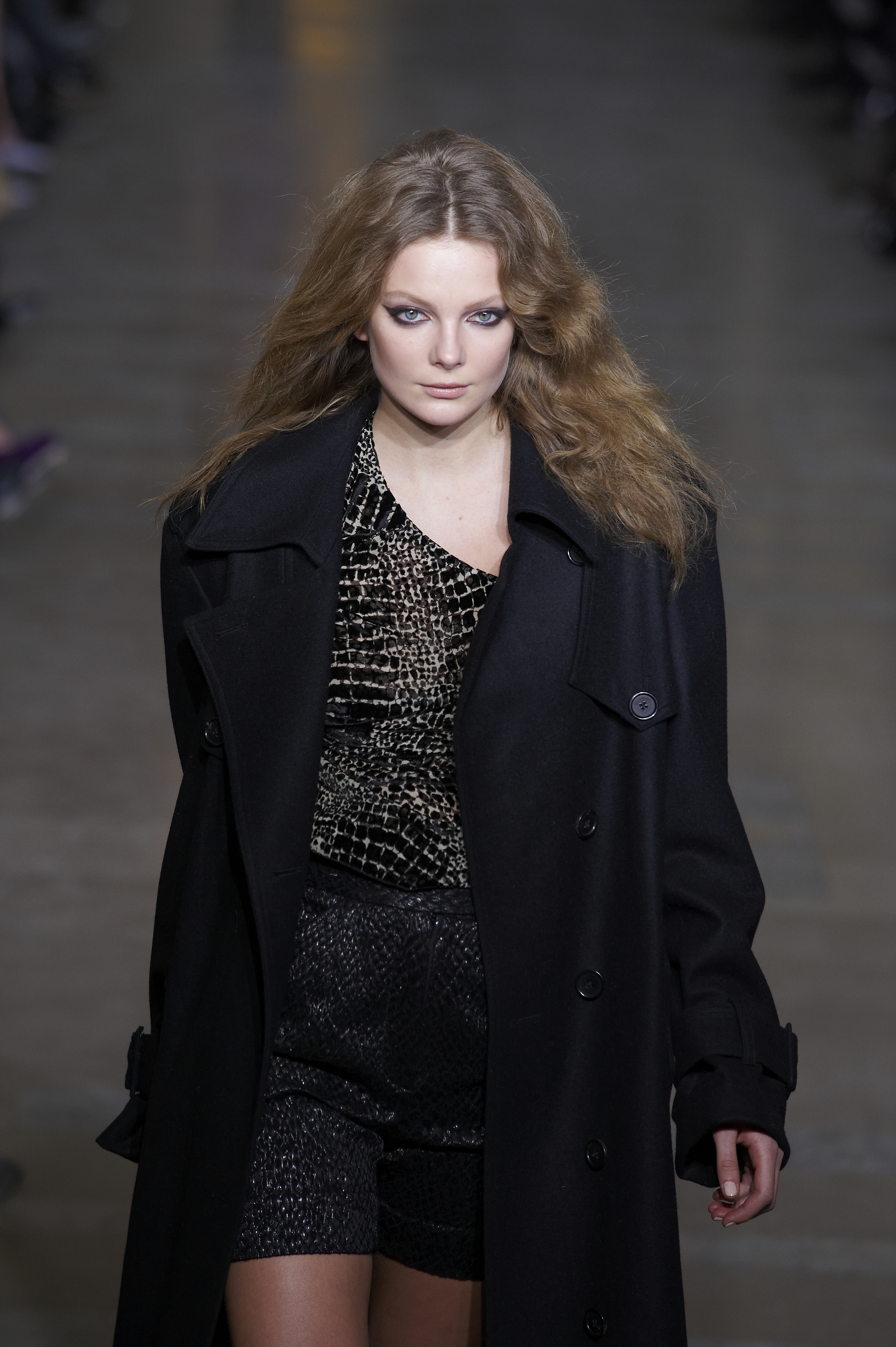
- Mihalik on the catwalk for Jill Stuart in 2010
- Born: 11 May 1987 (age 39); Békéscsaba, Hungary
- Modeling information
- Height: 1.79 m (5 ft 10 1/2 in)
- Hair color: Blonde
- Eye color: Green
- Agency: The Society Management (New York); Elite Model Management (Paris, Amsterdam, Copenhagen, Toronto); Why Not Model Management (Milan); Premier Model Management (London); Uno Models (Barcelona); Visage Models Management (Budapest); Modellink (Gothenburg); SPIN Model Management (Hamburg); Two Management (Los Angeles); MP Stockholm (Stockholm); Switch Models (Tokyo); Option Model Agency (Zurich)

Enikő Mihalik (Hungarian pronunciation: [ˈɛnikøː ˈmihɒlik]; born 11 May 1987) is a Hungarian model who rose to prominence after placing 4th in the Elite Model Look 2002 and is known for her work with Dutch photography team Inez van Lamsweerde and Vinoodh Matadin.

== Career ==
Enikő Mihalik was born on 11 May 1987 in Békéscsaba, Hungary, the seat of the Hungarian Békés County. When she was young, her classmates often teased her about her thin physique, some claiming it was caused by illness. She was discovered by a Valve scout in a shopping mall when she was 15 years old. In 2002, she entered into the Hungarian Elite Model Look and won.

With her win, she moved on to the international level of the competition, held in Tunis, Tunisia. She placed 4th, losing to Ana Mihajlovic of Yugoslavia. Her career started on the runway. She debuted at the Chanel haute couture show JUL 2006. She walked for only a few designers each season thereafter, but in the S/S 09 shows, she got her big break. She walked for over 50 designers internationally, including Shiatzy Chen, Givenchy, Blumarine, Moschino, Diane von Furstenberg, and Versace. Mihalik was one of the fresh faces to land in one of the fourteen covers of V magazine fall 2008 issue; the other fresh faces were Anna Selezneva, and Abbey Lee Kershaw. Each cover boasts a head shot of a famous model, either from the new crop of leading models (Agyness Deyn, Lara Stone, Natasha Poly, Anja Rubik, Daria Werbowy etc.) or the supermodel era (Christy Turlington, Naomi Campbell, Eva Herzigova), it was lensed by duo Inez van Lamsweerde and Vinoodh Matadin.

Her campaign work includes Cesare Paciotti, Gucci, Kenzo, MaxMara, Samsonite by Viktor & Rolf, and Barneys New York. She has also worked with Retro and Paola Frani.

Her face is also seen regularly in magazines, occasionally on covers. This has included the cover of top fashion magazines i-D, V, Self Service, and most recently Vogue Japan and Vogue Italia Beauty. Her face is also seen in the pages of Vogue and Numéro.

Her most recent cover is for the June 2013 issue of Elle Brazil.

Mihalik is currently ranked No. 28 on the Models.com Top 50-Women List.

She walked in the 2009 Victoria's Secret Fashion Show in New York City and 2014 in London. Mihalik's looks have been compared to Daria Werbowy's because of her eyes.

She was chosen to be in the 2010 Pirelli Calendar photographed by Terry Richardson in Bahia, Brazil.

Mihalik was the Playboy Playmate of the Month for December 2016.

In 2019 Eniko appeared in the December issue of Harper's Bazaar Ukraine's edition.

== Personal life ==
Mihalik is friends with models Iekeliene Stange and Barbara Palvin. She dated Danish footballer Mathias Jørgensen and businessman Vladimir Restoin Roitfeld.

In March 2021, she married Dávid Korányi, chief advisor of city diplomacy for Budapest mayor Gergely Karácsony. They had a daughter in July.

Amberleigh West	Kristy Garett	Dree Hemingway	Camille Rowe	Brook Power	Josie Canseco
Ali Michael	Valerie van der Graaf	Kelly Gale	Allie Silva	Ashley Smith	Enikő Mihalik
