= Superprofit =

Marxist concept

Superprofit, surplus profit or extra surplus-value (German: extra-Mehrwert) is a concept in Karl Marx's critique of political economy subsequently elaborated by Vladimir Lenin and other Marxist thinkers.

== Origin of the concept in Karl Marx's Capital ==
The term superprofit (extra surplus-value) was first used by Marx in Das Kapital. It refers to above-average enterprise profits, arising in three main situations:

- Technologically advanced firms operating at above average productivity in a competitive growing market.
- Under conditions of declining demand, only firms with above-average productivity would obtain the previous socially average profit rate as the rest would book lower profits.
- Monopolies of resources or technologies, yielding what are effectively land rents, mining rents, or technological rents.

== Lenin's interpretation ==
According to Leninism, superprofits are extracted from the workers in colonial (or Third World) countries by the imperialist powers (in the First World). Part of these superprofits are then distributed (in the form of increased living standards) to the workers in the imperialists' home countries in order to buy their loyalty, achieve political stability and avoid a workers' revolution, usually by means of reformist labor parties. The workers who receive a large enough share of the superprofits have an interest to defend the capitalist system, so they become a labor aristocracy.

Superprofit in Marxist–Leninist theory is the result of unusually severe exploitation or superexploitation. All capitalist profit in Marxist–Leninist theory is based on exploitation (the business owners extract surplus value from the workers), but superprofit is achieved by taking exploitation above and beyond its normal level. In Marxism–Leninism, there are no profits that could result from an activity or transaction that did not involve exploitation.

== Ernest Mandel's theory ==
Ernest Mandel argues in his book Late Capitalism that the frontline of capitalist development is always ruled by the search for surplus-profits (above-average returns).

Mandel argues that the growth pattern of modern capitalism is shaped by the quest for surplus-profits in monopolistic and oligopolistic markets in which a few large corporations dominate supply. Thus, the extra or above-average profits do not arise so much from real productivity gains, but from corporations monopolising access to resources, technologies and markets. It is not so much that enterprises with superior productivity outsell competitors, but that competitors are blocked in various ways from competing, for example through cartelisation, mergers, fusions, take-overs, government-sanctioned licensing, exclusive production and selling rights. In that case, the extra profits have less to do with reward for entrepreneurship than with market position and market power, i.e. the ability to offload business costs onto someone else (the state, consumers and other businesses) and force consumers to pay extra for access to the goods and services they buy, based on supply monopolies.

Tibor Palánkai instead argues that while superprofit can be monopolistic profit, abusing monopoly position is regulated by rigorous competition policies in developed democratic countries. Superprofit coming from other sources like comparative advantages or technical innovation contribute to public welfare.

== See also ==
- New Imperialism
- Neo-colonialism
- Profit (economics)
- Overexploitation
- Surplus value
- Unequal exchange
