= Tamas Kadar (entrepreneur) =

Hungarian entrepreneur and technology executive

Template:Prod deletion endorsed Tamas Kadar is a Hungarian entrepreneur and the co-founder of SEON, a company specialising in fraud prevention and risk management technology, and serves as it's chief executive officer.

== Early life and career ==
Kádár studied at Corvinus University of Budapest, where he earned a bachelor's degree in ICT business analysis.

Kádár co-founded SEON in 2017. The company develops software used by businesses to identify and prevent fraudulent transactions and assess financial risk.

Before founding SEON, Kádár was involved in ventures related to cryptocurrency platforms. This experience preceded his work in fraud prevention and online security.

Under Kádár's leadership, SEON expanded its operations and developed products for businesses in sectors including financial services, e-commerce and online platforms. The company's software is used for fraud detection and financial crime prevention.
