= Jody Hoffer Gittell =

- Citizenship: American
- Known for: Relational Coordination Theory

Academic background
- Education: Reed College (BA); The New School for Social Research (MA); MIT Sloan School of Management (PhD)

Academic work
- Discipline: Management, organizational theory
- Institutions: Harvard Business School; Brandeis University

Jody Hoffer Gittell is an American organizational theorist and professor of management at The Heller School for Social Policy and Management at Brandeis University, where she also serves as PhD Program Director. She is known for developing Relational Coordination Theory.

Gittell is executive director of the Relational Coordination Research Collaborative and chief executive officer of Relational Coordination Analytics.

According to her Google Scholar profile, Gittell's research has been cited more than 18,000 times, and she has an h-index of 47.

== Education ==
Gittell received a Bachelor of Arts in political science from Reed College in 1985, a Master of Arts in political economy from The New School for Social Research in 1991, and a PhD in industrial relations and human resource management from the MIT Sloan School of Management in 1995.

== Career ==
Gittell began her academic career as an assistant professor at Harvard Business School, where she taught from 1995 to 2001. She joined the Heller School at Brandeis University in 2001 as an assistant professor, was promoted to associate professor in 2006, and to professor in 2008. She served as MBA Program Director from 2006 to 2008 and has served as PhD Program Director since 2025.

She founded the Relational Coordination Research Collaborative in 2011 and has served as its executive director since. In 2013, she co-founded Relational Coordination Analytics with Stanley Wallack and Saleema Moore, serving as chief scientific officer from 2013 to 2021, when she became chief executive officer.

Gittell has held visiting positions at the MIT Sloan School of Management and the Harvard Graduate School of Education, and served as acting director of the MIT Leadership Center from 2010 to 2011.

== Research ==
Gittell developed Relational Coordination theory, which proposes that highly interdependent work is coordinated most effectively through relationships characterized by shared goals, shared knowledge, and mutual respect, supported by communication that is frequent, timely, accurate, and oriented toward problem solving.

In a nine-hospital study of patient care published in Organization Science, Gittell and colleagues found that high-performance work practices such as selecting employees for teamwork, rewarding team performance, and investing in frontline leadership strengthened relational coordination among doctors, nurses, and other care providers.

With Anne Douglass, Gittell developed the concept of relational bureaucracy, published in the Academy of Management Review.

Gittell has developed a relational model of organizational change, drawing on insights from organizational scholars such as Edgar Schein and Amy Edmondson. The model proposes that sustainable organizational change begins with changes in patterns of relationships among participants, supported by interventions that foster psychological safety and encourage humble inquiry. Within this framework, structural changes can reinforce new relational patterns but are not sufficient on their own to produce lasting change.

Related research conducted with Abraham Carmeli found that relational coordination contributes to psychological safety, thereby enhancing participants' ability to learn from failures and mistakes within organizations.

== Awards and honors ==
- Sloan Industry Studies Best Book Award, Alfred P. Sloan Foundation (2005)
- Douglas McGregor Memorial Award for Best Paper of the Year, Journal of Applied Behavioral Science (2008)
- Best Paper Award, Human Resources Division, Academy of Management (2008)
- Outstanding Young Scholar, Labor and Employment Relations Association (2004)

== Selected publications ==
=== Books ===
- The Southwest Airlines Way: Using the Power of Relationships to Achieve High Performance. McGraw-Hill, 2003.
- Up in the Air: How the Airlines Can Improve Performance by Engaging Their Employees. Cornell University Press, 2009 (with G. Bamber, T. A. Kochan, and A. von Nordenflycht).
- High Performance Healthcare: Using the Power of Relationships to Achieve Quality, Efficiency and Resilience. McGraw-Hill, 2009.
- Sociology of Organizations: Structures and Relationships. Sage Publications, 2011 (with M. Godwyn).
- Transforming Relationships for High Performance: The Power of Relational Coordination. Stanford University Press, 2016.
- Relational Analytics: Guidelines for Analysis and Action. Routledge, 2021 (with H. N. Ali).

=== Journal articles ===
- Gittell, J. H. (2002). "Coordinating Mechanisms in Care Provider Groups: Relational Coordination as a Mediator and Input Uncertainty as a Moderator of Performance Effects." Management Science, 48(11): 1408–1426.
- Gittell, J. H., & Douglass, A. (2012). "Relational Bureaucracy: Structuring Reciprocal Relationships into Roles." Academy of Management Review, 37(4): 709–733.
- Gittell, J. H., Seidner, R., & Wimbush, J. (2010). "A Relational Model of How High-Performance Work Systems Work." Organization Science, 21(2): 490–506.
- Bolton, R., Logan, C. K., & Gittell, J. H. (2021). "Revisiting Relational Coordination: A Systematic Review." Journal of Applied Behavioral Science, 57(3): 290–322.
