= Előd Takáts =

Hungarian economist and politician

Rector of Corvinus University of Budapest
- In office 1 August 2021 – 31 July 2023
- Preceded by: András Lánczi
- Succeeded by: Bruno van Pottelsberghe

Personal details
- Born: November 4, 1975 (age 50) Budapest, Hungary
- Children: 5
- Education: Corvinus University of Budapest; Central European University; Princeton University
- Occupation: economist, professor

Előd Takáts (born 4 November 1975) is a Hungarian economist, professor, economist and adviser at the Bank for International Settlements. He served as rector of Corvinus University of Budapest between 2021 and 2023. He is also visiting professor at the London School of Economics and Political Science.

== Studies ==
In 1999, Takáts graduated with honours from the Budapest University of Economics and Business Administration (the predecessor of Corvinus University of Budapest) with a degree in finance, and minor in economic policy. In 2002, he obtained a master's degree in economics from the Central European University. He then continued his studies at Princeton University in the US, where he obtained a PhD in financial economics in 2006.

In addition to his studies, in 2000 he successfully passed the stock exchange examination of the Budapest Stock Exchange.

== Professional career ==
He worked as a student at the treasury of commercial bank Kereskedelmi és Hitelbank (1998) and as equity analyst at ABN AMRO Equities (1998–1999). After graduating, he worked in the securities department of CIB Bank from 1999 to 2000 and as a senior consultant at Postabank (Hungary) from 2001 to 2002. He worked at the Hungarian National Bank, the European Central Bank and the Federal Reserve Bank of New York, among others.

=== International Monetary Fund ===
As an economist at the International Monetary Fund he worked across multiple departments and countries, with his final assignment focusing on China.

=== Bank for International Settlements ===
He was an economist, senior economist and then principal economist at the Bank for International Settlements (BIS) between 2009 and 2021. Between 2009 and 2016, he worked on emerging market issues, and from 2016 on financial regulation. Upon returning to the BIS, he served as adviser (chief of staff) to the Deputy General Manager and later became Deputy Head of the Committee on the Global Financial System (CGFS) Secretariat.

=== Corvinus University of Budapest ===
In addition to his work, he was a regular guest lecturer at Corvinus University of Budapest for various courses and conferences. In recognition of this, on 17 September 2019, the Senate of the university awarded him the title of honorary professor in recognition of his "outstanding teaching, research and development activities." On 3 March 2021, President János Áder appointed him professor with effect from 10 March 2021.

President János Áder appointed him rector of Corvinus University of Budapest on 24 June 2021, with effect from 1 August 2021, following the support of the university's Senate. During his tenure, the university introduced initiatives such as the Illyés Gyula program, which involves cooperation between faculty and students.

== Academic assignments ==
Since 2018, he has been a visiting professor at the School of Public Policy at the London School of Economics and Political Science.

He serves as Member of the Board of the Hungarian Economists' Association and as President of the Monetary Policy Section. He is also member of the Editorial Board of the Hungarian Economic Review and President of the Editorial Board of the Public Finance Quarterly.
