= Éva Hegedüs =

Hungarian economist

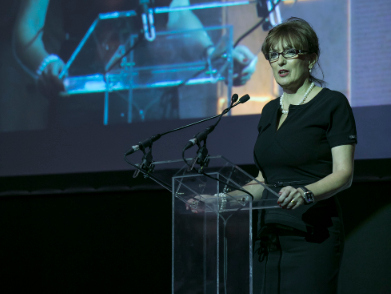
- Born: 13 September 1957 (age 68); Eger, Hungary
- Education: Budapest University of Economics
- Occupation: Economist
- Known for: Gránit Bank, Chairman-CEO
- Children: 2

Éva Hegedüs (born in Eger, Hungary on 13 September 1957) is an economist, the founding Chairman-CEO and shareholder through E.P.M. Ltd. of Gránit Bank.

Since 2013, she has been a member of the Board of the Hungarian Banking Association, representing middle-sized and small banks. She has been General Secretary of the Magyar Közgazdasági Társaság (in English: Hungarian Economic Association) since 2014. In 2023 Forbes magazine recognised her as the most influential Hungarian businesswoman for the fifth time. Starting from June 15, 2019, she is the social chair of the Hungarian Water Polo Federation.

== Career ==
She graduated from the Budapest University of Economics with a major degree. Her first job was at the Ipargazdasági és Üzemszervezési Intézetben (in English: Institute of Industrial Economics and Business Administration), where she worked as a research fellow. Thereafter, her career continued in government institutions between 1981 and 1996. From 1993, she was Deputy Secretary of State in the Pénzügyminisztérium (in English: Ministry of Finance) and later even in the Gazdasági Minisztérium (in English: Ministry of Economic Affairs). She participated in the preparation of a number of Hungarian pieces of legislation, such as the Credit Institutions Act and the Bankruptcy Act. Later she joined the Földhitel- és Jelzálogbank (in English: Land Loan and Mortgage Bank) in 1997, where she became the Deputy Chief Executive Officer and organized the resumption of mortgage bond issuance in Hungary.

Between 2000 and 2002, she was the Deputy State Secretary for Strategic and Energy Affairs at the Gazdasági Minisztérium (Ministry of Economy) and was responsible for the regulation of the liberalization of the Hungarian energy sector and the regulation of housing loans. From 2002 to 2006 she headed the retail division of the Országos Takarékpénztár és Kereskedelmi Bank Rt. (OTP) and she became the president of the Housing Savings of the OTP Bank as well.

At the request of Sándor Demján, she took over the management of Gránit Bank in 2010. She has become the CEO and the Vice President of the Board of Directors there. She has been a shareholder since the start, and she became one of the largest private shareholders in 2015 following the share transaction concluded with Sándor Demján. The development of GRÁNIT Bank's digital business model is credited to Hegedüs. Under this model in July 2017, the bank, which primarily provides its services through electronic channels, launched a completely online account opening process using video identification.

In 2018, she became a member of the Board of Directors of Takarék Jelzálogbank Plc., a position she resigned from in July 2022.

At the end of 2021, Tiberis Digital Kft., which is linked to István Tiborcz, bought the majority stake in the bank from Éva Hegedüs, while Hegedüs continued to lead Gránit Bank as CEO, and remained a minority shareholder.

She is currently a member of the Board of the “Magyar Közgazdasági Társaság Pénzügyi Szakosztály” (in English: Finance Section of the Hungarian Economic Association). In 2020, at the assembly for renewal of the term of office, Éva Hegedüs was appointed Secretary General of the Hungarian Economic Association for the third consecutive time.

Éva Hegedüs is the Social President of the Hungarian Water Polo Federation since June 2019.

In 2023, Hegedüs was elected a member of the Board of the Hungarian Banking Association for the fourth time.

In 2023, Gránit Bank, which she led, became the 9th largest bank in the Hungarian market and closed its tenth consecutive profitable year with a pre-tax profit of HUF 22 billion and a balance sheet total of more than HUF 1,200 billion.

She is the Chairman of the Supervisory Board of the MÁV Group and Volánbusz from 2023.

In 2024, she also received the top prize in the Mastercard Bank of the Year competition, the "Bank of the Year" award, as CEO of Gránit Bank.

== Awards ==
- In 2015, at the ‘MasterCard - Bank of the Year’ awards, Éva Hegedüs was elected as Banker of the Year by Hungarian bank managers.
- In 2016, Éva Hegedüs received the Female Manager of the Year award at the PWA Successful Women's Association Gala.
- In 2017, Mihály Varga, Minister of National Economy recognised her decades-long outstanding work in the financial and banking sectors by giving her the “Magyar Gazdaságért” (For the Hungarian Economy) Award.
- She has been included in Forbes’ list of the 50 Most Influential Women of Hungary four times; between 2019 and 2023 the magazine named her as The Most Influential Hungarian Businesswoman. In 2018, she ranked second and in 2017 third in the business category.
- In 2020, she won the “Outstanding Volunteer for Financial Culture Development Award” of Pénz7.
- In July 2021, the Menedzserek Országos Szövetsége awarded her the Manager of the Year 2020 Award.
- In 2024, she received a certificate of appreciation from Zoltán Maruzsa, Minister of State for Education and Eszter Hergár, Chair of the Board of Trustees of the Pénziránytű Foundation for his outstanding professional activity and active role in the field of financial literacy and entrepreneurship development over a decade.

== Family ==
Éva Hegedüs lives with her partner, she is the mother of two adult children.

Hegedüs's younger son, Máté Jendrolovics, runs a 200-person development company called Intuitech (aka. GB Solutions Zrt.), of which Gránit Bank is a key partner.
