= Fanny von Hann-Kende =

Hungarian-born American psychoanalyst

- Born: Fanni Kende; April 17, 1891; Budapest, Austria-Hungary
- Died: April 14, 1952 (aged 60); New York City, New York, US
- Occupations: Psychoanalyst, physician, pathologist

Fanny von Hann-Kende (April 17, 1891 — April 14, 1952) was a Hungarian-born American psychoanalyst, on the faculty at Columbia University.

== Early life and education ==
Fanny von Hann was born in Budapest, the daughter of Arnold Hann and Lujza Gold. Her father was a financial officer. She attended the Royal Hungarian University, and earned her medical license in 1914. Later, in the 1920s, she trained as a psychoanalyst in Vienna; she was analysed by Margaret Mahler.

== Career ==
From 1914 to 1920, von Hann was a professor of pathology at the Royal Hungarian University. From 1932 to 1938 she was on the faculty at the Budapest School of Psychoanalysis, where she worked with Sándor Ferenczi and developed an abbreviated psychoanalytic therapy. She wrote about psychosexual development, complicating the Freudian understanding of the clitoris and of penis envy.

She moved to the United States in 1938, and worked at the New York Psychoanalytic Institute, part of Columbia-Presbyterian Medical Center. She was a member of the American Medical Association and other professional organizations.

== Personal life ==
Fanny von Hann married a fellow physician, Béla Kende, in Budapest in 1920. They had a daughter, Mária Lujza Kende. Fanny von Hann-Kende became a United States citizen in 1944, and died in New York City in 1952, from colon cancer, shortly before her 61st birthday.
