= Rajk College for Advanced Studies =

Coordinates: 47.4924°N 19.0679°E

- Rajk Szakkollégium
- Budapest; Hungary

Information
- Type: Private college
- Established: 1970; 56 years ago
- Educational authority: Corvinus University of Budapest
- President: Prof. Dr. Attila Chikán
- Head Principal: Anita Kaderják
- Vice-Principal: Márton Kövesdy, Dániel Horn
- Affiliations: Corvinus University of Budapest, Eötvös Loránd University - EucA
- Alumni: ~1000
- Website: http://rajk.eu

Rajk College for Advanced Studies (Hungarian: Rajk Szakkollégium) is an educational institution offering advanced courses in the fields of economics, business and social sciences. The college is a self governing community of about 100 selected students living together. It was founded in 1970 by the students of the Corvinus University of Budapest (then Karl Marx University of Economic Sciences), with Attila Chikán as its first principal. It is the oldest existing institution of the kind in Hungary, giving a model to a number of later colleges in Hungary and abroad, such as the Bibó István College for Advanced Studies in Hungary or the Mikó Imre College for Advanced Studies in Romania. The college was named in 1974 after László Rajk, a leading Hungarian Communist, who was proclaimed an enemy of the regime and executed in a show trial in 1949. The idea behind the naming of the college was to express criticism towards the system at the time. In December 2018, the college dropped László from its name.

The college played an active political role during the time of the communist regime. In the 1980s, it served as a base for the opposition and organized several political fora and assisted political movements such as Fidesz, contributing to the transformation of Hungary to a democratic country with a market economy. After the transition the college abandoned institutional politics, however it expects its members to be active in the civil society.

== Functioning of the college ==
The main power of the college is the Assembly in which every member has the right to vote. It meets three or four times a semester. For day to day matters there is an annually elected Student Board that has regular meetings every week. Its members are the principal, the senior advisor, the chairman of the Student Board and six other students elected by the Assembly every February. The Committee for Academic Activities is responsible for the education and research activities. It organizes and supervises the courses and promotes academic publications. There are several further institutions which are responsible for organizing the college's operation in different fields

Financing of the college is based on a number of sources. Various foundations, governmental and business institutions give their support based on occasional applications. The respective universities pay a nominal fee after each of their students who become members of the college. The members are also required to pay a certain amount decided by the Assembly. Contributions from the alumni also play an important role.

== Professional activities of the college ==
The college invites professors to give courses on various subjects in economics, econometrics, economic and public policy, finance, monetary policy, business, management, sociology, political science, international relations and other related fields. These are usually two semester courses and the attendees of each course have to give account of their professional work at the end of every single semester.

Evening lectures are organized once or twice every week. These cover a wide range of topics, mostly contemporary issues in economics and social sciences or relevant global or Hungarian problems. A large proportion of prominent personalities of Hungarian economic and business life, both academics and decision-makers, regularly give lectures at the college.

Many of the college graduates continue their studies for PhD, MA, or MBA at American and Western European universities, recently at Harvard, Stanford, MIT, Oxford, LSE or Barcelona.

Rajk College organizes several conferences each year. These are about topical issues, varying from economic theory questions to current social problems of Hungary and Europe. In every two years an international student conference is organized on Central European issues called CEC (Central European Conference), inviting students and teachers from all over Europe. The college organizes the 11th CEC in 2017 with the main title ”The Future of the Western World”.

== John von Neumann Award and the Herbert Simon Award ==
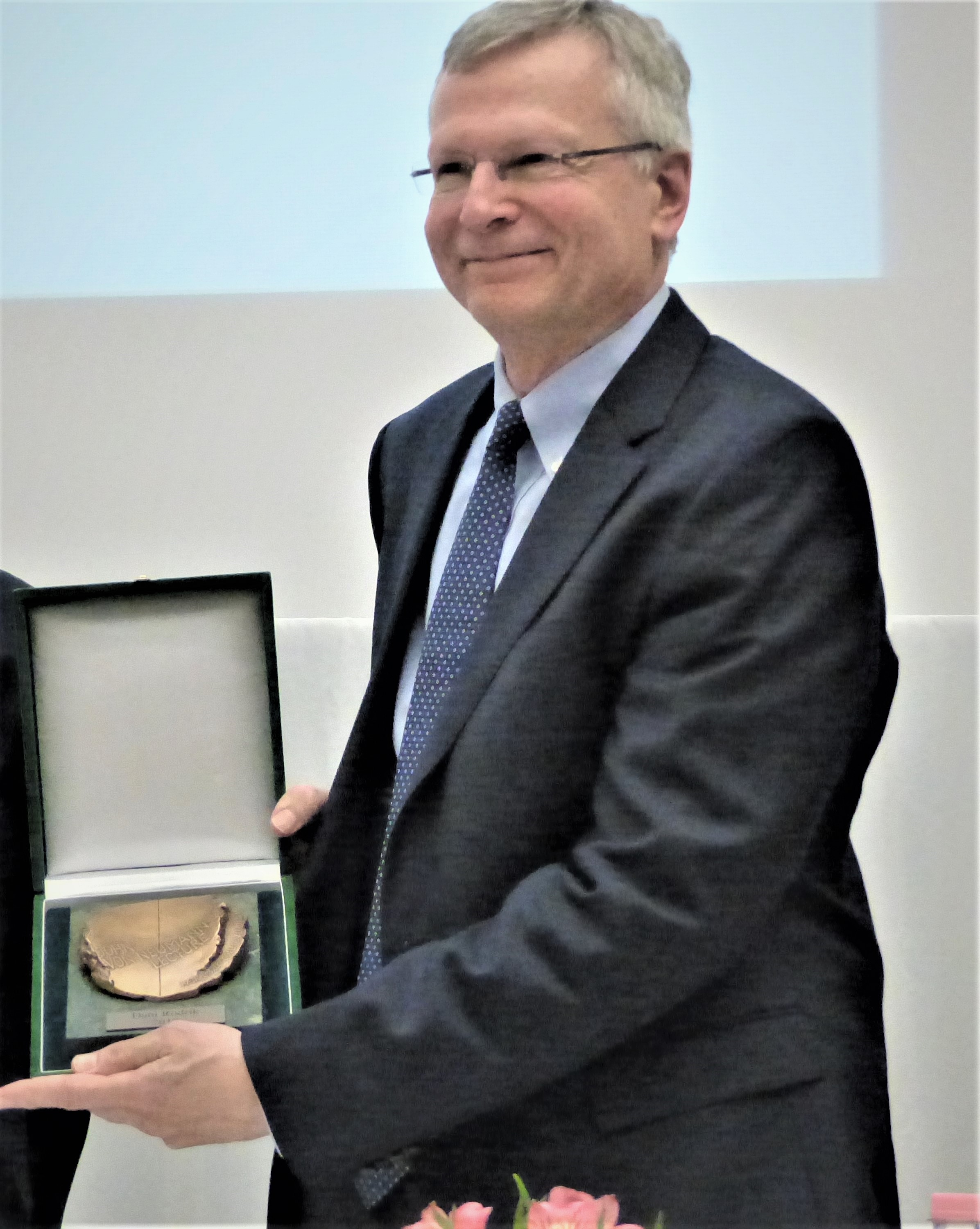
Dani Rodrik - John von Neumann Award

The John von Neumann Award was established in 1994. It is given annually to an outstanding scholar in exact social sciences whose works have had substantial influence over a long period of time on the studies and intellectual activity of the students of the college. Recipients are invited to the college to receive the award, give an open lecture and hold a master class.

The Herbert Simon Award was established in 2004 with similar philosophy but for a different area. It is given to scholars whose scientific achievements have helped with the understanding or solving of practical business problems and inspired the students of the college.

These awards are distinguished from other scientific awards on the basis that these are given by students who select the nominees and vote for the prize-winner in the Assembly after a thorough review and debate process.

== See also ==
- Corvinus University of Budapest
- Eötvös Loránd University
- Central European University
- College for Advanced Studies in Social Theory
- Széchenyi István College for Advanced Studies
- John von Neumann Award
