= Dávid Korányi =

Hungarian diplomat

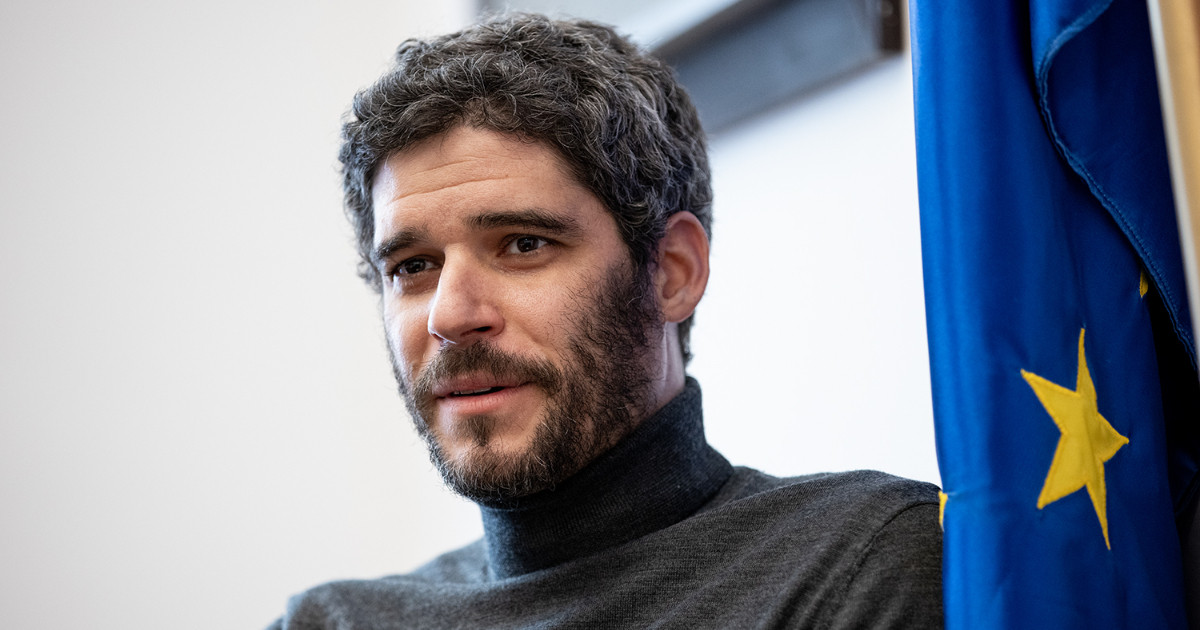
Dávid Korányi

Dávid Korányi is a chief advisor of city diplomacy for Gergely Karácsony, the mayor of Budapest. Prior to that he was a director of the Atlantic Council's Eurasian Energy Futures Initiative and deputy director of the Atlantic Council's Dinu Patriciu Eurasia Center. In 2009 he was undersecretary of state, chief foreign policy, and national security advisor to the Prime Minister of the Republic of Hungary, Gordon Bajnai. He was a member of the Hungarian NATO Strategic Concept Special Advisory Group.

== Education and fellowships ==
Mr. Korányi obtained his master's degree in international relations and economics, with a major in foreign affairs from Corvinus University of Budapest.

He has been a nonresident fellow at the Johns Hopkins University SAIS Center for Transatlantic Relations since 2010. In 2010, he was the recipient of the German Marshall Fund's Marshall Memorial Fellowship. The following year he became a Marshall Memorial Fellow Selection Board Member. In 2012, he received the French Foreign Ministry's Personalities of the Future Fellowship.

== Career ==
In Budapest, he worked at the Hungarian National Assembly as a political adviser. He was then at GKI Economic Research Institute as a junior researcher. He worked in the European Parliament as foreign policy advisor and cabinet of a Hungarian MEP beginning in 2004. Then, in 2009, he was a member of the Hungarian NATO Strategic Concept Special Advisory Group, and until 2010 served as undersecretary of state and chief foreign policy and national security advisor to the Prime Minister of the Republic of Hungary, Gordon Bajnai. He is director of the Atlantic Council's Eurasian Energy Futures Initiative.

Koranyi is the editor of a book Transatlantic Energy Futures- Strategic Perspectives on Energy Security, Climate Change and New Technologies in Europe and the United States published in December 2011 by Johns Hopkins SAIS Center for Transatlantic Relations and "A Eurasian Primer: The Transatlantic Perspective, a study book published in November 2013 by the Atlantic Council.

Korányi is a member of the European Council on Foreign Relations and the Hungarian Europe Society.

== Personal life ==
In March 2021, he married Enikő Mihalik, a Hungarian model with international career. They had a daughter in July, 2021.

== Sources ==
- Dávid Korányi's profile on the official site of the Hungarian Public Administration.
- Dávid Korányi's profile on the Atlantic Council website.
