= Corvinus Journal of Sociology and Social Policy =

- Discipline: Social Sciences
- Language: English
- Edited by: Márton Medgyesi

Publication details
- History: 2010-present
- Publisher: Corvinus University of Budapest (Hungary)
- Frequency: Biannual
- Open access: Yes

Standard abbreviations
- ISO 4: Corvinus J. Sociol. Soc. Policy

Indexing
- ISSN: 2062-087X
- OCLC no.: 780831885

Links
- Journal homepage; Online access; Online archive

The Corvinus Journal of Sociology and Social Policy is a biannual peer-reviewed academic journal covering research in the social sciences. It was established in 2010 and is published by the Corvinus University of Budapest. The editor-in-chief is Márton Medgyesi(Corvinus University of Budapest).

== Abstracting and indexing ==
The journal is abstracted and indexed by the Emerging Sources Citation Index, the International Bibliography of the Social Sciences, and Scopus.

== See also ==
- List of sociology journals
- List of political science journals
- List of international relations journals
- List of economics journals
