= Erzsébet Nováky =

Hungarian economist

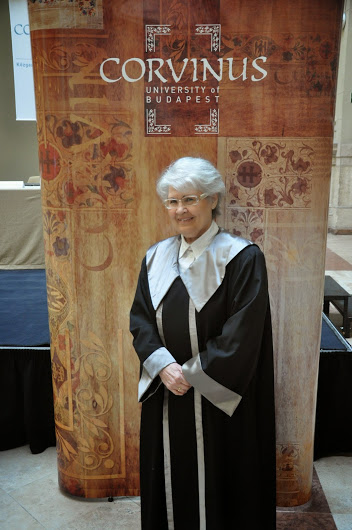
- Born: 20 October 1945 (age 81); Keszthely, Hungary
- Citizenship: Hungarian
- Spouse: István Kappéter (2004)

Academic background
- Education: Karl Marx University of Economic Sciences (1963-1967)
- Influences: Géza Kovács, Mihály Simai, Ernő Zalai

Academic work
- Institutions: Karl Marx University of Economic Sciences Forecasting
- Awards: Széchenyi Professorial Fellowship 1998-2001
- Website: Information at IDEAS / RePEc

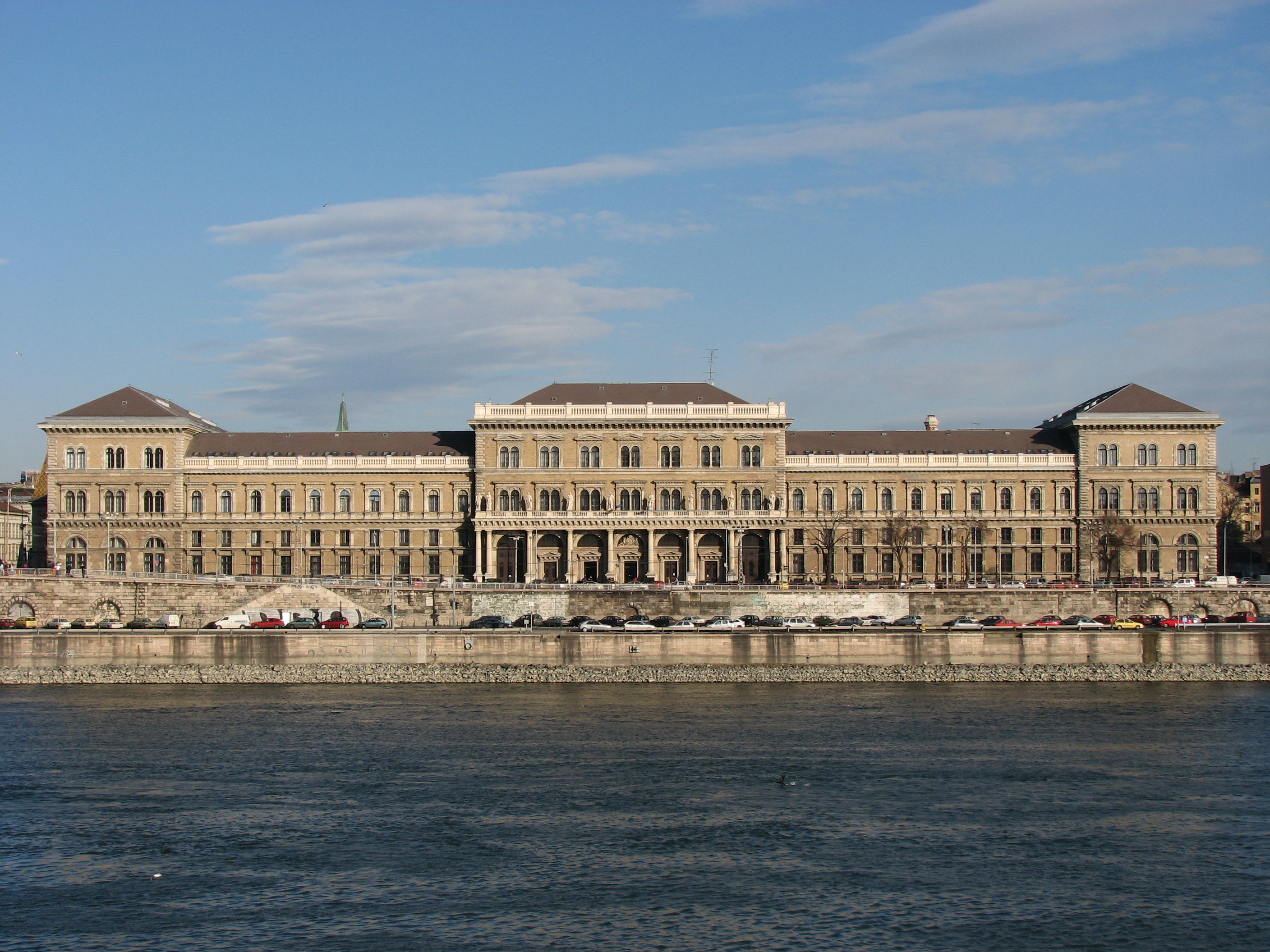
Corvinus University of Budapest, Erzsébet Nováky has been teaching at the University since 1970.

Erzsébet Nováky (Keszthely, 1945 October 20. –) 2005. Academic Award. Erzsébet Nováky, Doctor of Economics, Professor, dedicated futurist since 1970, Head of the Department of Futures Research at the University of Economics 1992-2012. Corvinus University of Budapest, professor emeritus (2015).

== Early life and career ==
Parents: Her father Dr. Jenő Nováky M.Sc. mechanical engineer, economic engineer and doctor of economics, Her mother Erzsébet Cserpes M.Sc. teacher. Her spouse since 2004 has been Dr. István Kappéter (1931-2021), a special education teacher, psychology teacher, neurologist, and psychotherapist. She graduated at the Károly Marx University of Economics (MKKE), where she obtained a degree in economics-mathematics in 1970. After graduating, at the invitation of Géza Kovács, head of the department, she remained at the university and became a lecturer at the Department of Economic Planning. She was climbing the teaching career ladder and in 1989, she was appointed Deputy Director of the Institute of Macro-Planning and Modeling, and professor in 1991. Between 1992-2012 she is head of Department of Futures Reseeach. Between 1996 and 2006, in addition to leading the department, she also led the MTA-BKÁE / BCE Complex Futures Research Research Group, providing development opportunities for young researchers. She is currently Professor emeritus at the Corvinus University of Budapest Institute of International, Political and Regional Studies, Department of Geography, Geoeconomy and Sustainable Development.

She defended her doctoral dissertation in economics in 1980 and then her academic doctoral dissertation in 1991. Between 2005-2011, and 2014-2017 chairman of the Scientific Committee for Futures Research within the section of the Hungarian Academy of Sciences (MTA). In 2003, 2006, and 2009, she was recommended for academic correspondence membership. Between 2013-2016 the chairman of the Doctoral Council of the University. Between 2013-2016 she was a member of the National Doctoral Council, and in 2014-2015 was its vice-president.

== Scientific Work ==
Her research interests include futures research, the methodology of complex socio-economic forecasting, the reliability of forecasts, future orientation, the socio-economic future of Hungary and responsibility for the future. She further developed and was the first to apply the cross-impact method in Hungary. In her academic doctoral dissertation, she demonstrated using a multidisciplinary model that economic and environmental strategies support each other only under certain conditions. She and her colleagues interpreted the concept of future orientation and made an attempt to measure it based on empirical studies. She studied the behavior of complex dynamic systems and recognized the futures significance of chaos theory. She studied the chaotic behavior of Hungarian macro-processes with fellow researchers. She developed a methodology formulating “acceptable” future alternatives for socio-economic development. When outlining the socio-economic situation of Hungary in 2025, She developed complex scenarios and future alternatives, applying the principles of complexity, participativeness and alternativity. The list of scientific papers includes 101 scientific articles (including 18 articles in foreign journals, 7 Web of Science publications), 62 books (including 12 textbooks, monographs, 29 edited books), 89 book chapters, and 57 conference papers, for a total of 430 scientific papers. The number of independent references exceeds 600 (of which 168 are in foreign languages). See the List of Hungarian Scientific Works, as of March 15, 2020.

Organized three Hungarian jubilee futures research conferences in 2006, 2008 and in 2018, the latest on the occasion of the 50th anniversary of the teaching of institutional Hungarian futures research and university-level futures research. Between 1999 and 2005, she organized four international futures research summer universities. In 2005, the Department of Futures Research/Studies hosted the World Futures Studies Federation 19. World Conference.

== Society memberships ==
- 1989–1991 Budapest University of Economics University Council, member
- 1991–1995 OTKA Futures Research Jury, Chairman
- 1996–1998 and 2006–2008 OTKA College of Social Sciences, member
- 2009– Corvinus University of Budapest Doctoral School of Economic Informatics, Core member, Head of Futures Research sub-program
- 1997–2005 World Futures Studies Federation, Executive Board, member
- 1998–2005 Journal of Futures Studies, Editorial Board, member
- 2001–2010 Finland Futures Academy, International Advisory Board, member
- 2004–2006 Leading Futurists in Europe (European Futurist Conference Lucerne) Advisory Board, Vice President
- 2008–2015 Hungarian Organization of the Club of Rome, Vice President
- 2013– Millennium Project Hungary Node, chairman
- 2013– European Journal of Futures Research, Academic Board, member

== Subjects taught ==
- Futures Research, 1975-2008 and 2009-2015
- Socio-economic forecasting (with Éva Hideg co-teacher), 1993-2013
- Social and economic forecasts (with Éva Hideg co-teacher), 2008-2013
- Economic forecasting, 1996-2014
- Environmental modeling, 2003-2008
- Spatial and environmental forecasting methods (with Attila Korompai co-teacher), 2009-2014
- Research Methodology of Social Sciences (with Ildikó, Hrubos, co-teacher), 2001-2011
- Future orientation of economic actors (with Éva Hideg co-teacher), 2010-2015
- Portrait of a scientist, 2014-

== Notable works ==
- Future Research Methods (in Hungarian); 1977
- Practice of Future Research and Forecasting (with co-authors Lajos Besenyei and Erzsébet Gidai), (in Hungarian); 1977
- Forecasting - Reliability - Reality (with co-authors Lajos Besenyei and Erzsébet Gidai) (in Hungarian); 1982
- Futures research (editor and with co-authors Éva Hideg, Attila Korompai, Géza Kovács) (in Hungarian); 1992
- Chaos and Futures Studies (research leader and creative ed.) (in Hungarian); 1995
- Vocational training and future (with co - author Éva Hideg) (in Hungarian); 1998
- Hungary after tomorrow (research leader and creative editor) (in Hungarian); 2001
- Futures Studies in the European Ex-Socialist Countries (with co-authors Mária Kőszeginé Kalas and Viorica Ramba-Varga) 2001
- Change and future (research leader and creative ed.) (in Hungarian); 2008
- Hungary 2025 (research leader and creative editor) 2010
- A method for the analysis of interrelationships between mutually connected events: A cross-impact method (Lóránt Károly with co-author ) Technological Forecasting and Social Change, 1978
- Future orientation in Hungarian society (Hideg Éva and Kappéter István with co-authors ) Futures, 1994
- Chaotic behavior of economic and social macro indicators in Hungary (Hideg Éva and Gáspár-Vér Katalin with co-authors) Journal of Futures Studies, 1997
- Permanent development of futures research methodology, American Behavioral Scientist, 1998
- Dilemmas for renewal of futures methodology (Gáspár Tamás with co-author) Futures, 2002
- Action oriented futures studies in Hungary, Futures, 2006
- Responsibility for the future, Journal of Futures Studies, 2007
- Changing attitudes to the future in Hungary (Hideg Éva with co-author ) Futures, 2010
- The responsibility of futurists in strategic foresight – Hungarian examples (Tyukodi Gergely with co-author) Technological Forecasting and Social Change, 2010
- Discovering our futures – a Hungarian Example (Várnagy Réka with co-author ) Futures, 2013
- Chaos theory and socio-economic renewal in Hungary (Orosz Miklós with co-author) Journal of Futures Studies, 2015
- Studies of Erzsébet Nováky: Web of Science 7Studies

== Recognition ==
- 1975 Ministerial Praise, Minister of Education
- 1978 Publisher Award (For Practice of Future Research and Forecasting) Economics and Law Publishing House
- 1979 Award for Outstanding Work, Minister of Education
- 1986 Researcher Award (for the book Razvityije tyehnologii v obucsényii) MTA
- 1998 Széchenyi Professorial Scholarship (1998 - 2001) Ministry of Education
- 1999 Master Teacher Award, National Scientific Student Council (OTDT), Ministry of Education, MTA
- 2000 Arnold Ipolyi - prize ("Science Development Prize") National Scientific Research Fund (OTKA)
- 2005 Academic Award MTA
- 2005 Albert Szent-Györgyi Prize, Ministry of Education
- 2009 “For the Hungarian Scientific Futures Research” commemorative plaque, Hungarian Academy of Sciences IX. Section of Futures Research Committee
- 2012 Officer's Cross of the Hungarian Order of Merit, President of the Republic of Hungary
- 2012 BCE „Közgáz” Campus Scientific Student Master Teacher” Student Science Department
- 2015 Corvinus University of Budapest Gold medal
- 2015 WFSF President’s Outstanding Woman Futurist Award

== Sources ==
- Hungarian Who's Who 1990, Biographer, Láng Texoft Publishing House, Budapest, 431
- The Futures Research Directory: Individuals, 1991-92. Compiled and Edited by the World Future Society. World Future Society, Bethesda, Maryland, USA, 1991, 140
- Kjell Dahle: On Alternative Ways of Studying the Future. International Institutions, an Annotated Bibliography and a Norwegian Case. The Alternative Future Project, Oslo, 1991, 78
- Hungarian and international who is who 1992, Biographer, Budapest, 648
- The Futures Research Directory: Organizations and Periodicals, 1993-94. Compiled and edited by the World Future Society. World Future Society, Bethesda, Maryland, USA, 1993, 30 and 112
- Hungarian and international who's who 1994, Biographer, Budapest, 699
- The Futures Research Directory: Individuals, 1995-96. Compiled and edited by the World Future Society. World Future Society, Bethesda, Maryland, USA, 1995, 139-140
- Hungarian and international who is who 1996, Biographer, Budapest, 723
- New York Academy of Sciences. Directory of Members. Bernard C. Harris Publishing Company, Inc. 1996, 327
- Hungarian and International Who's Who 1998, Biographer, Budapest, 773
- MARQUIS Who’s Who in the World 15th Edition, New Providence, 1998, 1029
- International Who’s Who of Professional and Business Women, Sixth Edition 1999. American Biographical Institute, Inc., 204
- Almanac. Pro Scientia Gold Medalists and Master Teachers. 1999. National Scientific Student Council, Budapest, 1999, 114 and 161
- The Futurist Directory. A Guide to Individuals Who Write, Speak, or Consult about the Future. Millennium Edition. Compiled and edited by the World Future Society. World Future Society, Bethesda, Maryland, USA, 2000, 254
- Who is who. Researchers of the Hungarian Academy of Sciences. 2000. Institute of Research Organization of the Hungarian Academy of Sciences, Budapest, 141
- Who is Who 2000 2 volumes, Greger-Biográf, Budapest, 1200
- Who is who in the Hungarian economy. Humexim Kft. Budapest, 2001, 237-238
- MARQUIS Who’s Who in the World 19th Edition, New Providence, 2002, 1586
- Biographer Who's Who 2002, Poligráf Publishing House, Budapest, 1321
- Biographer Who's Who 2004, L-Z volume, Poligráf Publishing House, Budapest, 1196
- Who Is Who in Hungary. Biographical encyclopedia of leading personalities of Hungary. 3rd edition. Hübners Who is Who, Switzerland, 2005, 1395
- Révai New Lexicon, XV. volume Nem-Rab, Babits Publishing House, Szekszárd, 2005, 185
- MTI who is who L-Z, 2006, MTI, Budapest, 1269
- Who is who in Hungarian education. II. volume. Higher education, adult education, vocational training and language schools. FISZ Admission Information Service, DFT Hungária Kft. 2006, 404-405
- MTI Who is who, 2009. Biographical lexicon of our contemporaries (editor-in-chief: Péter Hermann), MTI Budapest, 2008, 814
- Members of the Public Body of the Hungarian Academy of Sciences, 2009. (ed. Márton Tolnai). IX. Department of Economics and Law. Representatives of the non-academic general assembly of the department, Institute for Research Organization of the Hungarian Academy of Sciences, Budapest, 422
- Women in Science (ed. Margit Balogh, Mária Palasik) Napvilág Publishing House, Budapest, 2010, 506-507
- József Berács, Erzsébet Malota, Boglárka Zsótér: The Process of the Internationalization of Hungarian Higher Education 2. Bologna Booklets 8. Corvinus University of Budapest, Budapest, 2010, 103
- Who Is Who in Hungary. Biographical encyclopedia of leading personalities of Hungary. 11th edition. Hübners Who is Who, Switzerland, 2013, 1868–69
- Britishpedia. Successful personalities of Hungary. I. 2017. A BPH - British Publishing House Publication House, British Publishing House LTD. 2017, 402
- National Doctoral Council (ODT) Erzsébet Nováky personal data sheet
- Erzsébet Nováky, Member of the Public Body of the Hungarian Academy of Sciences
- Corvinus University of Budapest. Erzsébet Nováky
- National Doctoral Council (ODT) Nováky Erzsébet personal data sheet.
- Nováky Erzsébet, Member of the Public Body of the Hungarian Academy of Sciences
- Corvinus University of Budapest. Nováky Erzsébet
