= John von Neumann Award =

Hungarian award in the exact social sciences

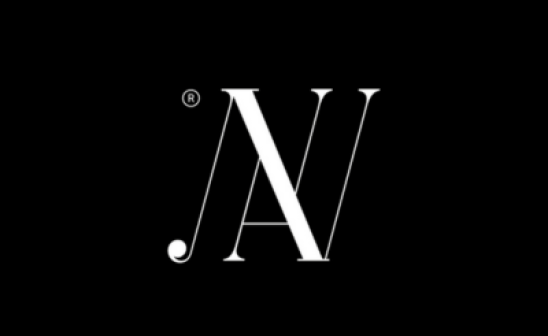
- Awarded for: Influential contributions to research in exact social sciences, effect on research directions of the College.
- Country: Hungary
- Presented by: Rajk College for Advanced Studies
- First award: 1995
- Website: rajk.eu/neumann-award/

The John von Neumann Award (Hungarian: Neumann János-díj), named after John von Neumann, is given annually by the Rajk College for Advanced Studies in Budapest, to an outstanding scholar in the exact social sciences, whose works have had substantial influence over a long period of time on the studies and intellectual activity of the students of the college. The award was established in 1994 and is given annually. In 2013, separately from the annual prize, Kenneth J. Arrow was given the Honorary John von Neumann Award.

This award differentiates itself from other scientific awards on the basis that it is given by students of economics and various social sciences, decided after a long deliberation process. The students select the nominees and vote for the prize-winner in the Assembly of the College after a review and debate regarding the pre-selected names.

Most of the recipients of the award have been academics working in some branch of economics - an exception is the philosopher and political theorist Jon Elster. Multiple recipients, such as Jean Tirole, Esther Duflo, and Joshua Angrist were subsequently awarded the Nobel Prize in Economics. Others like Gary Becker and John Harsanyi received the award after they were awarded the Nobel Prize in Economics. Kenneth J. Arrow also received the Honorary John von Neumann Award in 2013 after being awarded the Nobel Prize in 1972.

Overall eleven recipients have received the Nobel Prize in Economics, eight after getting the Neumann-award (Tirole, Williamson, Acemoglu, Aghion, Angrist, Duflo, Thaler), and four beforehand (Harsányi, Becker, Arrow, Roth).

== Recipients ==
Year	Recipient	Institution	Nationality	Field/Contribution
1995	John Harsanyi	UC Berkeley	Hungary; United States	
1996	Hal Varian	University of Michigan	United States	
1997	János Kornai	Harvard University; Collegium Budapest	Hungary	
1998	Jean Tirole	Toulouse School of Economics	France	
1999	Oliver E. Williamson	UC Berkeley	United States	
2001	Avinash K. Dixit	Princeton University	India; United States	
2002	Jon Elster	Columbia University	Norway	
2003	Maurice Obstfeld	UC Berkeley	United States	
2004	Gary Becker	University of Chicago	United States	
2005	Glenn Loury	Brown University	United States	
2006	Matthew Rabin	UC Berkeley	United States	
2007	Daron Acemoglu	MIT	Turkey; United States	
2008	Kevin M. Murphy	University of Chicago	United States	
2009	Philippe Aghion	Harvard University	France	
2010	Tim Besley	London School of Economics	United Kingdom	
2011	Joshua Angrist	MIT	United States	
2012	Olivier Blanchard	MIT	France	
2013	Esther Duflo	MIT	France; United States	
2013	Kenneth J. Arrow*	Stanford University	United States	
2014	Emmanuel Saez	UC Berkeley	France; United States	
2015	Matthew O. Jackson	Stanford University	United States	
2016	Alvin E. Roth	Stanford University	United States	
2017	Richard H. Thaler	University of Chicago	United States	
2018	Dani Rodrik	Harvard University	Turkey; United States	
2019	Susan Athey	Stanford University	United States	
2020	Mariana Mazzucato	University College London	Italy; United States	
2021	Matthew Gentzkow	Stanford University	United States	
2022	John A. List	University of Chicago	United States	
2023	Raj Chetty	Harvard University	India; United States	
2024	Guido Tabellini	Bocconi University	Italy	
2025	Edward Glaeser	Harvard University	United States	

*Received honorary prize.

== See also ==
- List of social sciences awards
- List of economics awards
- Prizes named after people
- John Bates Clark Medal
- Yrjö Jahnsson Award
- Nakahara Prize
- Gossen Prize

== Bibliography ==
- Sen, Syamal K.; Agarwal, Ravi P. (2014). Creators of mathematical and computational sciences. Cham: Springer. p. 399. ISBN 9783319108704.
- Colin, Read (2012). The Portfolio Theorists. Basingstoke: Palgrave Macmillan UK. p. 67. ISBN 978-0-230-36230-7.
