= College for Advanced Studies in Social Theory =

Coordinates: 47°29′01″N 19°03′54″E

The College for Advanced Studies in Social Theory (Hungarian: Társadalomelméleti Kollégium, TEK) is the oldest independent college of leftist-intellectual orientation at Corvinus University of Budapest as well as in Hungary.

== History ==
TEK is the second oldest, still operating, advanced studies college in Hungary. It was founded in 1981 by young researchers and students.

TEK seceded from the first established college in Hungary, the Rajk László College for Advanced Studies. During the Cold War, the college's main topic was the reinterpretation of Marx's ouvre. It expanded to other areas after the Cold War ended.

== Philosophical principles ==
TEK uses a critical approach to the economical theories that Corvinus University has in its educational program, including focus on social inequalities in human resources, structuralism, neoliberalism, functionalism, and corporatism.

TEK is also involved in green politics, which includes critical mass, gay pride, many flashmobs, that are held in support of promoting a livable environment. Among the members of TEK are also permanent supporters of the anti-g8 anti-g20 demonstrations.

TEK started a lifestyle experiment by establishing an annual commune, in which the members apply voluntarily. In these communities the members share all goods and live together in one place.

TEK is more of a theoretical college, putting theoretical approaches to the questions of the society in front of bare statistical analysis, processing of data.

Members of TEK often individually participate in community service, including organizing conferences on behalf of the homeless, voluntary work promoting the reintegration of Romani people into the labour market, and promoting education in less developed areas.

== Vocational work ==
The base of the vocational work in TEK are the annual or semi-annual tutorials. The topics of these tutorials are given by the members of the college, which are to be held by the tutors after compiling a schedule. The participants analyse, discuss the literature together with the tutor. At the end of every tutorial, the participants write an essay. The main frame for the tutorials are based on political economy, economics of globalization, Frankfurt School, green and ethical economics, and postmodern sociology.

Fordulat (meaning "pivot" or "revolution") is the official periodical of the college.
