= Amy Edmondson =

American academic

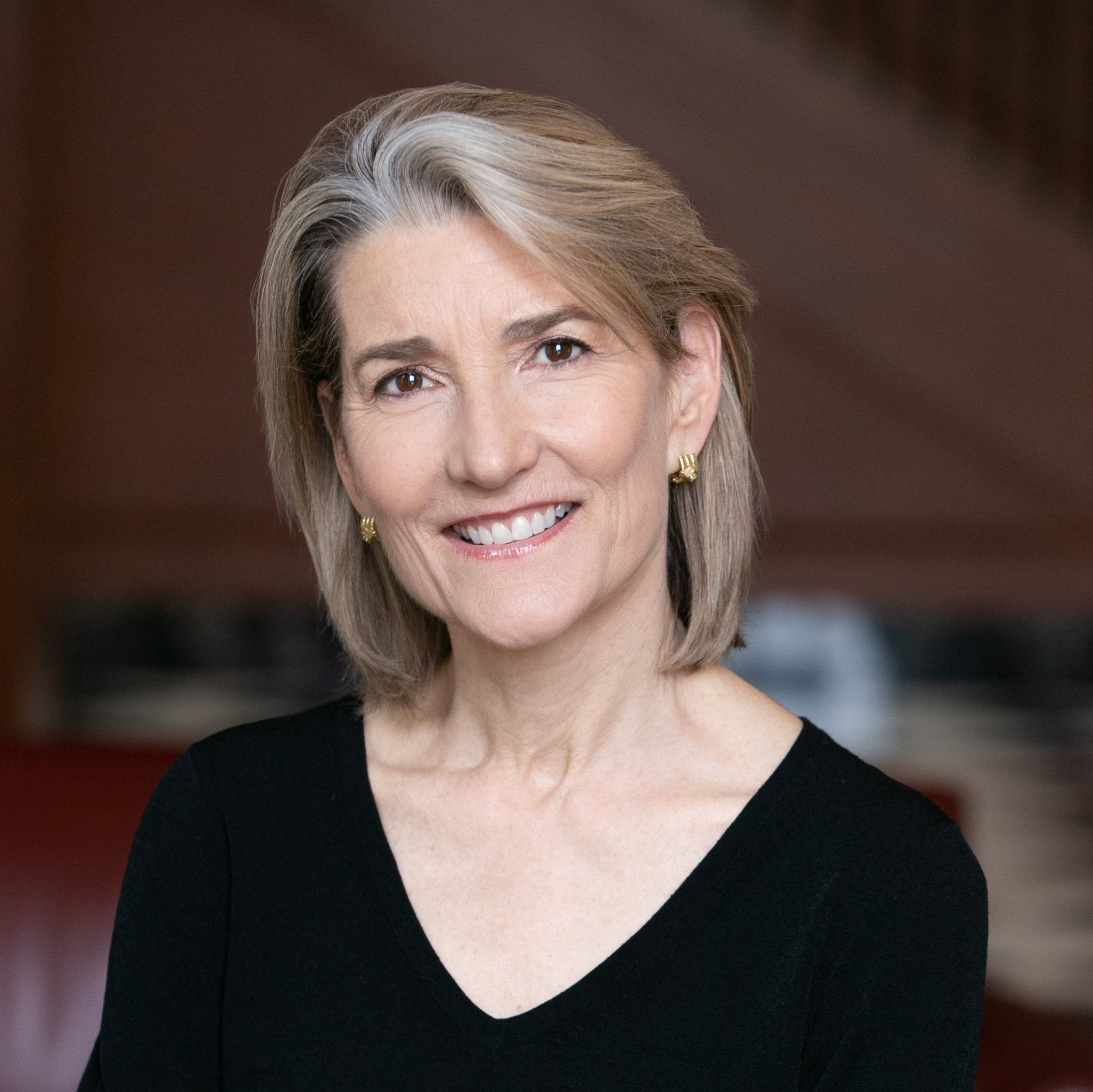
- Born: Amy C. Edmondson
- Known for: Psychological safety, Team learning, Organizational learning, Intelligent failure
- Spouse: George Q. Daley
- Awards: Fellow of the American Academy of Arts and Sciences (2024); Fellow of the Academy of Management (2023); Financial Times Business Book of the Year Award (2023); Herbert Simon Award (2022)

Academic background
- Education: Harvard University (BA, MA, PhD)
- Thesis: Group and organizational influences on team learning (1996)

Amy Claire Edmondson is an American scholar of leadership, teaming, and organizational learning. She is the Novartis Professor of Leadership at Harvard Business School. Edmondson is the author of seven books and more than 75 articles and case studies. She is best known for her pioneering work on psychological safety, which has helped spawn a large body of academic research in management, healthcare and education over the past 15 years. Her books include "Right Kind of Wrong, the Science of Failing Well" (September 5, 2023), “The Fearless Organization, Creating Psychological Safety in the Workplace for Learning, Innovation, and Growth” (2018)) and “Teaming: How Organizations Learn, Innovate and Compete in the Knowledge Economy” (2012).

== Education ==
Edmondson earned her A.B. in Visual and Environmental Studies and Engineering Sciences from Harvard University in 1980. She subsequently completed an A.M. in Psychology in 1995 and a Ph.D. in Organizational Behavior in 1996, also at Harvard University.

== Career ==
After completing her doctorate, Edmondson joined the faculty at Harvard Business School in 1996 as an Assistant Professor. She was promoted to Associate Professor in 2001, Full Professor in 2004, and was appointed the Novartis Professor of Leadership and Management in 2006.

Before joining Harvard, she was Director of Research at Pecos River Learning Centers, where she worked on transformational change in large companies. She also worked as Chief Engineer for architect/inventor Buckminster Fuller.

Edmondson studies teaming, psychological safety, and organizational learning, and her articles have been published numerous academic and management outlets, including Administrative Science Quarterly, Academy of Management Journal, Harvard Business Review and California Management Review.

She has been ranked by the biannual Thinkers50 global list of top management thinkers since 2011 (most recently number 1 in 2023), and selected in 2019 as the number 1 most influential thinker in Human Resources by HR Magazine.

== Awards ==
- 2024: Elected Fellow of the American Academy of Arts and Sciences
- 2024: Teachers College Medal for Distinguished Service, Columbia University
- 2024: Academy of Management Best Healthcare Management Theory to Practice Award for The Frame Matters (with Nembhard and Kerrissey)
- 2023: Financial Times Business Book of the Year Award for The Right Kind of Wrong
- 2023: Elected Fellow of the Academy of Management
- 2022: Herbert Simon Award
- 2019: Distinguished Scholar Award, Organization Development and Change Division, Academy of Management
- 2019: Named the Most Influential International Thinker in Human Resources by HR Magazine
- 2019: Winner of the Thinkers50 Breakthrough Idea Award for The Fearless Organization
- 2019: Ranked #3 on the Thinkers50 list of the world's most influential management thinkers
- 2019: The Fearless Organization named one of the Best International Non-Fiction Books of the Year by the Sharjah International Book Fair
- 2019: The Fearless Organization listed #14 on the Porchlight Business Best Seller list
- 2019: Finalist for the McKinsey Award for the Best Article in Harvard Business Review for “Cross-Silo Leadership” (with Tiziana Casciaro and Sujin Jang)
- 2018: Sumantra Ghoshal Award for Rigour and Relevance in the Study of Management, London Business School
- 2017: OBHR Distinguished Scholar Award, Purdue University
- 2014: Doctorem Honoris Causa, Universiteit Maastricht

== Personal ==
Edmondson married George Q. Daley in 1995.

== Publications ==
=== Books ===
- Edmondson, A. (1987). A Fuller Explanation: The Synergetic Geometry of R. Buckminster Fuller. Birkhäuser Boston, Inc. ISBN 978-0-8176-3338-7
- Edmondson, A. (2012). Teaming: How Organizations Learn, Innovate, and Compete in the Knowledge Economy. John Wiley & Sons. ISBN 978-0-7879-7093-2
- Edmondson, A. (2013). Teaming to Innovate. John Wiley & Sons. ISBN 978-1118856277
- Edmondson, A., & Susan Salter Reynolds. (2016). Building the Future: Big Teaming for Audacious Innovation. Berrett-Koehler Publishers, Inc. ISBN 978-1-62656-419-0
- Edmondson, A., & Jean-François Harvey. (2017). Extreme Teaming: Lessons in Complex, Cross-Sector Leadership. Emerald Publishing Limited. ISBN 978-1786354501
- Edmondson, A. (2018). The Fearless Organization: Creating Psychological Safety in the Workplace for Learning, Innovation, and Growth. John Wiley & Sons. ISBN 978-1119477242
- Edmondson, A. (2023). Right Kind of Wrong: The Science of Failing Well. Atria Books (an imprint of Simon & Schuster). ISBN 9781982195069

=== Selected peer-reviewed articles ===
- Edmondson, A. C. (1999). Psychological safety and learning behavior in work teams. Administrative Science Quarterly, 44(4), 350–383.
- Edmondson, A. C. (2002). The local and variegated nature of learning in organizations. Organization Science, 13(2), 128–146.
- Edmondson, A. C. (2003). Speaking up in the operating room: How team leaders promote learning in interdisciplinary action teams. Journal of Management Studies, 40(6), 1419–1452.
- Nembhard, I. M., & Edmondson, A. C. (2006). Making it safe: The effects of leader inclusiveness and professional status on psychological safety and improvement efforts in health care teams. Journal of Organizational Behavior, 27(7), 941–966.
- Edmondson, A. C., & McManus, S. E. (2007). Methodological fit in management field research. Academy of Management Review, 32(4), 1155–1179.
- Detert, J. R., & Edmondson, A. C. (2011). Implicit voice theories: Taken-for-granted rules of self-censorship at work. Academy of Management Journal, 54(3), 461–488.
- Valentine, M., & Edmondson, A. C. (2015). Team scaffolds: How mesolevel structures enable role-based coordination in temporary groups. Organization Science, 26(2), 405–422.
- Kerrissey, M. J., Mayo, A., & Edmondson, A. C. (2021). Joint problem-solving orientation in fluid cross-boundary teams. Academy of Management Discoveries, 7(3), 381–405.
- Edmondson, A. C., & Bransby, D. (2023). Psychological safety comes of age: Observed themes in an established literature. Annual Review of Organizational Psychology and Organizational Behavior, 10(1), 55–78.
- Harvey, J.-F., Cromwell, J. R., Johnson, K., & Edmondson, A. C. (2023). The dynamics of team learning: Harmony and rhythm in teamwork arrangements for innovation. Administrative Science Quarterly, 68(3), 601–647.
