= Robert M. Grant (economist) =

American economist

Robert Morris Grant (born in Bristol, UK on 23 January 1948) is a scholar and teacher of strategic management. He has held faculty positions at a number of business schools in the UK, Canada, and the US and is currently Professor of Strategic Management at Bocconi University in Milan. He was previously a professor at Georgetown University in Washington, DC (1993-2007).

Grant is best known for his work on the resource-based and knowledge-based views of the firm. His resource-based theory of competitive advantage identifies the characteristics of resources and capabilities that determine their capacity to establish a competitive advantage, sustain a competitive advantage, and appropriate the returns from that competitive advantage. His contributions to the knowledge-based theory of the firm identify knowledge as the most strategically important resource of the firm, and views the firm as an institution for integrating and deploying knowledge. This provides a rationale for the existence of the firm that is distinct from the traditional transaction cost explanation, and offers insights into the internal structure of the firm, its coordination processes, and the role of strategic alliances.

Grant's strategic management textbook, "Contemporary Strategy Analysis", is used in business schools throughout the world. It has been translated into 12 different languages.
