= Tibor Palánkai =

Hungarian economist (1938–2026)

- Born: 1 March 1938
- Died: 9 November 2026 (aged 88)
- Occupations: Economist; university teacher

Tibor Palánkai (1 March 1938 – 9 November 2026) was a Hungarian economist, university teacher and member of the Hungarian Academy of Sciences. He was awarded the Jean Monnet prize and multiple Hungarian awards. He was the vice-rector of the Karl Marx University of Economics between 1977 and 1983 and the rector of Budapest University of Economic Sciences between 1997 and 2000. He was an emeritus professor since 2008.

== Life and work ==
His fields of research included economics, macro-economics, world economics and international integration and European studies. He received the Jean Monnet prize from the European commission for his pioneering role in European integration studies.

One of his focuses was the integration of Hungary into the European Union. He authored multiple books on this topic.

Palánkai published more than 150 scientific publications.

Palánkai died on 9 November 2026, at the age of 88.

== Awards ==
- Hungarian Academy awards (1994)
- Order of Merit of the Hungarian Republic (1998)
- Ferenc Deák research award (1999)
- Gyula Kautz award (2008)
- Szécheny award (2009)
- Jean Monnet prize (2010)
