= Joseph Lutula =

Congolese politician

Minister of Agriculture of the Republic of the Congo
- In office 24 June 1960 – 12 September 1960
- President: Joseph Kasa-Vubu
- Prime Minister: Patrice Lumumba
- In office 2 August 1961 – 17 April 1963
- Prime Minister: Cyrille Adoula

Minister of Minister of Middle Classes and Community Development of the Republic of the Congo
- In office 17 April 1963 – September 1963

Personal details
- Born: 6 October 1927 Usumba-Wembo-Nyama, Katako-Kombe Territory, Belgian Congo
- Died: 17 March 2008 (aged 80) Kinshasa, Democratic Republic of the Congo
- Party: Mouvement National Congolais

Joseph Bonaventure Lutula La Puku Pene Omasumbu (6 October 1927 – 17 March 2008) was a Congolese politician who served as Minister of Agriculture of the Democratic Republic of the Congo (then Republic of the Congo) in 1960. He reassumed the post in 1961 and held it until April 1963, when he was appointed Minister of Middle Classes and Community Development. He resigned from the government that September. He died in 2008.

== Biography ==
Joseph Lutula was born on 6 October 1927 in the village of Usumba-Wembo-Nyama, Katako-Kombe Territory, Belgian Congo to a Tetela family. He was schooled by Methodists alongside Patrice Lumumba. In 1947 he moved to Stanleyville and stayed with Lumumba and Paul Kimbulu. Lutula worked as a clerk in the colonial administration. He served as the secretary of a Protestant Tetela association in Léopoldville. Later, several Tetela syndicates conglomerated into the Groupement Batetela and Lutula was chosen as its secretary. Lutula joined the Mouvement National Congolais (MNC), and after the party split he aligned himself with Lumumba's faction, serving on the central committee. In March 1960 Okito participated in the Akutshu-Anamongo Congress of Lodja, serving as one of the conference's secretaries. The participants resolved to create an Association des Akutshu-Anamongo to assist the MNC in the upcoming general elections in Kasai Province, and Lutula was given control of its permanent secretariat.

Lutula ran on an MNC-Lumumba ticket in the May elections in the Sankuru District. He received 11,917 preferential votes and won a seat in the Chamber of Deputies. He was appointed by Prime Minister Lumumba to serve as Minister of Agriculture in his government of the newly independent Republic of the Congo. Lutula and Lumumba were its only members to come from Sankuru. The government was officially invested by Parliament on 24 June 1960. He was dismissed by President Joseph Kasa-Vubu on 12 September. After Lumumba was killed in Katanga in early February 1961, he accompanied Lumumba's widow, Pauline Opango, as she led a demonstration to the United Nations office in Léopoldville to ask for assistance in recovering his body. Following the execution of numerous Lumumba supporters in Bakwanga over the course of the month, Lutula fled Léopoldville and joined Antoine Gizenga's government in Stanleyville as Minister of Agriculture. After a national political reconciliation in August, Lutula resumed his position in the central government under Prime Minister Cyrille Adoula. On 17 April 1963 Adoula reshuffled his cabinet and made him Minister of Middle Classes and Community Development. He resigned in September.

In the 1970s Lutula moved to Kisangani (formerly Stanleyville), but in the late 1980s he returned to Kinshasa (formerly Léopoldville). He died at 20:00 on 17 March 2008 at the Biamba Marie Mutombo Hospital in Kinshasa following cardiac issues.
