= Iekeliene Stange =

Dutch model

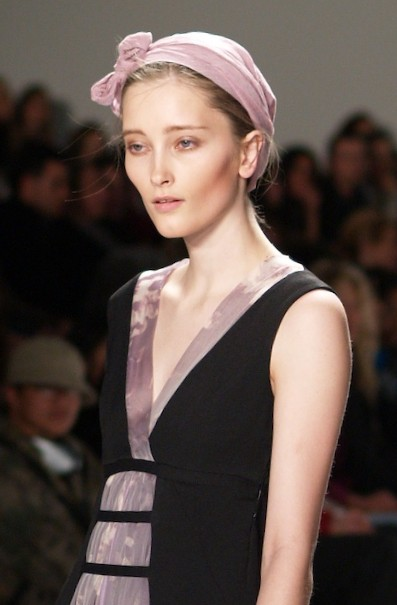
- Stange modeling for Michon Schur, Fall 2006 show, New York Fashion Week, 7 February 2007.
- Born: 27 July 1984 (age 42); Netherlands
- Modeling information
- Height: 5 ft 9.5 in (1.77 m)
- Hair color: Brown
- Eye color: Blue

Iekeliene Stange (Dutch pronunciation: [ˌikəˈlinə ˈstɑŋə]; born 27 July 1984) is a Dutch fashion model and multidisciplinary artist.

Stange is signed with Women Management in Milan and Platform Agency Amsterdam. She has been featured in print advertisements for Marc by Marc Jacobs, Dolce & Gabbana and Sonia Rykiel. She has appeared in runway shows for Chloé, Chanel, Emmanuel Ungaro, Christian Dior, and Kenzo, as well as opening for Marc Jacobs' spring show. Stange famously removed her shoes whilst opening the Marc Jacobs Spring 2007 show due to difficulty walking in them. Stange gave up on trying to maneuver the catwalk in slippery shoes, kicked off her sandals — to much applause — and continued the walk barefoot. It took fifth spot on the "Top Five Runway Falls" list by New York Magazine. Stange's personal style is influenced by Tokyo street fashion. Of her style, she says, "I like crazy, colorful clothes."
