= Pauline Opango =

Congolese activist (1937–2014)

- Born: January 1, 1937; Sankuru District, Belgian Congo
- Died: December 23, 2014 (aged 77); Kinshasa, DR Congo
- Resting place: Nécropole de la Nsele, Kinshasa
- Occupation: Activist
- Spouse: Patrice Lumumba (m. 1951; died 1961)
- Children: 4

Pauline Opango Lumumba (January 1, 1937 – December 23, 2014), also known as Pauline Opangu, was a Congolese activist, and the wife of Patrice Lumumba, the first Prime Minister of the Democratic Republic of Congo. She was born in Wembonyama, Sankuru, Belgian Congo.

Pauline Lumumba was a Congolese activist for independence and women's rights. After marrying Lumumba, a key leader of the anti-colonial political movement, Mouvement National Congolais (MNC), the pair would successfully mobilized various sectors of the Congolese population for independence from Belgium. She is well-known for a heartfelt letter from her late husband that was never delivered to her, and instead transcribed via news outlets. The letter became a poignant symbol of their commitment to Congo's independence.

== Early life ==
Opango was born in Sankura province in the Belgian Congo in 1937. She grew up during the colonial era. During this period, civil unrest, resistance movements, and anti-colonial movements were prevalent. Mine workers and indigenous populations protested for their rights and equity in the legal system, but were often met with extreme brutality.

She married Patrice Lumumba on March 15, 1951, at the age of 14, as arranged by Patrice's brother. After the marriage, she moved to Stanleyville with her husband and sister. She briefly returned to her village to stay with her parents in 1952, for the birth of her first son, Patrice.

== Personal life ==
Pauline Opango was married to Patrice Lumumba until his death in 1961. She was his third wife following Henriette Maletaua (1945–1947) and Hortense Sombosia (1947–1951). Together they had four children, named Patrice, Juliana, Roland and Marie-Christine, although Marie-Christine died shortly after birth in 1960. During their marriage, it was reported that Patrice had extramarital relationships, which was not uncommon for men in the evolue sector. Pauline did try to separate from Patrice due to disagreements, particularly around her role as a traditional wife.

Within a year of his election, Patrice was killed by a firing squad after a coup d'état removed him from power. A 23-year-old Pauline Lumumba watched as her husband was arrested, beaten, and taken away by his murderers. Following Patrice's death, she was threatened by her late husband's enemies. Because of this, Pauline and her children sought safety at a UN camp in Leopoldville. She later moved to Egypt with guarantees of protection under President Gamal Abdel Nasser. From Egypt she traveled to Belgium and France before returning to Congo after the government recognized Patrice Lumumba as a national hero.

Following the death of her husband, she never remarried. She lived her later years in Democratic Republic of Congo. On December 23, 2014, at the age of 77, she died in her sleep in her home in Kinshasa, Congo.

== Activism ==
=== Women's rights ===
Opango was a strong advocate for women's rights in the Congo. Along with other influential feminist figures, she worked tirelessly to challenge the colonial family structure that threatened traditional Congolese families. In Opango's view, the gradual emergence of a new type of family structure among the political class or evolue class posed a threat to role of women – like herself – in the home. Although multiple marriages and divorce were not uncommon in the region, the new political class was adopting a European model that rejected these practices. Opango and other supporters of traditional family values were vocal in their opposition to this shift. She recognized that, historically, men had often married multiple wives, but this practice was becoming less common among the wealthy due to the influence of the new political class and their newfound wealth.

During the colonial era, many Congolese men abandoned polygamous relationships in favor of monogamy. As a result, they would often divorce their wives and marry Europeanized women in order to enhance their social status and political reputation. However, this new trend was met with resistance from women like Opango, who protested against the practice of "changer de femme," or changing wives. She and other feminist activists worked tirelessly with her husband to challenge the new political structure that excluded traditional Congolese women from the political sphere unless they were educated and western. Opango's efforts were aimed at creating a more equitable and just society for all members of her community.

Opango's leadership among women in politics was remarkable as she fearlessly challenged the "Evolué" views on Congolese relationships.

=== Congolese independence ===
The relationship between Patrice Lumumba and Pauline was somewhat unconventional for its time. Patrice helped to found the Mouvement National Congolais and was elected the first prime minister of the independent Republic of Congo in 1960. As Patrice's wife, she was responsible for maintaining domestic responsibilities while he read or worked. During the Congo's struggle for independence, she made significant contributions to the political landscape and strongly advocated for women's rights.

Their marriage during Patrice's rise as a leader in the Congolese independence movement strained their relationship, often separated by Patrice's imprisonment.

=== Acknowledgement for Patrice Lumumba's death ===
On February 14, 1961, Pauline marched through the neighbourhoods of Leopoldville bare-breasted, accompanied by nearly 100 of her late husband's followers, to the United Nations Headquarters. The women's bare-breasted protest (men walked behind with bowed heads) was to protest Patrice Lumumba's death. At the UN HQ Pauline, with Albert Lumumba, Joseph Lutula, and Pauline's young son, whom she carried in her arms, met with Rajeshwar Dayal, a UN representative. As a result of the meeting, the UN agreed to help find her late husband's body, which Pauline wanted to give a Christian burial to in the capital, Léopoldville. Moise Tshombe ultimately refused to return the remains.

== Legacy ==
Patrice Lumumba believed he would be killed, and wrote to Pauline encouraging her to carry on his work after his death. The letter was never sent to her; it was recovered by journalists and Pauline learned about it in news reports.

In 1978, Opango attended a broadcast hosted by the Belgian government where they officially acknowledged their role in the assassination of her husband, Patrice Lumumba, who was the first leader of the newly independent Congo. During an interview with a reporter at the event, Pauline expressed her satisfaction with the acknowledgement. The interviewer went on to summarize Pauline's relationship with her late husband, including her most well-known connection to him – a letter he wrote to her that she has never physically held. Pauline had only seen and read the letter through newspapers and articles, as it was intercepted by a journalist and given to Francois, Lumumba's first son from his first marriage.

In the wake of her loss, Opango mourned in a traditional fashion, leading a procession of mourners while wearing a skirt-style garment and other draped materials. This iconic image of Pauline Lumumba has been immortalized in books and artwork, with renowned artists like Marlene Dumas creating their own interpretations in various mediums and styles. It is a testament to the lasting impact of her story and the power of art to capture the spirit of a person. Further Congolese artists cite Pauline's resistance as an inspiration in their art.
