= Corvinus University of Budapest =

Research university in Budapest, Hungary

Coordinates: 47°29′10″N 19°3′29″E

- Budapesti Corvinus Egyetem
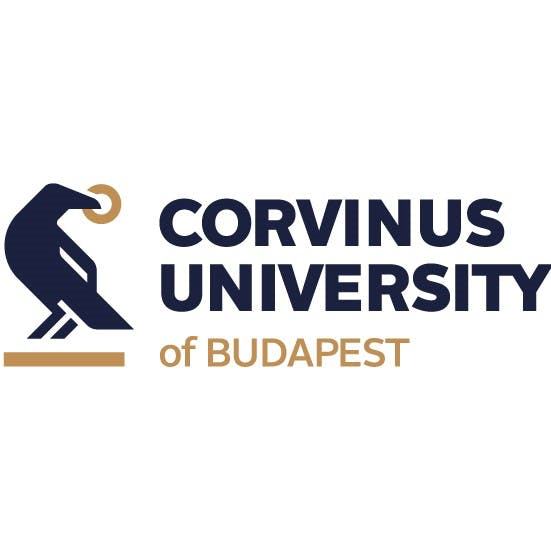
- Motto: Scientia mea – adiutor meus (My knowledge is my helper)
- Type: Public university (managed by Maecenas Universitatis Corvini Foundation)
- Established: 1920
- Affiliations: Professional organisations: AACSB, AFANet, APSA, DRC, EAPAA, EUA, ECLAS, EFMD, ESA, IAU, ICA, IFLA, NISPA, PRME. Professional networks: ECA, CEEMAN, CEMS, EDAMBA, FFNet, LE NOTRE, MIRC, PIM
- Chancellor: Ákos Domahidi
- President: Anthony Radev
- Rector: Bruno van Pottelsberghe
- Administrative staff: 867
- Students: 9,600
- Location: Budapest, Hungary
- Campus: Urban
- Named for: Matthias Corvinus
- Website: www.uni-corvinus.hu

University rankings

Regional – Overall
- QS Emerging Europe and Central Asia: 68 (2022)

Corvinus University of Budapest (Hungarian: Budapesti Corvinus Egyetem) is a private research university in Budapest, Hungary. The university currently has an enrolment of approximately 9,600 students, with a primary focus on business administration, economics, and social sciences, operating in Budapest and Székesfehérvár since 1948. Corvinus University accepts students at six faculties and offer courses leading to degrees at the bachelor, master and doctoral level in specialisations taught in Hungarian, English, French or German.

Corvinus alumni include a former prime minister of Hungary, governors of the Hungarian National Bank as well as various members of the Hungarian political and business elite. Globally, Corvinus is currently ranked in the #1001-1200 range, a drop from the high #801-1000 range from 2022.

== History ==
In 1846, József Industrial School opened its gates with departments for economics and trade for upper grade students. The immediate forerunner of the Corvinus University of Budapest, the Faculty of Economics of the Royal Hungarian University, was established in 1920. The faculty was an independent organization that was granted the same status as faculties of other universities.

In 1934, the faculty was merged with other institutions including the University of Technology to form the Hungarian Royal Palatine Joseph University of Technology and Economics. Modern economist training began in 1948, when the Hungarian University of Economics was established as a separate universitas. Since then, the institution has undergone multiple name changes. In 1953 it was renamed Karl Marx University of Economic Sciences. In 1990, following the end of communism in Hungary the name of the university was changed to the University of Economics of Budapest.

In 2000, with the integration of the College of Public Administration, the institution was named Budapest University of Economic Sciences and Public Administration (BUESPA). The College of Public Administration was founded in 1977.

In 2003, the three faculties of the former University of Horticulture (then part of the Szent István University) were integrated into the BUESPA. The first predecessor of the horticulture faculties, the School for practical Gardening (1853–1860) was the first institution of horticultural professional training in Hungary. The school was founded and managed by the horticultural scholar and publicist Dr Ferenc Entz (1805–1877), who was also a corresponding member of the Hungarian Academy of Sciences. In 1939 an independent Royal Horticultural Academy was launched. It included three departments: agriculture, horticulture and landscape architecture. The latter was one of a kind in Hungary at the time.

In 2004, the university received its present name. The name the Corvinus University of Budapest refers to the name of Corvinae (codices). Bibliotheca Corviniana was one of the most renowned libraries of the Renaissance world, established in the 15th century by King Matthias Corvinus of Hungary.

The Faculty of Public Administration was appended to the newly formed National University of Public Service on 1 January 2012.

From 2013 Corvinus University of Budapest offered a Summer School program.

In February 2019, the government announced that it would place Corvinus University under the newly created Maecenas Universitatis Corvini Foundation from July 2019. The foundation will be allocated 10% of the government's stake in MOL and Gedeon Richter worth HUF 380 billion at the time, with the operational expenses to be paid with the dividends from these companies.

The new appointed rector became Előd Takáts on 1 August 2021, parallel with the change of control of the university, replacing András Lánczi after his six-year term.

== Faculties and programmes ==
At the Corvinus University, 11,500 students are enrolled in bachelor's, master's, single-cycle, postgraduate specialisation and doctoral programmes.

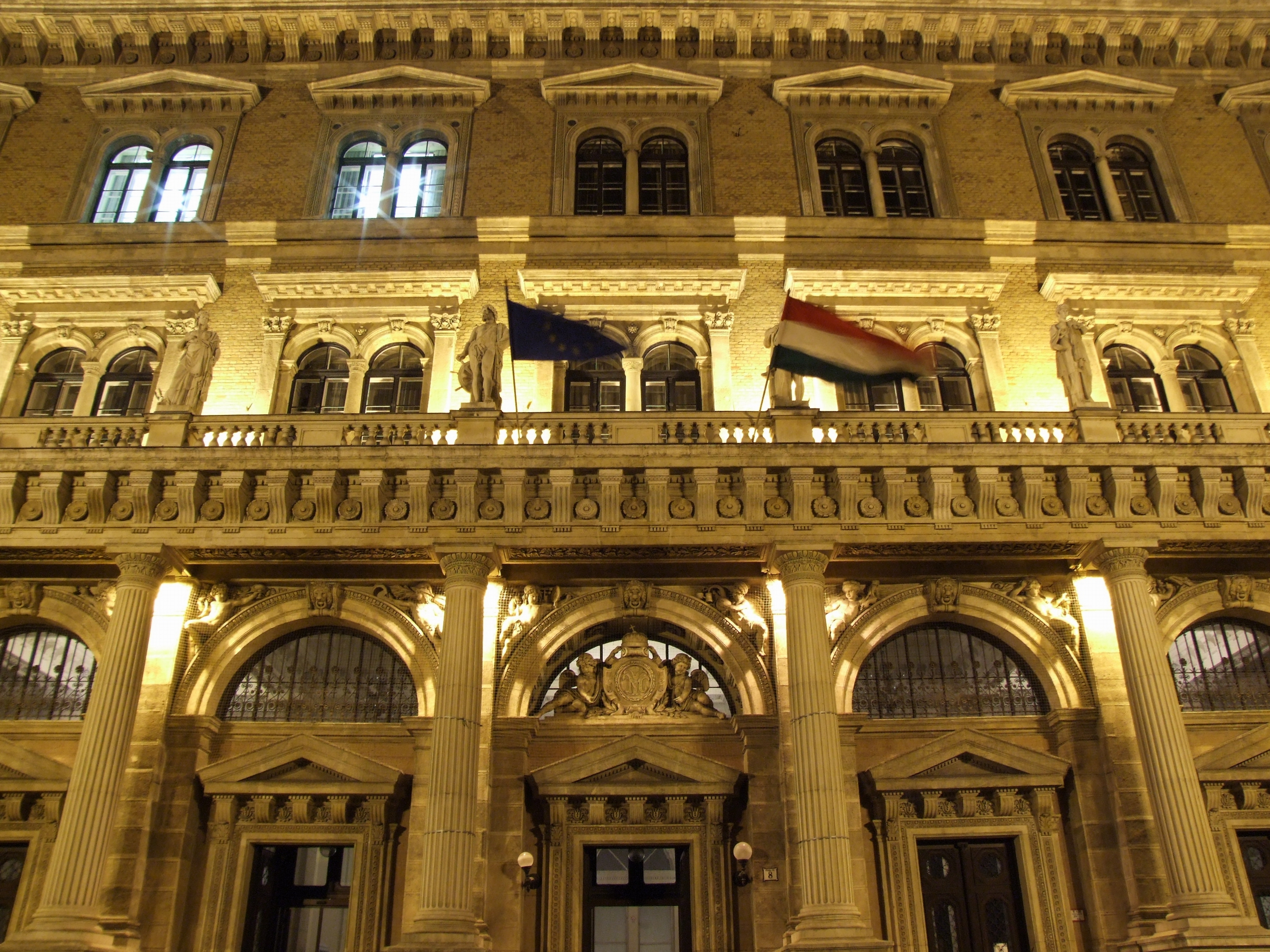
Façade of the university

The teaching activities previously organised under the faculties have been restructured for the 2019/20 academic year and have become institutionalised. Under the direction of the institutes, training is divided into departments. As of 2023/24 the institutes were as follows.

- Institute of Data Analytics and Information Systems
- Institute of Sustainable Development
- Institute of Global Studies
- Institute of Economics
- Institute of Marketing and Communication Studies
- Institute of Operations and Decision Sciences
- Institute of Finance
- Institute of Accounting and Law
- Institute of Social and Political Sciences
- Institute of Entrepreneurship and Innovation
- Institute of Strategy and Management

At Corvinus University of Budapest, doctoral studies currently cover seven fields of study:

- Doctoral School of Business and Management
- Doctoral School of Economics, Business, and Informatics
- Doctoral School of International Relations and Political Science
- Doctoral School of Sociology and Communication Science

The majority of courses are taught in English due to the growing internationalisation process based on an increasing number of foreign students.

== Setting and architecture ==
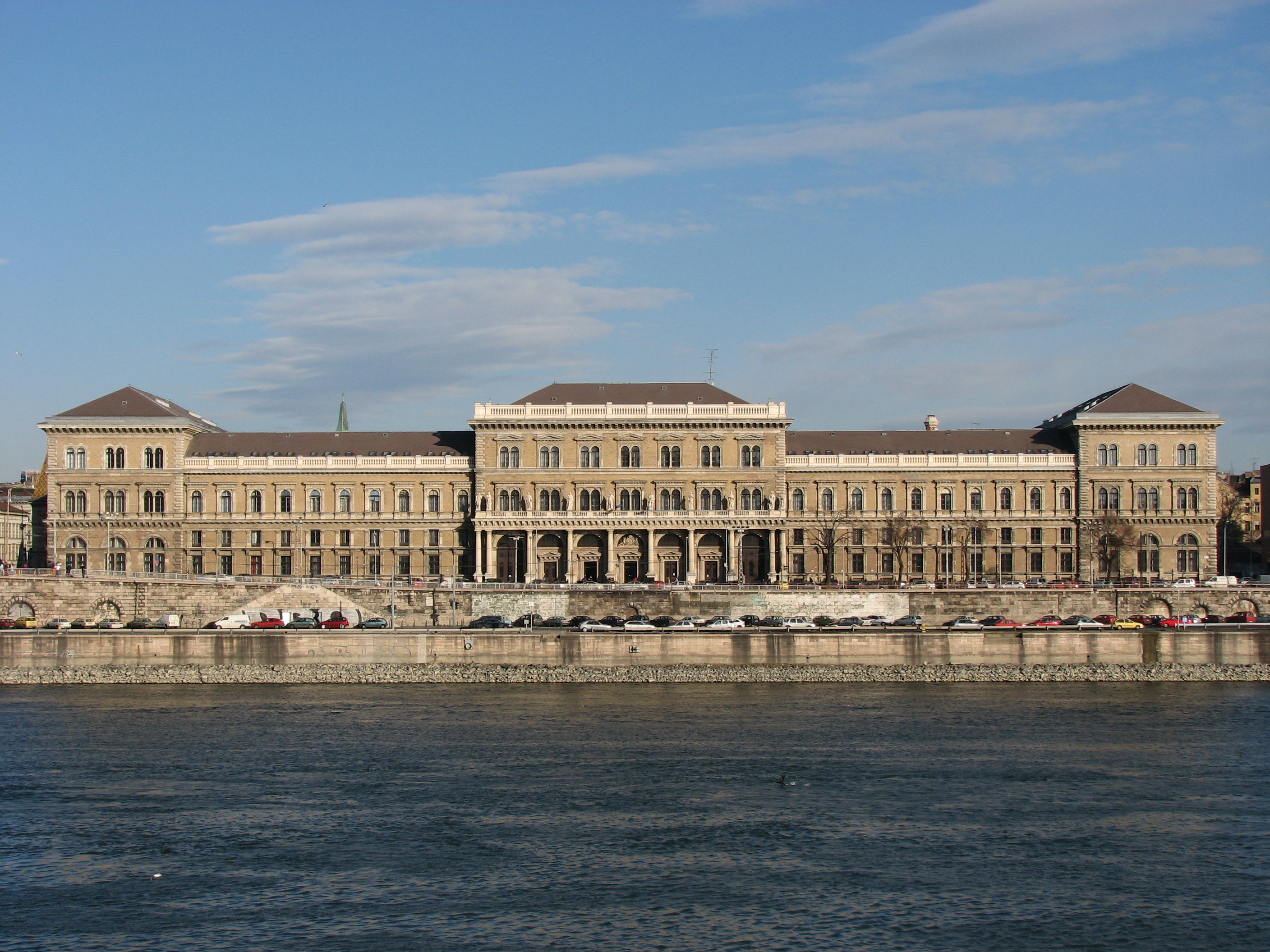
Main building

The university is in an urban setting. The faculties operate in multiple buildings that stand in the city centre of Budapest.

The university's main building (Building E)– now part of the UNESCO Heritage Site – is located in Pest on the left bank of the Danube, next to the Great Market Hall and facing the Budapest University of Technology and Economics on the river's other bank. The main building was planned by Miklós Ybl as the Main Customs Office in Neo-Renaissance style. It was finished in 1874. The building was called "Vámház" (Customs House) and "Fővámpalota" (Chief Customs Palace). This is also the name of the nearby avenue. The building was connected to ports of the Danube by four tunnels. It had a railroad connection. During WW2 the Hungarian, German and Soviet troops used the building as a military base. The Customs House suffered serious damage during the war. In 1948 it became the main building of the University of Economics. It underwent major renovations in 1950 and later in 1989–1990.

Much of the education of the business faculties (Faculty of Business Administration, Economics, Social Sciences) takes place in the main building. This is the location of the rector's offices as well. Next to the main building is the S(alt)-building (Sóház), and behind that is the C-Building.

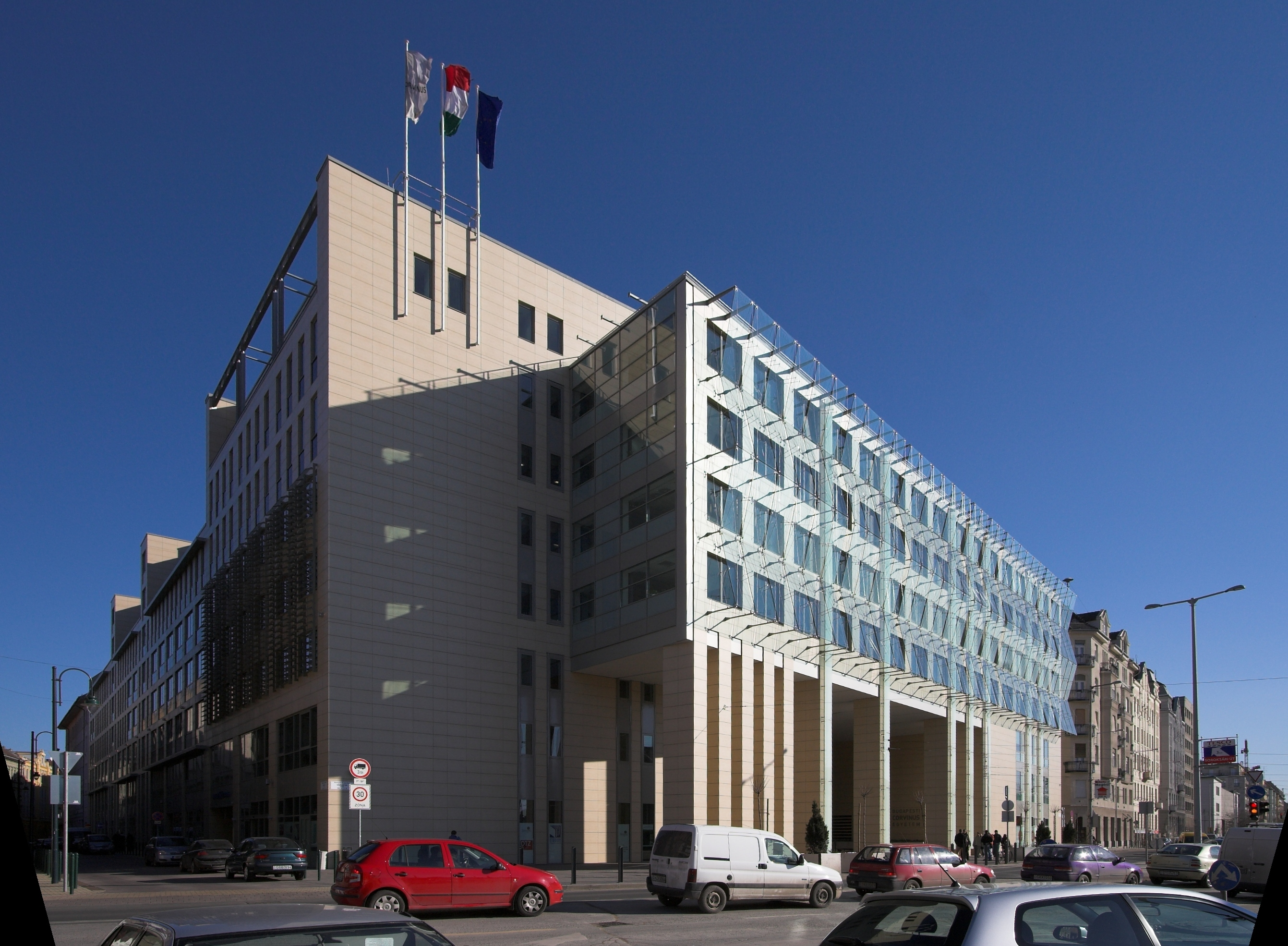
The Közraktár Street building

The university's Közraktár Street building was completed in 2007. It offers 50,000 square metres (540,000 sq ft) of floor space, which includes an office building and education areas. The building has community areas, and hosts the 450-seat central library of the university which contains 100,000 books and journals.

== Research ==
The Regional Centre for Energy Policy Research was established in 2004. The three main pillars of the Research Centre are education, research and consultancy. Their analysis focuses mainly on electricity and natural gas markets. They have been working on water management issues since 2007 and on transport issues since 2017.

In 2018, the Corvinus Institute for Advanced Studies (CIAS), an international research centre, was established to strengthen Corvinus' scientific performance and international embeddedness. There are more than 20 research centres operating besides them at the university.

Several research-related journals (Society and Economy, Vezetéstudomány [Management], Corvinus Journal of Sociology and Social Policy, Corvinus Journal of International Affairs, and Köz-Gazdaság [Public Economy]) and publications (e.g. workshop series: Corvinus Economic Working Papers RePEc, and Corvinus Law Papers) are published by the university.

== Awards and rankings ==
In 2010, Corvinus won the Higher Education Quality Award in the Higher Education Institutions category. Its business majors are not only among the leading universities in Hungary, but are also internationally recognised: the university was ranked first in the region in 2019 by Eduniversal and second in 2020, and in 2019 it was ranked among the 100 best business schools in Europe by the Financial Times, while the university's master's degree in Regional and Environmental Management was ranked 36th in the category of Sustainable Development and Environmental Management, also by Eduniversal.

The university was listed in the top 50 in the Financial Times European Masters in Management rankings, and was the first Hungarian university mentioned among the best in the area of agriculture.

== Specialised colleges ==
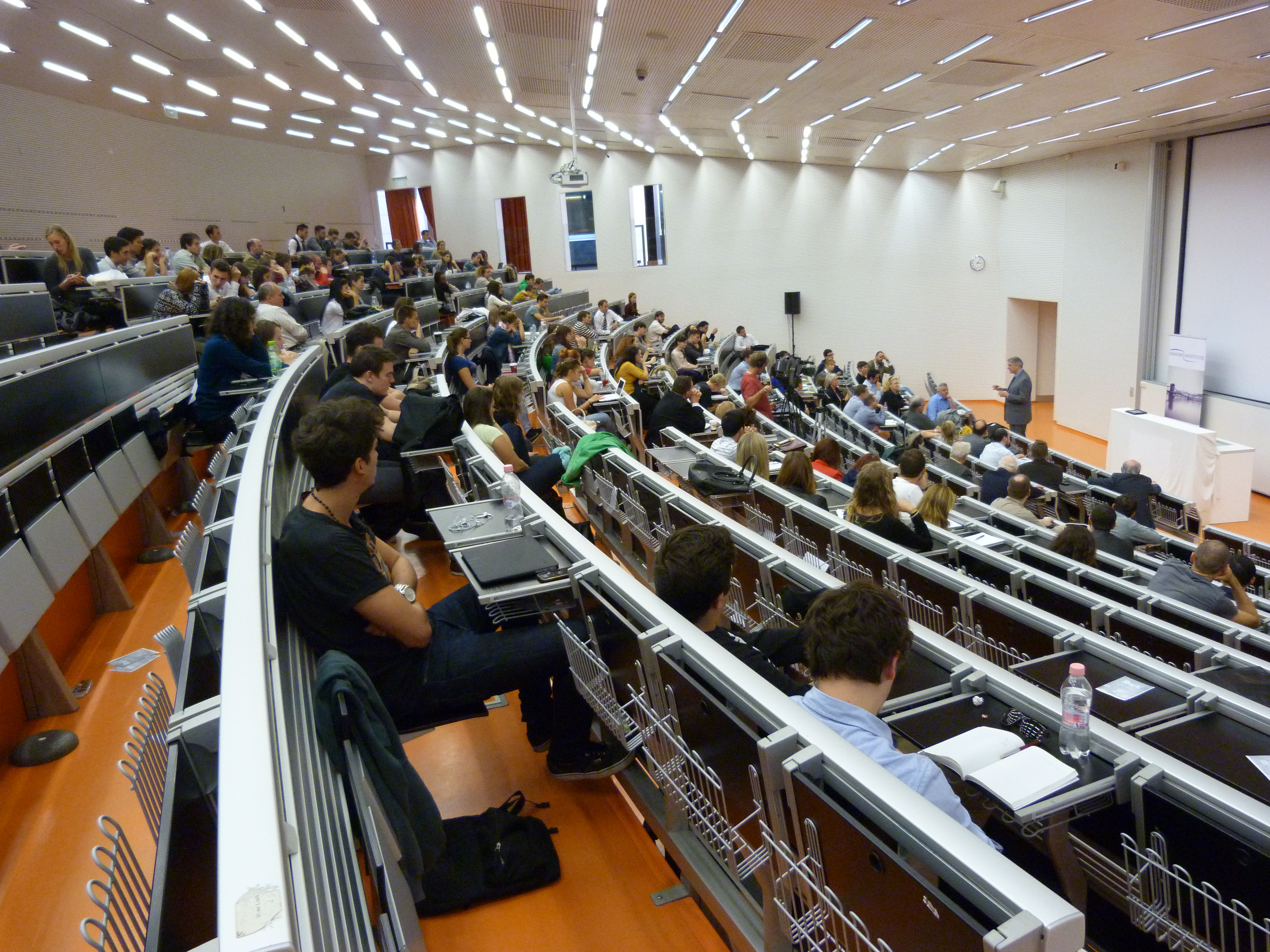
Lecture hall

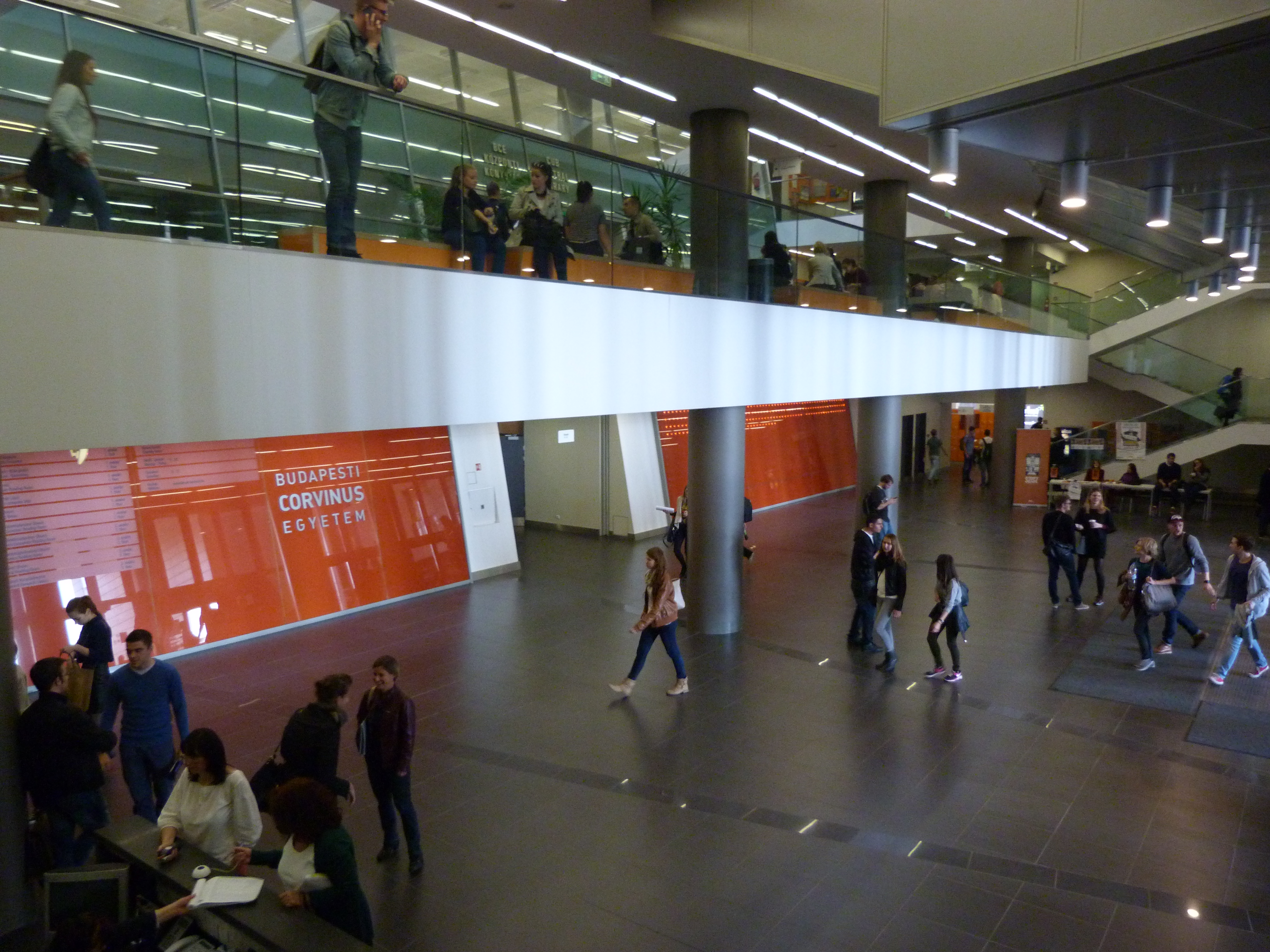
Central library at the new Közraktár building

The specialised colleges conduct in-depth research on a number of specialised subjects (e.g. social theory and finance), sometimes with the involvement of external academics or economic operators. Members usually live together on a separate floor of their university hall of residence or in a separate building. This promotes active community life and shared learning and research.

The most significant of the university's specialised colleges in 2020 are:

- Rajk László College for Advanced Studies
- Széchenyi István College for Advanced Studies
- College for Advanced Studies in Social Theory (Társadalomelméleti Kollégium, TEK)
- EVK College for Advanced Studies
- Heller Farkas College for Advanced Studies
- Society of Young Autonomous Economists (FAKT)
- College for Advanced Studies of Diplomacy in Practice (GyDSz)
- Mathias Corvinus Collegium
- Saint Ignatius Jesuit College of Excellence
- Specialised College of Practical Diplomacy

== Student organisations ==
In addition to the specialised colleges, Corvinus has more than 40 student organisations, making it the most active organised student life in the country. Some organisations have a professional focus, others are organised around a hobby, or internationalisation, etc.

== Notable alumni ==
- Sándor Csányi – chairman of OTP Bank, owner of Bonafarm, investor, philanthropist, billionaire, the third richest person in Hungary (according to Forbes)
- Gordon Bajnai – former prime minister of Hungary
- Sebastian Gorka – American military and intelligence analyst
- György Surányi – former governor of the National Bank of Hungary
- Fanny von Hann-Kende – physician and psychoanalyst
- Éva Hegedüs – Chairman-CEO and majority shareholder of Gránit Bank
- Ákos Kovács – pop-rock singer-songwriter
- Zoltán Kovács (born 1962), vice-president of the Hungarian Ice Hockey Federation and Paul Loicq Award recipient
- Lajos Bokros – former minister of finance, chairman of Budapest Stock Exchange
- Dávid Korányi – director at Atlantic Council
- József Váradi – CEO of Wizz Air
- Előd Takáts – rector of Corvinus University of Budapest, economist and leader at the Bank for International Settlements and the International Monetary Fund
- György Matolcsy – governor of the National Bank of Hungary since 2013
- François Lumumba – Congoloese politician
- Tibor Palánkai (born 1938), Rector of the University 1997-2000
- Balázs Kovács, professor at Yale
- Iván Szelényi, sociologist and dean at New York University Abu Dhabi
- Iván T. Berend, professor of history, emeritus at University of California, Los Angeles, Rector of the University 1973-1979
- Erzsébet Nováky, academic professor and researcher and a professor emeritus at the university.

== See also ==
- Open access in Hungary
