= Ecologically unequal exchange =

Concept from ecological economics

Ecologically or ecological unequal exchange is a concept from ecological economics that builds from the notion of unequal exchange. It considers the inequities hidden in the monetary value of trade flows not only in terms of wages, and quantities of labor but also regarding materials, energy and environmental degradation. As labor is also a form of energy, unequal exchange of embodied labor can even be considered a subset of the wider phenomenon of ecologically unequal exchange.

There is an uneven utilization of the environment at the global level not only due to the uneven distribution of resources, but also to shift the environmental burden. The consumption and capital accumulation of core countries are based on environmental degradation and extraction in periphery countries. Sustainability analysis and solutions with a production-based perspective in core countries may thus keep increasing unsustainability at the global level. The current configuration of global production networks that leads to this asymmetric trade patterns has evolved historically with colonialism. Whereas ecological unequal exchange is a concept developed in academia, the concept of ecological debt is used in an activism context of environmental justice. The latter defines the accumulation of this unequal exchange through history.

== History ==
The conceptual basis of EUE can be traced in the metabolic rift concept of Karl Marx. This concept described "his concern with how 19th century large-scale industry and agriculture under capitalism combined to impoverish the soil (environment) and the worker through the growing asymmetric exchange of nutrients and other material resources between town and countryside."

In the 1940 Raúl Prebisch observed a hierarchy in the global economic system and deterioration of trade for primary product while working for the United Nations Economic Commissions for America Latina. This core-periphery hypothesis rejected the theory of comparative advantage by David Ricardo. The unequal exchange theory, developed among the others by Arghiri Emmanuel, was further built on by Stephen Bunker, who added the ecological aspects of material and energy flows, and by Alf Hornborg, who argued for the assessment of net flows of matter-energy.

== Theory ==
Ecologically unequal exchange (EUE) refers to the environmental aspects of unequal exchange: it is an empirical evidence-based concept that refers to the effect of the structure of international trade under capitalism, in particular to the asymmetric flow of embodied materials and energy from peripheral countries - mainly located in the Global South - to the core developed world. From this perspective, Global South countries tend to serve as a source of raw materials, sink for waste products and places to establish sacrifice zones, perpetuating global inequalities and uneven environmental impacts which disproportionately harm the people in developing countries but serve the productive capacity and the economy of the so-called developed.

The EUE theory is based on the world-systems perspective developed by Immanuel Wallerstein, Samir Amin, Giovanni Arrighi and Andre Gunder Frank. The idea behind world-system theory is that the capitalist-world economy is economically and geographically divided into an affluent core and less developed periphery, and in which surplus value flows from the periphery to the core.

The logical result of EUE theory is that the Global North owes to the Global South an ecological debt. The difference between the concepts of EUE and ecological debt is that the EUE theory was developed in academia and the ecological debt by environmental justice and decolonial activists. EUE can be seen as the mechanism and ecological debt as the historical accumulation of debt by rich countries because of EUE. According to Joan Martinez-Alier, the difference between the concept of Unequal Ecological Exchange and "ecological debt" (Martinez-Alier et al. 2014) is formal. While the former EUE originated in academia, Ecological Debt is a concept born within Environmental Justice Organizations in the 1990s, and only later taken up by academics (Martinez-Alier 2002; Warlenius et al. 2015a, 2015b). The concept appeared as a response to the economic debt that was putting pressure on the global South, which is considered a mechanism of the North to exploit Southern peoples and the environment. The main argument was that the South is not simply a debtor to the North, but instead the North has generated an ecological debt towards the South through the long-term exploitation of its natural resources and sinks. It is now a framework that climate justice activists and wider circles refer to.

== Calculations ==
One of the most updated calculations of the Ecological Unequal Exchange is constituted by Dorninger et al.'s study, which shows that:

- High-income nations are net importers of embodied materials, energy, land, and labor. They depend in large part on extraction from the global south: half of the total materials consumed by high-income countries are extracted from poorer countries.
- High-income nations gain a monetary trade surplus via this resource appropriation.
- Lower-income nations provide resources but experience monetary trade deficits.

The EUE hypothesis is also confirmed by Corsi et al., who show that relations between countries follow dynamics of exploitation and control rather than competition, as it is often assumed. Periphery and semi-periphery present higher environmental intensities, but the burden of such environmental degradation can be directly attributed to global north regions, which acquire and manage the allocation of most environmental resources. Core regions enhance their economic and environmental performance at the national level by exploiting and controlling semi-periphery and periphery regions.

Recently, researchers have been focusing on the EUE between specific regions of the world. Bruckner et al. analyze the Ecologically unequal exchanges driven by EU consumption. They take into consideration the global distribution of ten selected environmental pressures and impacts, as well as value added induced by EU consumption from 1995 to 2019, and show how large parts of all such negative environmental impacts are outsourced to regions outside the EU, while more than 80% of the economic benefits stay within the member countries. They also find an uneven distribution of costs and benefits within the EU. Moreover, they show how between 1995 and 2019 pressures and impacts induced by EU consumption largely decreased within the EU but increased outside its borders.

== Implications ==
According to Dorninger et al. their calculations confirm the hypothesis that:

relationships of ecologically unequal exchange are a prerequisite for the seamless functioning of modern technology (e.g. the automobile industry and its infrastructure, energy production, but also industrial livestock production systems, textiles, or electronics). Therefore, economic growth and technological progress in 'core areas' of the world-system occurs at the expense of the peripheries (Jorgenson and Kick, 2003; Wallerstein, 1974), i.e. growth is fundamentally a matter of appropriation (Hornborg, 2016). In fact, modern technological systems may, in part, be driven by differences in how human time and natural space are compensated in different parts of the world. High resource consumption is enabled by globally prolonged supply chains, favoring countries with high-value added processes (Prell et al., 2014)

According to Hornborg, this means that, because the economic growth model of industrialization requires the appropriation of resources from poorer regions, thinking that poor nations will be able to 'catch-up' is an illusion.

Differently from the intra-country inequalities that can be resolved with redistributive policies, the EUE requires a global will to change the rules of the international trade system that create these disparities. For this reason supporters of the EUE theory are also against the ecological modernizations framework utilized mainly by the rich countries, that search for the technological solutions in order to resolve the environmental problems instead of social solutions.

For Corsi et al., the existence of an EUE shows how sustainability strategies presumed on green growth and dematerialization allow some regions of the Global North to "increase economic growth and improve their environmental performance at the expense of consuming the environmental space of others (mainly Semi-periphery), which in turn perpetrates similar dynamics towards Peripheral regions (Global South) [...] The global economy is far from a perfectly competitive market, being most of the capacity to drive and acquire ecological resources vastly concentrated in a handful of economically powerful countries". Thus, they mention post-growth theories as necessary to design future global sustainability policies.

Jason Hickel is one of the most popular scholars exploring degrowth in the global north as a solution to end relations of EUE. Hickel suggests reducing consumption and production in the Global North to sustainable levels, which would alleviate the pressure on ecosystems and communities in the Global South.

== Criticism ==
Peter Somerville, writing for the journal Capitalism Nature Socialism, criticized ecological unequal exchange theory as "confused, internally inconsistent, and misrepresents the nature of global extractivism and labour exploitation."
