= Theotônio dos Santos =

Brazilian economist (1936–2018)

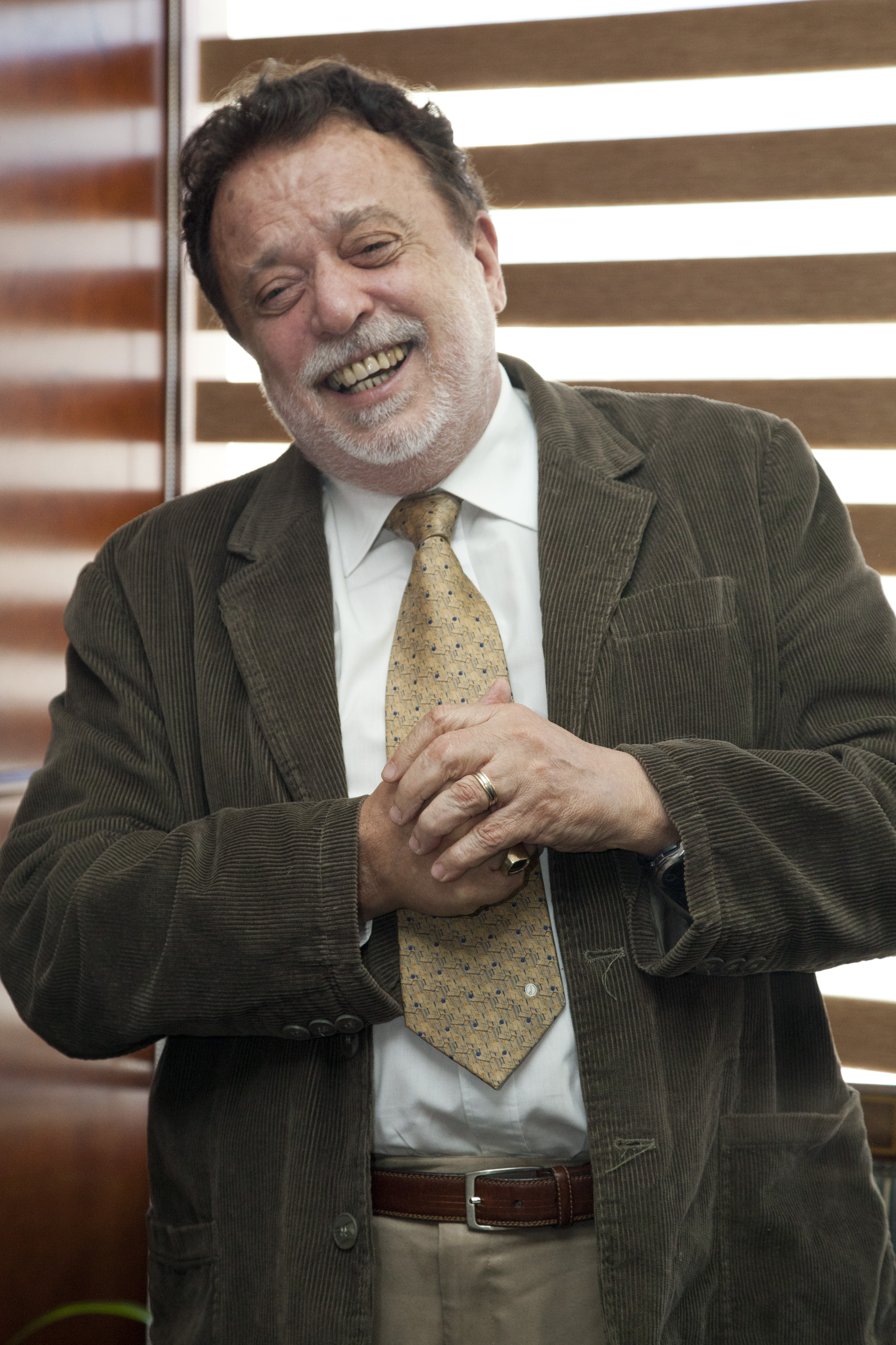
Dos Santos in 2012

Theotônio dos Santos Junior (11 November 1936 in Carangola – 27 February 2018 in Rio de Janeiro) was a Brazilian economist. He was one of the formulators of the Dependency Theory and supported the World-System theory.

Dos Santos had a bachelor's degree in sociology and politics in public administration from the Federal University of Minas Gerais and a master's degree in political science from the University of Brasília. He received the title of notório saber (equivalent to a doctorate) in economics from the Federal University of Minas Gerais and the Fluminense Federal University, at the latter of which he was Professor Emeritus. He coordinated for both the UNESCO Chair in Cultural Policies and Cooperation and the United Nations University in global economy and sustainable development.

He was a professor at the Universities of Brasília, Nacional Autónoma de México, Northern Illinois, New York State, Catholic University of Minas Gerais, Rio de Janeiro, Bennett Institute of Rio de Janeiro, and Federal University of Minas Gerais.

Dos Santos most notable contributions to the fields of economy and social sciences are his general formulation of the concept of dependency, the periodisation of the many phases of dependency throughout the history of capitalistic society, as well as the characterisation of the internal dependent structures and the definition of the reproductive mechanisms of said dependency. He also worked in the Theory of Economic Cycles, the long term dynamics of capitalism, and the world-systems theory. Additionally, he formulated the concept of "Planetary Civilisation".

== Life ==
=== Early life ===
Theotônio dos Santos was born in Carangola, Minas Gerais, 11 November 1936 and was officially registered on 11 January 1937. From 1958 to 1961, he studied in the Federal University of Minas Gerais, for his bachelor's degree in sociology, politics and public administration. He also systematically studied Marxism as a culmination of his philosophical studies between 1960 and 1964. He participated in many student-oriented movements until 1966, clandestinely after the military coup of 1964.

=== Academic years and first phase of theory ===
During the 1960s, dos Santos, along with Ruy Mauro Marini, Luis Fernando Victor, Teodoro Lamounier, Albertino Rodriguez, Perseu Abramo and Vania Bambirra started a seminar in Brasília for the reading of Karl Marx's Das Kapital. It reconvened in Chile where it attracted some of the main interpreters of Marx's work.

When he studied Political Sciences in Brasília, Theotônio started a line of investigation about the structure of the economic classes of Brazil which culminated in his thesis titled The Social Classes in Brazil: first part - the proprietary, which he finished in 1964. This investigation served as the basis for his 1962 book Who are the Enemies of the People , in order to clarify the terms in which the class struggle waged between the popular movement and the fractions of the Brazilian ruling class took place, the context of the reorganization of the post-war world capitalist system, and to propose the general lines of an economic program destined to "carry forward our development, eliminate misery and illiteracy", linking basic reforms to socialism.

During these years, he participated in many social movements in the country and went clandestine after the coup of 1964. At the peak of his political militancy, he participated in the POLOP, a movement he helped create in 1961 and took control over in 1964. POLOP had an opposing view to the communist parties and Stalinism, calling the left-wing revolutionary movements to organize against the policy of a united front with the bourgeoisie, which was proposed by the PCB.

With the military coup, dos Santos was forced out of his job in the University of Brasília, had his political rights revoked and eventually forced into exile in 1966, when he went to Chile, joining the University of Chile as an investigator and posteriorly as the director of CESO. During this period he worked to develop his studies and theories.

=== First exile ===
Once in Chile, dos Santos joined CESO, where he united many social scientists from Chile, Brazil and other Latin American countries to study imperialism and its impacts on independent societies. He later became the director of CESO.

During these years he published many books, reports and articles, including the magazine Chile Hoy. He, along with his fellow theorists of the theory of dependency, influenced the local politics of Chile, in particular the program of political parties and the party of Salvador Allende. He also consolidated his position as an investigator of contemporary capitalism and socialism.

=== Second exile ===
During the counterrevolution of 1973, dos Santos was forced to seek refuge again and went to Mexico in 1974, where he became a professor in the faculty of Economics and philosophy of the Universidad Nacional Autónoma De México. In 1975, he was nominated as coordinator of the Doctorate in Economics of UNAM and, in 1976, chief of the postgraduate division of UNAM, which he assumed until his return to Brazil in 1979.

At this time, he started working on a more complete version of his dependency theory, which would be later used as the basis of the World-System theory, for which he used as a foundation of one of his works initiated in CESO, which were mostly destroyed by the government forces of Pinochet's Chile. His new theory combined the development of the capitalistic system of the world with the long term cycles of Nikolai Kondratiev, getting closer to the theory of systematic cycles of accumulation worked on by Andre Gunder Frank, Giovanni Arrighi, Samir Amin and Wallerstein.

=== Return to Brazil ===
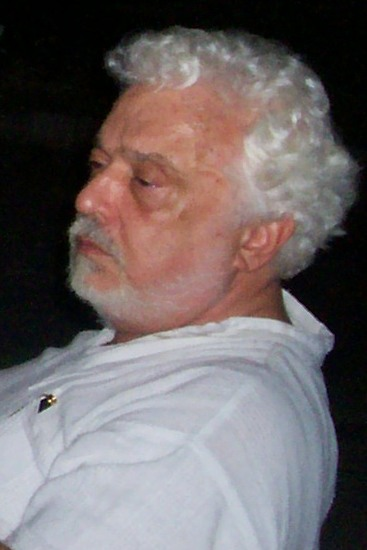
Dos Santos in 2008

Dos Santos' return to Brazil started with his work analyzing the reality of life in Brazil while he was still in Mexico, as well as his participation in the political reorganization of the Brazilians who were exiled by the military regime, looking for a unification between socialists and labourers, which he achieved in the meeting of Lisbon. He was granted amnesty in 1980 and returned to the country in January of that year.

He became one of the founding members of the Democratic Labor Party in Brazil (PDT), which based itself in socialism. He then ran as a candidate for the role of governor in Minas Gerais in 1982 and federal deputy in 1986, with both attempts failing.

During the 1980s, he strengthened his links to the United Nations and became a consultant in the United nations University (UNU) and UNESCO. He also became the president of the Latin American Sociology Association (ALAS), a member of the executive consul of the Latin American Association of Scientific politics and technology, consultant for the Latin American economic system (SELA), and director of studies for la Maison des Sciences de l'Homme of the University of Paris. In Brazil, he took over the direction of the training center of the FESP-RJ in 1983, where he established a system of pre- and post-graduate studies, through which he created a web of contacts with scientists worldwide. In 1985 Theotônio became a Notório Saberin Economics, at the UFMG and took the position of Titular professor in 1986. In 1988 he was allowed to rejoin the UnB through the Law of Amnesty. In 1994, he became a titular professor in the Fluminense Federal University (UFF). Throughout the 1990s, he mostly worked on projects related to the UFF and served as a professor for many of its programs, including the post-graduate program in International Relations and the post-graduate program in foreign studies. He took the role of Secretary of International Affairs of the government of the state of Rio de Janeiro.

In the months leading up to the elections of 2010, Theotônio wrote an open letter to the ex-president Fernando Henrique Cardoso (known as FHC) in response to a letter written by Cardoso to the presidential candidate Luiz Inácio Lula da Silva. In this letter, among other things, he criticized the statement that the FHC government was an economic success based on the valorization of the Real. He concluded: "The Real Plan did not bring down inflation, but rather a world deflation which caused the world inflation levels to fall".

=== Death ===
Theotônio dos Santos Junior died 27 February 2018 of pancreatic cancer.

== Theories and works ==
=== Dependency Theory ===
Dos Santos is known for his formulation of "new dependency", which comprehends the period of the dominion of multinational corporations after World War II. In 1960, with the help of colleagues Ruy Mauro Marini, Andre Gunder Frank, and Vânia Bambirra, he formulated the dependency theory, a critical, Marxist non-dogmatic interpretation of the reproductive processes of the underdevelopment of peripheral countries in a capitalistic society. This theory gained attention in late-1960s and early-1970s Latin America, where many countries were struggling economically.

In this line of thinking, the characterization of countries as "late boomers" comes from the relation of worldly capitalism dependency between "central" countries and "peripheral" countries. This dependency expresses "subordination", the idea that the development of a country is directly linked to the development of other countries; the development is not brought upon by pre-capitalistic conditions, but rather by the patterns of capitalistic development of the countries together with its insertion into the capitalist system given by imperialism.

It further states that in order to overcome its underdevelopment, a country must break its dependency on other countries, and not modernize or industrialize its economy, which could actually intensify its dependency on other countries. Because of this, the fight against dependency must focus on the rupture of imperialistic ties, and maybe, even the capitalistic system as a whole.

The theory reached its peak in the early 1970s when it propagated throughout Latin America, the United States, Europe, Africa and Asia. However, after the fall of the Chilean Allende Government in 1973, which was heavily based on the dependency theory, critics of this theory increased in number. The theory does not have many proponents today, though it is still argued to be a good conceptual orientation to the global division of wealth.

=== World-systems Theory ===
In the early 1980s, dos Santos transitioned seamlessly from the theory of dependency to the theory of world-systems. He based this theory on his works from Chile, which were mostly destroyed by the governmental forces of the Pinochet dictatorship. The world-systems theory divides the world into core and peripheral countries on the basis of labour division, in which the core countries focus on high-skill, capital-intensive industries, while the peripheral states focused on lower-skill, labour-intensive production, as well as raw material extraction. Due to this system, the core countries exert dominance over the peripheral ones, making the latter dependent on the former.

=== Main bibliographic works ===
- O Conceito de classes sociais, Ed. Vozes, Brazil, also published in other 5 Latin American countries
- Crisis económica y crisis política, mimeo CESO, Chile (1966).
- El nuevo carácter de la dependencia, Chile (1967).
- Socialismo o Fascismo: el dilema latinoamericano (1969).
- Dependencia y cambio social (1972).
- Socialismo o Fascismo: el nuevo carácter de la dependencia y el dilema latinoamericano, Ed. PLA, Santiago, also published in Argentina, Mexico and Italy (1972 and revised in 1974).
- Imperialismo y dependencia (1978), Ed. Era, México; Tsuge Shogo, Japão; Science academy, China.
- Teorias do capitalismo contemporâneo, Ed. Vega/Novo Espaço, Brasil (1983).
- Forças produtivas e relações de produção, Ed. Vozes, Brasil.
- Revolução científico-técnica e capitalismo contemporâneo, Ed. Vozes, Brasil (1983).
- Revolução científico-técnica e acumulação de capital, Ed. Vozes, Brasil (1987).
- Democracia e socialismo no capitalismo dependente, Ed. Vozes, Brasil (1991).
- A evolução histórica no Brasil: da colônia à crise da Nova República, Ed. Vozes, Brasil (1993).
- Economia mundial, integração regional e desenvolvimento sustentável, Ed. Vozes, Brasil - also published as Economía mundial y la integración latinoamericana, Ed. Plaza y Janés (2004).
- A Teoria da Dependência: balanço e perspectivas, Ed. Civilização Brasileira, 2000.
- Do terror à esperança - auge e declínio do neoliberalismo, Ed. Ideias e Letras, 2004.

=== REGGEN ===
In 1997, dos Santos founded and led REGGEN (Portuguese: Rede de Economia Global e Desenvolvimento Sustentável, lit. 'Network of Global Economy and Sustainable Development'). It serves as a network of international institutions and researchers in the global economy, globalization, sustainable development and economic development, and a program from both the UNU and UNESCO.

== Honorees ==
- Commander of the Order of Rio Branco
- Doctor Honoris Causa by the Ricardo Palma University (Lima, Peru)
- Doctor Honoris Causa by the National University of San Marcos (Lima, Peru)
- Doctor Honoris Causa by the University of Buenos Aires
- Doctor Honoris Causa by the University of Valparaiso (Chile)
