= FC Apatride UTD =

FC Apatride UTD is a Roots Reggae band from Belgrade city. The band was born in a ravaged country as a response to the neo-colonial atmosphere in political, economic and cultural trends dominating all fields of life in the Balkans, in the aftermath of the imperialist intervention. Using reggae music as a rebellious means of expression, the band addresses the issues of importance in neo-colonies from the Marxist perspective, and links art to actual class struggles on the ground, involving anti-xenophobia, shelter for refugees, anti-NATO shows, boycott of the bourgeois media etc. Signed for a Parisian label Makasound, the band released two albums before moving to British label Urban Sedated Records.

== Members ==
- Kapa - Drums
- Tony - Guitar
- Alexa - Bass (Also a member of Vizelj)
- Kheirawi - Vocals
- Lesa - Dub

== Music ==
The band describes its music as a hardcore reggae, meaning it refrains from market like influences of Pop music and other popular trends turning reggae acceptable to the establishment. They play sharp and heavy Roots style with militant lyrics. Band Name is inspired by both Apatride legal status, meaning "countryless" but also "above any nation" in combination with Unity and love for Football In their own words:

== Social Campaigns ==
- 2009 Anti NATO protest
- 2012 Anti-voting campaign and concert, calling on people to refrain from voting in Serbian general elections.
- 2013 Never bomb Syria concert, in support of the struggle of the Syrian people against imperialism
- 2014 Roots for refugees - aid concert for Asylum seekers in Serbia
- 2015 Show against media - campaign against mainstream mass media in Serbia
- 2018 Against capitalist terror - a benefit show for the family of a worker who committed suicide after not being able to pay the electricity bill

== Politics ==
Band has been known for "Third Worldist" socialist ideas e.g. that through the Capital export and an Uneven exchange, First World countries exploit the Third World, thus creating super profits which also benefit the proletariat of the Core countries, and so the working class in the imperialist core is an ally of the bourgeoisie, and has an objective class interest in supporting imperialism. The band suggest following Samir Amin's proposal of delinking, and a necessary socialist transformation of the Global South as a way forward. In 2012 Tear gas was thrown during the bands concert because they were viewed as extreme left band, but the perpetrators were never caught, nor have the authorities propelled an investigation Link Blic newspaper .

== Discography ==
LPs

- 2006 - On The Frontline Menu (Makafresh)
- 2007 - Them (Makasound/Makafresh)
- 2009 - Firing The Truth (Urban Sedated Records/Wagon Music Works)
- 2017 - Roots History Book (Urban Sedated Records)
- 2019 - Third Worldism (Earth Works Outernational)

EPs

- 2008 Rural 12" (Urban Sedated Records)
- 2008 - War Party 12"- (Urban Sedated Records)

Videos

- Nah with'em - US elections 2008
- Fallujah - From the movie "Fear not the path of the truth"
- Desert Lion about the imperialist intervention in Libya
- Eyes of Cochise - On Indigenous struggle
- Big Bang - The creation
- Ah, Come! - Migration crisis
