= Charles Bettelheim =

French Marxian economist and historian

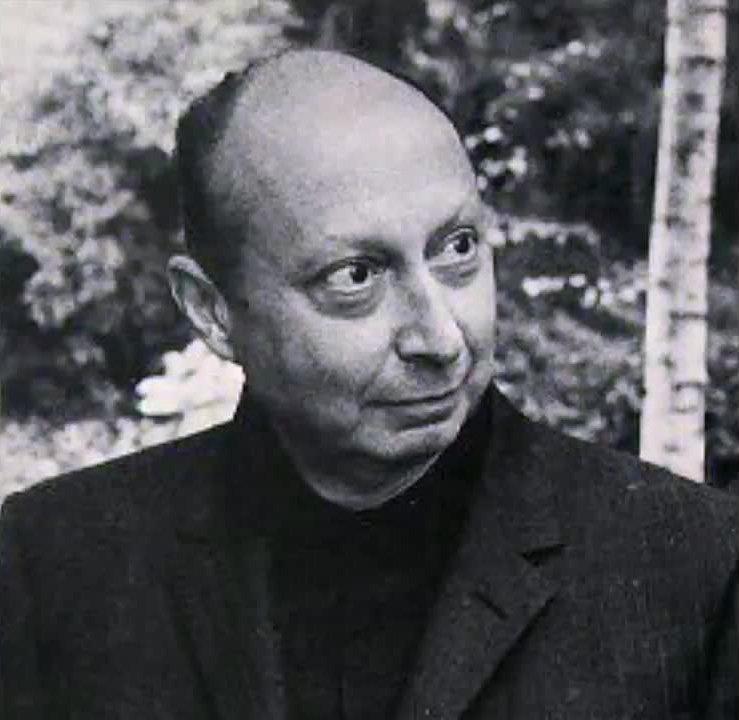
- Bettelheim in 1972
- Born: 20 November 1913; Paris, France
- Died: 20 July 2006 (aged 92); Paris, France
- Political party: PCF (1933–1937); POI (early 1940s)
- Spouse: Lucette Beauvallet (m. 1937)
- Children: 5

Education
- Education: University of Paris
- Doctoral advisor: Gaëtan Pirou

Philosophical work
- Era: Contemporary philosophy
- Region: Western philosophy
- School: Marxism; Maoism
- Institutions: École des Hautes Études en Sciences Sociales (the VIe section of the EPHE until 1975)
- Doctoral students: Arghiri Emmanuel
- Main interests: Marxian economics; Political philosophy; Socialism; Economic planning; Relations of production
- Notable ideas: Theory of the transition to socialism; Critique of economism; Class struggle under Soviet socialism; Theory of state capitalism

Charles Bettelheim (French: [bɛtɛlɛm]; 20 November 1913 – 20 July 2006) was a French Marxian economist and historian, founder of the Center for the Study of Modes of Industrialization (CEMI: Centre pour l'étude des modes d'industrialisation) at the EHESS, economic advisor to the governments of several developing countries during the period of decolonization. He was very influential in France's New Left, and considered one of "the most visible Marxists in the capitalist world" (Le Monde, 4 April 1972), in France as well as in Spain, Italy, Latin America, and India.

== Biography ==
Henri Bettelheim, the father of Charles Bettelheim, was a Viennese Austrian of Jewish origin, and a representative of a Swiss bank in Paris. The family had to leave France after the beginning of the First World War in 1914. The Bettelheims lived in Switzerland then in Egypt. In 1922, Charles Bettelheim returned to Paris with his French mother, during which time his father, who was living in Egypt, committed suicide.

After Adolf Hitler's rise to power in 1933, Charles Bettelheim broke away from his familiar environment, first joining the "Young Communists" (Jeunesses communistes), and subsequently the French Communist Party. In addition to his studies in philosophy, sociology, law and psychology, he also learned Russian. In July 1936, he arrived in Moscow with a tourist visa. Thanks to his mastery of the language, he was able to get a resident permit for five months, during which time he worked as a tourist guide, and later on with the French edition of the Moscow Journal, and finally at Mosfilm, where he directed film dubbing. His experiences during his Moscow stay, in the anxious atmosphere at the beginning of the "purges" and the trials of the Bolshevik leaders who opposed Joseph Stalin, made him keep a critical distance from the Soviet Union, without actually abandoning his Communist convictions. He was excluded from the Communist Party for his "slanderous" remarks. In 1937, he married a young militant Communist, Lucette Beauvallet. During the German occupation, he cooperated with the French Trotskyists (the Internationalist Workers Party).

His decision to choose economics as a profession was not an easy one, since at that time economics was considered a minor science; however, inasmuch as he had become so knowledgeable about the Soviet Union and about economic planning, Bettelheim was able to fill a gap. After World War II, he became an official in the Ministry of Labor. In 1948 he entered the "Sixth Section" of the École Pratique des Hautes Études (EPHE), the present-day EHESS.

In the 1950s, Bettelheim began his international activities as an advisor to the governments of Third World countries; he was the spokesperson for Gamal Abdel Nasser in Egypt, for Jawaharlal Nehru in India, and for Ahmed Ben Bella in Algeria. In 1958, he created an institutional base for his research by founding the CEMI. In 1963, Che Guevara invited him to Cuba, where he participated in a "grand debate" on socialist economics.

In 1966, Bettelheim was particularly interested in China. He helped the Union of Young Communists (Marxist–Leninist) with theoretical planning, without being directly affiliated with the organization. In his capacity as President of the Franco-Chinese Friendship Association (Association des amitiés Franco-Chinoises), he visited the People's Republic of China numerous times, in order to study new methods of industrial development created by the Cultural Revolution. Bettelheim was impressed by the implementation of the Angang Constitution in the factories he visited and the high levels of political consciousness among workers and cadre.

From 1980 onward, Bettelheim fell more and more by the wayside as a result of the profound political changes in the Third World and, in Europe, of the decline (and eventual dissolution) of "actually existing socialism". These developments rendered "obsolete" the paradigms of the debates to which Bettelheim had contributed so much, on the development of the countries of the South by means of planned economies independent of the world market.

Until his death, Bettelheim lived in Paris. He did not publish anything in his later years, but left an unfinished memoir. His student and long-time colleague Bernard Chavance is among the leading exponents of regulation theory.

== Thought ==
Despite his negative experiences in Moscow, Bettelheim retained a favorable attitude towards Soviet socialism until the Sixties, citing the economic accomplishments of the Soviet Union, which he appreciated from an independent point of view. In 1956, he endorsed the de-Stalinization inaugurated by Nikita Khrushchev at the Twentieth Congress of the Soviet Communist Party, as well as the 1965 economic reforms conceived by Soviet economist Evsei Liberman, suggesting a decentralization of decisions made within the planning leadership.

=== From the Cuban debate to the critique of "economism" ===
In the Cuban debate of 1963, Bettelheim was opposed to the voluntarist ideas of Che Guevara, who wanted to abolish free market and the production of merchandise through a very rapid and centralized industrialization, morally mobilizing "the new man." Bettelheim took a position against this plan, to which Fidel Castro had also subscribed: both Che Guevara and Castro preferred the monoculture of sugar as the basis of Cuban economy, rather than a strict analogy to the economy of the Soviet Union. In Cuba, Bettelheim recommended a diversified economy, based on agriculture, prudent industrialization, broad central planning, mixed forms of property ownership with market elements—a pragmatic strategy similar to the "New Economic Policy" begun in Russia by Vladimir Lenin in 1922. Opposing Guevara, Bettelheim argued (in line with the last writings of Stalin) that the "law of value" was the manifestation of objective social conditions which could not be overcome by willful decisions, but only by a process of long-term social transformation.

This debate demonstrated the profound differences which, from then on, separated Bettelheim from Marxist "orthodoxy", which considered socialism as the result of "the development of maximum centralization of all forces of industrial production". For Bettelheim, socialism is rather an alternative voice in development; a process of transformation of social understandings. Inspired by the Chinese Cultural Revolution and the thought of Mao Zedong, and in cooperation with the Marxist philosopher Louis Althusser, Bettelheim was opposed to "economism" and to the "primacy of the means of production" of traditional Marxism: against the idea that socialist transformation of social bonds was a necessary effect of the development of the forces of production (liberating those bonds from them, according to Marxist orthodoxy, since private property dominates them in "bourgeois" society), he affirmed the necessity for actively and politically transforming social connections. In his book Economic Calculations and Forms of Ownership (Calcul économique et formes de proprieté), Bettelheim re-thinks the problems of transition to socialism, while criticizing the supposition that nationalization and state ownership of the means of production was already "socialist"—it is not the legal form of property, but true socialization of the web of production, which characterizes such a transition; the crucial problem in socialist planning is the replacement of the form of "value" with the development of a method of measurement which takes into account the social utility of production.

=== Chinese experience and analysis of the Soviet Union ===
In China, Bettelheim had the impression that he was in the process of witnessing just such a process of transformation. More specifically, he noted that the Cultural Revolution—a revolution of the political, ideological and cultural superstructure—changed the industrial organization accompanying it by a general participation by the workers in all decisions, and overcoming the division of "manual" and "intellectual" labor. During these years, China was the benchmark for the neo-Marxist "radical school of economics", represented by Bettelheim, Paul Sweezy, Andre Gunder Frank, Samir Amin and others who, by fighting against theories of "modernization," affirmed that at the periphery of the worldwide capitalist system, in "under-developed" countries, "development" is only possible under conditions where these countries pry themselves free from their unequal and asymmetrical connections with the world market, dominated by imperialist countries, in order to choose a different and autonomous path: a development of production neither for profit, nor for an accumulation of abstract wealth, but for the needs of the people.

Under the banner of a "Maoist" approach, Bettelheim began his voluminous work on the history of the Soviet Union: Les luttes de classes en URSS (1974–1982) (Class Struggle in the USSR (1974–1982)), where he examines the reasons for the distortions of soviet socialism, which, according to Bettelheim, is nothing more than a "state capitalism." Bettelheim showed that after the October Revolution, the Bolsheviks had not succeeded in any long-term stabilization of the alliance between workers and poor peasants which had earlier been conceived by Lenin. During the 1920s, this alliance was replaced by an alliance of elite workers and technological intellectuals against the peasants, culminating in the forced collectivization of agriculture in 1928. "Economistic" ideology (the "primacy of the forces of production"), born in social-democracy and fed by the interests of the "worker aristocracy" and progressivist intellectuals, was resurrected by the enablement of the Bolshevik Party, acting as a legitimization of new technocratic elites which established the same divisions of labor and social differentiations, as had capitalism. However, the "legal" mirage, according to which the property of the State is defined as "socialist," hides the actual exploitation.

Finally, Bettelheim called into doubt the socialist character of the October Revolution, interpreting it as a seizing of power by a radical branch of the Russian intelligentsia, which "confiscated" a popular revolution.

Bettelheim was a leading proponent of the thesis that "development" in the countries of the "Third World" necessitates a political break with imperialism and a distantanglement from the bonds of dependency on the unequal international division of labor of the world market. This position also includes a sharp criticism of the international role of the Soviet Union whose politics of development Bettelheim saw as just another variant of capitalist accumulation models. This theory saw a chance for a disentanglement of the political groundwork in order to practice an alternative development model, one that was not oriented towards accumulation and profit, but rather towards an economy for the everyday needs of the people, with a balanced proportion allowed between agriculture and industry.

=== Bettelheim's later works ===
When, in 1978, the People's Republic of China, under the leadership of Deng Xiaoping, put paid to the "Maoist" strategy of autarkic ("independent, self-sustaining") development, guided by political priorities, in order to reaffirm the primacy of the economy and to introduce itself into the world market, the theoreticians' paradigm of autonomous development lost the force of its convictions. In 1982, he published the two volumes of the third part of Class Struggle in the USSR.

== Publications ==
- La planification soviétique. Rivière, 1945 (Soviet planning)
- L'économie allemande sous le nazisme, un aspect de la décadence du capitalisme. Rivière, 1946 (Bibliothèque générale d'économie politique) (The German economy under Nazism, an Aspect of the Decadence of Capitalism)
- Les Problèmes théoriques et pratiques de la planification. 1946.
- Bilan de l'économie française (1919–1946). PUF, 1947 (Balance-sheet for the French Economy)
- Esquisse d'un tableau économique de l'Europe. Domat, 1948 (Draft of an economic picture of Europe)
- L'économie soviétique. Sirey, 1950 (The Soviet Economy)
- Une ville française moyenne. Auxerre en 1950. Étude de structure sociale et urbaine (avec Suzanne Frère). Colin, 1950 (Cahiers de la fondation nationale des sciences politiques) (An Average French City. Auxerre in 1950. Study of the Social and Urban Structure.
- Modèles de croissance et développement économique. Tiers-Monde, tome I, nos. 1-2, 1960 (Models of Economic Growth and Development)
- L'Inde indépendante. Colin, 1962 (Independent India)
- Planification et croissance accélérée. Maspero, 1965 (Collection Économie et socialisme) (Planning and Accelerated Growth)
- La transition vers l'économie socialiste. Maspero, 1968 (Transition to a Socialist Economy)
- Problèmes théoriques et pratiques de la planification. Maspero, 1970 (Theoretical and Practical Problems with Planning)
- Calcul économique et formes de propriété. Maspero, 1971 (Economic Calculus and Forms of Ownership)
- Révolution culturelle et organisation industrielle en Chine. Maspero, 1973 (Cultural Revolution and Industrial Organization in China)
- Les luttes de classes en URSS – Première période, 1917-1923. Seuil/Maspero, 1974 (Class Conflict in the USSR—First period, 1917-1923)
- Les luttes de classes en URSS – Deuxième période, 1923-1930. Seuil/Maspero, 1977 (Class Conflict in the USSR—Second period, 1923-1930)
- Questions sur la Chine, après la mort de Mao Tsé-toung. Maspero, 1978 (Collection Économie et socialisme) (Questions about China after the Death of Mao Tse-tung)
- Les luttes de classes en URSS – Troisième période, 1930-1941. Tome I: Les dominés, tome II: Les dominants. Seuil/Maspero, 1982 ("Class Conflict in the USSR -- Third Period, 1930-1941. Vol. I: "The Dominated," Vol II: "The Dominators.")
- La pensée marxienne à l'épreuve de l'histoire, interview in Les Temps modernes, nº 472, 1985 (Marxist Thinking About the Experience of History)
- La pertinence des concepts marxiens de classe et lutte de classes pour analyser la société soviétique, dans Marx en perspective, Éditions de l'EHESS, 1985 (The Relevance of Marxist Concepts of Class Conflict to the Analysis of Soviet Society)
