= Bert F. Hoselitz =

American economist

Berthold Frank Hoselitz
- Born: 27 May 1913; Vienna, Austria
- Died: 14 February 1995 (aged 81); Chicago, Illinois, U.S.

Academic background
- Education: University of Vienna
- Influences: Talcott Parsons, Ludwig von Mises, Jacob Viner

Academic work
- Discipline: Economics
- Institutions: University of Chicago, Carnegie Institute of Technology

Berthold Frank Hoselitz (1913–1995) taught Economics and Social Science at the University of Chicago between 1945 and 1978. His analysis of the role of cultural and sociological factors in economic development was influential and contrasted to Chicago School models of self-interested maximizing behavior. Hoselitz was the founding editor of Economic Development and Cultural Change, a prominent journal in the new research field of economic development. At the Carnegie Institute of Technology Hoselitz taught a course in international economics in 1947–48 that was the only economics course that future Nobel Laureate John Nash took before Nash wrote his pathbreaking thesis on game theory and bargaining.

== Biography ==
Hoselitz was born in 1913 in Vienna. He studied at the University of Vienna from 1932 to 1937, notably attending two seminars by Ludwig von Mises, and received a Doctor of Jurisprudence degree in 1936. Hoselitz was a member of the Austrian Social Democratic Labor Party between 1928 and 1938. He left Vienna when Nazi Germany annexed Austria in 1938, as did his father Bela and his brother Kurt. After attempting to go to China, he went to England. In 1942, Hoselitz's mother was murdered in the Auschwitz concentration camp. Through a U.S. Quaker organization, Bert Hoselitz found a position at Manchester College in Indiana and taught economics there in 1940–41. He then attended the University of Chicago, obtaining his master's degree in 1945. In 1943, he served as a research assistant for economist Jacob Viner at Yale. In 1945, he took a position as instructor in social sciences and then in 1946 as assistant professor of economics at the University of Chicago.

In 1947–48, he held an appointment as associate professor of economics at the Carnegie Institute of Technology. While there he taught a course in International Economics in which John Nash was a student. Nash indicates that it was the only course in economics he took before he began graduate study in mathematics at Princeton where he wrote his pathbreaking dissertation at Princeton on game theory and bargaining. Nash credits Hoselitz with influencing his thinking on bargaining with the example of countries negotiating and bargaining on tariffs.

Hoselitz went back to the University of Chicago in 1948. In 1951 he helped found the university's Research Center in Economic Development and Cultural Change and founded the center's journal Economic Development and Cultural Change. In 1953 he was promoted to Professor of Economics and the Social Sciences. Hoselitz served on and chaired a variety of interdisciplinary university committees. At Chicago he also supervised the doctoral thesis of radical economist Andre Gunder Frank, the founder of Dependency Theory. From 1952 to 1962 he took a variety of roles in international missions and conferences on development, and advised El Salvador, India, the U.S. Senate, and UNESCO. Hoselitz retired in 1978, becoming professor emeritus. He continued to edit Economic Development and Cultural Change until 1985 and died in 1995.

== Works ==
Hoselitz addressed topics in economic policy and intellectual history including the economics of war and military occupation, urbanization, stage theories of economic growth, and the entrepreneur. With James Dingwall, Hoselitz translated and edited the first English edition of Carl Menger's Principles of Economics' (1950), an important text in Austrian economics.

In the early 1950s, Hoselitz's work began to focus on the contrasts in social organization between economically advanced and economically backward countries. He wanted to develop a social science framework for examining the determinants of economic growth. The framework he developed drew heavily on the sociologist Talcott Parsons's theory of social structure, especially what Parsons called "pattern variables of role-definition".

Hoselitz made several distinctions between developed and underdeveloped countries based on these pattern variables: a) developed countries tend to be achievement-oriented, based on objective measures such as educational attainment, while developing countries have used ascribed status factors such as kinship and religion for assigning status and rewards; b) developed countries tend to use universalistic standards, for example in use of the rule of law, whereas developing countries tend more to act more on particularistic, personalized relationships such as caste systems or kinship networks; c) developed economies are characterized by extensive division of labor while developing economies tend to have a less-specialized workforce.

In linking together the two topics of economic development and cultural change, the founders and staff of the Center took the view that cooperative, interdisciplinary research would be required to address the relevant issues.

To facilitate "exploratory discussion of the problems of economic and cultural change", the Center sponsored publication of the journal Economic Development and Cultural Change. Its first issue appeared in March, 1952. Initially established as essentially a newsletter for the Center for Research on Economic Development and Cultural Change, it went on under Hoselitz's 33-year editorship to become one of the leading journals in the field of economic development. The journal focused on developing countries in the midst of on-going economic concerns with postwar reconstruction and emerging Cold War tensions. It was also distinctive among development journals in emphasizing application of social science and interdisciplinary perspectives rather than simple advocacy or ad hoc generalizations.

Hoselitz can be seen as a maverick and intellectual outsider to the Chicago Economics department, home of the "Chicago School" of thought. His employment of Parson's pattern variables and his focus on cultural change contrasted to the Chicago department's emphasis on universal maximizing behavior. Hoselitz's writings acknowledge the likely possibility that top-down planners will be required to direct the course of economic development for under-developed economies, in contrast to the Chicago department's usual preference for laissez faire policies.

Hoselitz worked effectively with "mainstream" members of the Economics department. D. Gale Johnson was one of the founding participants in the Center for Research on Economic Development and Cultural Change, and Johnson succeeded Hoselitz as editor of Economic Development and Cultural Change.

== Publications ==
- Henry Simon Bloch; Bert Hoselitz, (1944). The Economics of Military Occupation: Selected Problems (1st ed.). Foundation Press – via Internet Archive.. 2d enlarged edition, Chicago: University of Chicago Press.
- Bert Hoselitz (December 1945). "Professor Hayek on German Socialism". American Economic Review. 35 (5): 929–34. JSTOR 1812605.
- Menger, Carl (1950). Principles of Economics, First, General Part. Translated by Dingwall, James; Hoselitz, Bert F. Glencoe, Illinois: The Free Press.
- Bert Hoselitz, (1952), "Entrepreneurship and Economic Growth," American Journal of Economics and Sociology 12, no.1 (October): 97–110.
- Bert Hoselitz, (1952) "Non-economic Barriers to Economic Development" Economic Development and Cultural Change 1:1 (March 1952): 8–21.
- Bert F. Hoselitz, editor, (1952), The Progress of Underdeveloped Areas. Chicago: University of Chicago Press.
- Bert Hoselitz, (1953) "The Scope and History of Theories of Economic Growth" Revista de Economia Politica, Vol.5, No.1 (May, 1953): 9–28.
- Bert Hoselitz, (1953), "Social Structure and Economic Growth," Economia Internazionale, 6:3 (Aug. 1953): 52–77.
- Bert Hoselitz (1953) "The Role of Cities in the Economic Growth of Underdeveloped countries," Journal of Political Economy Vol. 61, No.3 (June, 1953): 195–208.
- Bert Hoselitz (1955) "Generative and Parasitic Cities" Economic Development and Cultural Change 3:3 (April, 1955): 278–94.
- Bert Hoselitz (1956) "Entrepreneurship and Capital Formation in France and Britain since 1700," in Capital Formation and Economic Growth, pp. 291–338. Princeton, N.J.: National Bureau for Economic Research.
- Bert Hoselitz (1957) "Urbanization and Economic Growth in Asia". Economic Development and Cultural Change 6:1 (October, 1957): 42–54.
- Bert F. Hoselitz, Sociological Aspects of Economic Growth, Glencoe, IL: Free Press, 1960. Includes most of Hoselitz's major papers since 1952, listed above.
- Bert F. Hoselitz, (1960) "Theories of Stages of Economic Growth," in Bert F. Hoselitz ed., Theories of Economic Growth. New York: The Free Press.
- Bert F. Hoselitz, (1961) "Tradition and Economic Growth" in Ralph Braibanti and Joseph J. Spengler eds. Tradition, Values, and Socio-Economic Development. Durham, NC: Duke University Press. London: Cambridge University Press. pp. 83–113.
- Bert F. Hoselitz (1963) "Main Concepts in the Analysis of the Social Implications of Technical Change" in Bert F. Hoselitz and Wilbert E. Moore eds. Industrialization and Society. UNESCO-Mouton. pp. 11–31.

== Bibliography ==
- Department of Economics Records, University of Chicago. Box 41, Folder 2. Special Collections Research Center. The University of Chicago Library.
- Klaus Herdzina (1999) entry on "Hoselitz, Bert(hold) Frank, in Harald Hagemann and Claus-Dieter Krohn editors, Biographisches Handbuch der deutschsprachigen wirtschaftswissenschaftlichen Emigration nach 1933. Band 1. Munchen: K.G. Saur.
- Yvan Kelly (2009) "Mises, Morgenstern, Hoselitz, and Nash: the Austrian Connection to Early Game Theory" The Quarterly Journal of Austrian Economics 12, no. 3: 37–42.
- David Mitch (2010) "Berthold Frank Hoselitz" in The Elgar Companion to the Chicago School of Economics edited by Ross B. Emmett, Cheltenham UK: Edward Elgar, pp. 274–279
- Alexander J. Morin. (1952). Editorial. Economic Development and Cultural Change. Vol.1, No.1 (March): 3–7.
- Sylvia Nasar. (1994). A Beautiful Mind: A Biography of John Forbes Nash, Jr., Winner of the Nobel Prize in Economics. Simon & Schuster. pp. 90–91. ISBN 0-684-81906-6
- Research Center in Economic Development and Cultural Change. 1952. "A Report to the Committee on Economic Growth. Social Science Research Council." In Bert F. Hoselitz papers, Box 4. Special Collections Research Center. The University of Chicago Library
- Talcott Parsons. 1951. The Social System. New York: Free Press.
