= Arghiri Emmanuel =

French economist

- Born: June 7, 1911; Patras, Greece
- Died: December 14, 2001 (aged 90); Paris, France
- Citizenship: Greek, French
- Known for: Theory of unequal exchange

Academic background
- Education: Athens University of Economics and Business, Athens University, École Pratique des Hautes Études
- Doctoral advisor: Charles Bettelheim

Academic work
- Institutions: University of Paris 1 Panthéon-Sorbonne

Arghiri Emmanuel (Greek: Αργύρης Εμμανουήλ; June 7, 1911 – December 14, 2001) was a Greek-French Marxian economist who became known in the 1960s and 1970s for his theory of unequal exchange.

== Biography ==
Emmanuel was born in Patras, Greece, the son of Charalambos Emmanuel and Katina (born Menounou). He studied at the Supreme School of Economic Commercial Sciences (today the Athens University of Economics and Business) from 1927 to 1932 and then at the School of Law of Athens University until 1934, from where he went on to work in commerce in Athens until 1937.

While his later works clearly identify him as a Marxist or communist of sorts, it is still uncertain when and under which circumstances he began considering himself as such. Publishing articles at least from 1928, an interest in Marxist philosophy is evidenced in a 1937 article on 'psychoanalysis as a global theory and dialectical materialism', and yet another on gold as an 'unwelcome immigrant' perhaps links to a long-standing concern with gold and the special economic role of the money commodity. No published record of membership in a communist party is familiar, but his later works identified him as a 'paleo-Marxist', both in the historical materialist sense and as a supporter of centralised economic planning, even on a global scale.

Changes in the American immigration policies closed the traditional Greek safety vault, and under the yoke of depression and General Metaxas's dictatorship (1936–1941), Emmanuel, in 1937, went to work in commerce in the Belgian Congo. In 1942, Emmanuel volunteered for the Greek Liberation Forces in the Middle East, and was active in the April 1944 left-wing uprising of the Middle Eastern forces against the Greek government-in-exile in Cairo. In fact, the uprising was not supported by EAM (National Liberation Front) and it was violently suppressed by British troops, with Emmanuel being sentenced to death by a Greek court-martial in Alexandria. The mutiny appears to have been directed more immediately against the return of the monarch, so that participation does not in itself suggest communist or Marxist leanings, rather than merely republican, although in Emmanuel's case this would seem probable.

By the end of 1945 he was pardoned and returned to the Belgian Congo, where there now had grown a small community of Greeks and Portuguese, in addition to the African and Belgian ones. Here, too, he participated in debates: on colonists and against the common accusation for illegitimate profits on behalf of colonial merchants (to whom Emmanuel and commonly other Greeks belonged). He may even have been in contact with the liberation movement to be organised around Lumumba in Stanleyville, but when the situation hardened in 1957, he departed for France. Observations from the Congos appear frequently in his writings and can probably help explain the peculiarity of his approach and its differences to common French Marxism. After some years as an art student, and in the context of the publication of Frantz Fanon's The Wretched of the Earth, Emmanuel began as a graduate student under Charles Bettelheim, the theme being his theory of unequal exchange which was first presented in 1961–1962.

While Bettelheim was certainly inspired by Paul A. Baran and Paul Sweezy, the same is not evident for Emmanuel. In addition, many other differences were visible from the start, such as Bettelheim's desire to make unequal exchange due to wage differentials a subcategory of unequal exchange due to differences in 'organic composition' (i.e. capital intensity), which was common enough to Marxist understanding and continues to be the focus of modern 'developments' of the theory of unequal exchange. This distinction was also the cause of some confusion when the theory was eventually debated in the Anglo-Saxon world in the 1970s (among non-Marxists, e.g., Paul Samuelson, David Evans).

== Theory of unequal exchange ==
The theory of unequal exchange was an attempt to explain the falling trend in the terms of trade for underdeveloped countries, while criticising the different approaches of Raúl Prebisch, Hans Singer, and Arthur Lewis to do so as only half-hearted attempts. It stated, contrary to the then conventional Heckscher-Ohlin-Samuelson theory, that it was politically and historically set wage-levels that determined relative prices, not the other way around, and, contrary to the assumptions of Ricardo's comparative costs, that capital was internationally mobile and the rate of profit correspondingly equalised.

What made the theory a heated subject in Marxist and dependency economics circles was the theory's implications about international worker solidarity. Emmanuel pointed out that his theory fitted well with the observed absence of such solidarity, particularly between high- and low-wage countries, and, in fact, made the nationally enclosed workers movements into the principal cause of unequal exchange.

By contrast, all subsequent versions of the theory such as those by Samir Amin, Oscar Braun, Jan Otto Andersson, Paul Antoine Delarue, and almost every critic since Charles Bettelheim, have preferred to make higher productivity the cause (and thereby justification) of higher wages, and 'monopolies' the cause of unequal exchange.

Emmanuel's theory of unequal exchange was part of a more comprehensive explanation of the post-war capitalist economy. In Emmanuel's view, because selling had to take place without the income generated by the sale itself, there was a permanent excess of (the value of) goods over (the purchasing power of) income in the normal workings of a market economy. This obliged the economy to function below its full potential and made it prone to crises such as the one he had himself experienced during the Great Depression. By contrast, the boom of the 'thirty glorious' post-war years indicated that this normal functioning had somehow been evaded, and Emmanuel now offered the institutionalised rise in wages, plus a policy of permanent inflation, as the principal stimulant directing the boom in investments. Since neither the wage- nor the consumption levels of the well-off countries could be internationally equalised — upwards for both ecological reasons and because it would eat up all profits, and downwards for political reasons in the same rich countries – unequal exchange was the necessary consequence, in a sense saving the capitalist economy from itself.

== Select bibliography ==
- Arghiri Emmanuel, 1962. "Échange inégal," in Emmanuel & Bettelheim 1962, pp. 1–32.
- 1964. "El intercambio desigual", Revue Economica, Havana, Feb.
- 1966a. "Le taux de profit et les incompatibilités Marx-Keynes." Annales, 21(6): 1189–1211.
- 1966b. "La Division internationale du travail et le commerce exterieur des pays socialistes," in idem, La Division internationale de travail et le marché socialiste, pp. 1–35. Also "Appendice", pp. 1–7. Problèmes de planification, No. 7, Sorbonne: Centre d'Étude de Planification Socialiste.
- 1966c. "Le Prix mondial et le marché international socialiste," in idem, La division internationale du travail et le marché socialiste, pp. 1–15. Problèmes de planification, No. 7, Sorbonne: Centre d'Étude de Planification Socialiste.
- 1969a. L'échange inégal: Essais sur les antagonismes dans les rapports économiques internationaux. Paris: François Maspero.
- 1969b. "Le Prolétariat des nations privilégiées participe à l'éxploitation du 'Tiers monde'." Le Monde, Supplément au numéro 7722, 11 Nov., p. iv.
- 1970a. "Démystifier les antagonismes entre les nations." Politique aujourd'hui, No. 1(Jan.): 78–94. (Trans. in Emmanuel 1972, Appendix IV, pp. 357–72, 378–83.)
- 1970b. "The Delusions of Internationalism." Monthly Review: An Independent Socialist Magazine, Vol. 22, No. 2(June): 13–19. Uncut trans. B. Pearce of Emmanuel 1969b; together with Bettelheim 1970 as "International Solidarity of Workers: Two Views".
- 1970c. "Échange inégal et dévéloppement inégal", Politique aujourd'hui, No. 11(Nov.): 75–90.
- 1970d. "La question de l'échange inégal", L'homme et la société, Vol. 18, No. 4, pp. 35–59. (Excepting introduction and ending [pp. 55–59], also in Emmanuel 1972a, "Appendix V: Some Keenly Contested Points", pp. 387–418.)
- 1972a. Unequal Exchange: A Study of the Imperialism of Trade. (Trans. of Emmanuel 1969a by B. Pearce.) New York & London: Monthly Review Press.
- 1972b. "White-Settler Colonialism and the Myth of Investment Imperialism." New Left Review, Vol. I, No. 73(May–June): 35–57. (Orig. in French as "Le colonialisme des "poor-whites" et le mythe de l'impérialisme d'investisement" in L'Homme et la société, No. 22, 1971; also in Emmanuel 1985, Ch. 1, pp. 1–43, including a debate with Suzanne de Brunhoff.)
- 1974a. Le profit et les crises. Paris: François Maspero et Cie.
- 1974b. "The Myths of Development versus 'Myths of Underdevelopment'." New Left Review, Vol. I, No. 85 (May–June): 61–82.
- 1975a. "Unequal Exchange Revisited." IDS Discussion Paper, No. 77, University of Sussex, Brighton.
- 1976., "The Multinational Corporations and Inequality of Development", International Social Science Journal 28(4): 754–765.
- 1977. "La contradiction interieure du mode de production socialiste." Socialism in the World (Belgrade, Tribune internationale etc.), No. 7: 108–111.
- 1978a. "Gains and Losses from the International Division of Labour." Review, Vol. 1, No. 2, pp. 87–108.
- 1978b. "A Note on 'Trade Pattern Reversals'." Journal of International Economics, 8: 143–145.
- 1979 (orig. 1977). "The State in the Transitional Period." New Left Review, Vol. I, Nos. 113-114 (January–April): 111–131.
- 1980. "Le 'prix rémunérateur': Épilogue à l'échange inégal." Revue Tiers-Monde, 21(81): 21–39.
- 1982 (orig. 1981). Appropriate or Underdeveloped Technology? (Trans. T. E. A. Benjamin.) Chichester, New York, Brisbane, Toronto, & Singapore: John Wiley & Sons.
- 1984. Profit and Crises. (Trans. of Emmanuel 1974a by N. P. Costello) New York: St. Martin's Press.
- 1985. La dynamique des inégalités. Paris: Éditions Anthropos.
- 1988. "Le Surcroit d'endettement des pays à monnaie internationale: ses limites et ses contradictions". Économies et Sociétés, Nos 30 (Juin-Juillet): 113–127.
- Arghiri Emmanuel & Charles Bettelheim, 1962. Échange inégal et politique de développement, Problèmes de planification, No. 2, Sorbonne: Centre d'Étude de Planification Socialiste.
- Arghiri Emmanuel, E. Somaini, L. Boggio, & M. Salvati, 1975 (orig. 1973). Un débat sur l'échange inégal: Salaires, sous-développement, impérialisme. Paris: François Maspero. (Trans. from the Italian [Salari, sottosviluppo, imperialismo, Giulio Einaudi editore, Turin 1973] by M. C. Paoletti & A. Benaneti.)

== Sources ==
- Brolin, John (2006). The Bias of the World: Theories of Unequal Exchange in History (PDF) (PhD dissertation). Sweden: Lund University. ISBN 978-91-628-7022-5.
