= Enzo Faletto =

Chilean sociologist and historian

- Born: Enzo Faletto Verne; July 14, 1935; Santiago, Chile
- Died: July 22, 2003 (aged 68); Santiago, Chile
- Education: University of Chile
- Occupations: University professor, writer, historian, sociologist
- Political party: Socialist Party of Chile

Enzo Doménico Faletto Verné (July 14, 1935 – June 22, 2003) was a Chilean sociologist and historian. Together with former Brazilian president and sociologist Fernando Henrique Cardoso, he wrote the book Dependency and Development in Latin America, an important contribution to the development of Dependency Theory.

== Biography ==
=== Early years and education ===
Born in the Chilean capital, Santiago, Faletto wanted to join the Foreign Legion. Frustrated about his chances of joining, at the age of 14 he entered the Arturo Prat Naval School, a branch of the Chilean Navy, located in Valparaíso. He was expelled from the corps for bad behavior and returned to Santiago to work in his father's armory.

He entered the History course at the University of Chile at the age of 20, where he graduated in 1957. After graduating in History, he moved to the Sociology department at Latin American Faculty of Social Sciences (FLACSO) to do her master's degree.

=== Career ===
In 1961, he joined the United Nations Economic Commission for Latin America and the Caribbean (ECLAC). With the establishment of the Brazilian military dictatorship in 1964, intellectuals such as Fernando Henrique Cardoso, Francisco Weffort and Vilmar Faria went into exile in Chile, where they met Faletto.

Cardoso and Faletto wrote the book Dependencia y desarrollo en América Latina, initially published by the Mexican publishing house Siglo XXI in 1969. The book was first published in Brazil by Zahar in Rio de Janeiro in 1970 under the title Dependência e Desenvolvimento na América Latina. A decade after its release in Mexico, the book was published in the United States by the University of California Press under the title Dependency and development in Latin America.

Between 1967 and 1972 Faletto taught sociology and journalism at the University of Chile. After the military coup in Chile in 1973, he was relieved of his duties as a university professor. During the dictatorship of General Augusto Pinochet, he worked as a researcher at FLACSO. It wasn't until the country's re-democratization in 1991 that he was reinstated as a professor at the University of Chile, he worked there until the end of his life, particularly in the sociology department. With a left-wing orientation, he was affiliated until the end of his life to the Socialist Party of Chile.

For his academic achievements, he received the title of honorary professor at the University of Chile, as well as the Valentin Letelier medal, also awarded by the university. In Argentina, he was awarded an honorary doctorate by the National University of Rosario.

=== Death ===
He died in Santiago on June 22, 2003 at the age of 67 from lung cancer.

== Publications (selection) ==
- Dimensiones Sociales, Políticas y Culturales del Desarrollo: Antologia. (Social, political and cultural dimensions of development: Anthology), Santiago: FLACSO-Chile, 2007.
- Como enfrentar la pobreza?: estrategias y experiencias organizacionales innovadoras. (How to confront poverty? Innovative organizational strategies and experiences), Buenos Aires: Grupo Editor Latinoamericano, 1989.
- Clases sociales y opciones políticas en Chile. (Social classes and political options in Chile), Santiago: FLACSO-Chile, 1981.
- Movimientos populares y alternativa de poder en Latinoamérica (People´s movements and power alternatives in Latin America) Mexico: Editorial Universidad Autónoma de Puebla, 1980.
- Dependency and development in Latin America (with Fernando Henrique Cardoso). Berkeley: University of California Press, 1979.
- Sociedad burguesa y liberalismo romántico. (Society of the middle class and romantic liberalism) Caracas: El Cid Editor, 1977.
