= Balanced trade =

Alternative to free trade

Balanced trade is an alternative economic model to free trade. Under balanced trade, nations are required to provide a fairly even reciprocal trade pattern; they cannot run large trade deficits or trade surpluses. The concept was introduced by Michael McKeever Sr. of the McKeever Institute of Economic Policy Analysis in 1996.

== History ==
The concept of balanced trade arises from a 1996 essay by Michael McKeever Sr. of the McKeever Institute of Economic Policy Analysis. According to the essay, "BT is a simple concept which says that a country should import only as much as it exports so that trade and money flows are balanced. A country can balance its trade either on a trading partner basis in which total money flows between two countries are equalized or it can balance the overall trade and money flows so that a trade deficit with one country is balanced by a trade surplus with another country."

A form of balanced trade was hinted at by William Hawkins in 2002, who advocated direct limitations on imports: "the Bush Administration should be taking direct measures to reduce the trade deficit – which means limiting imports, both to defend the dollar's integrity and America's economic strength."

Balanced trade, as a concept, was suggested by Warren Buffett in a November 2003 Fortune Magazine article. Therein he proposed a system of "Import Certificates" (ICs) – exporters would receive $1 of ICs for each $1 of goods they exported, and importers would be required to present $1 of ICs for every $1 of goods they import. This would limit the value of imports to at most the value of exports (and presumably exactly the value of imports, assuming no leakage), and create a market of exporters to sell ICs to importers, effectively subsidizing exporters and taxing importers – compare cap and trade.

A more extensive argument for balanced trade, and a program to achieve balanced trade is presented by Raymond Richman, Howard Richman and Jesse Richman. In their 2008 book Trading Away Our Future, they argue "A minimum standard for ensuring that trade does benefit all is that trade should be relatively in balance." The Richmans published another book in 2014, Balanced Trade: Ending the Unbearable Costs of America's Trade Deficits, in which they propose a "scaled tariff…be applied to all imported goods from trade surplus countries that have had a sizable trade surplus with the United States over the most recent four economic quarters. The tariff rate would be designed to take in a portion (e.g. 50%) of the bilateral trade deficit (goods plus services) as revenue."

Another advocate of balanced trade is Kenneth Davis Jr, former Assistant Secretary of Commerce and former vice president and Chief Financial Officer for IBM Inc. In 2014 Davis and Will Wilkin formed Balanced Trade Associates to advocate for a balanced trade policy in the United States. They drafted model legislation, the Balanced Trade Restoration Act of 2014, that would use an electronic form of Import certificates to taper down imports 10% each year for 3 years, then, beginning in the 4th year, limit imports each year to the same value as the previous year's exports.

The goal of balanced trade is also advanced by Mike Stumo, CEO of the Coalition for a Prosperous America (CPA). CPA has initiated a petition requesting that "Congress adopt balanced trade as the primary national trade goal by adding the following language to future trade-related bills: 'The principal national objective for trade in goods, services and agriculture is to achieve an overall balance of payments over a reasonable period of time, eliminate persistent trade deficits and reverse the accumulation of foreign debt.'"

In an interview with Tucker Carlson, Robert Lighthizer said his views had evolved from free trade to fair trade to balanced trade.

== See also ==
- Fair trade
- Unequal exchange
