= Ruy Mauro Marini =

Brazilian economist and sociologist (1932–1997)

Ruy Mauro de Araújo Marini (May 2, 1932 – July 5, 1997) was a Brazilian economist and sociologist. Marini is internationally known as one of the creators of dependency theory, Super-exploitation, and Unequal exchange. He is the author of the work "Dialéctica de la Dependencia" (Dialectic of Dependency), in which, using elements of the theory of economic development of Karl Marx adapted to the study of Latin American reality, he explains the necessity of overcoming the developmentalism of ECLAC. He was an activist of the Revolutionary Left Movement of Chile, becoming a member of the Central Community in 1972 and director of his theoretical journal Marxismo y Revolución.

== Personal life ==
Born in Barbacena, Minas Gerais, he arrived in the city of Rio de Janeiro to study preparatory courses for medicine; however, he preferred personal independence, so he chose to dedicate himself to public service. In 1953, he enrolled at the National Faculty of Law, but he did not manage to complete his student at the Federal University of Rio de Janeiro. He began studying Public Administration at the Brazilian School of Public and Business Administration and graduated in 1957. During this period, he participated intensely in the student movement, becoming editor of the student newspaper. He founded Política Operária (POLOP) with Moniz Bandeira and Theotônio dos Santos, a left-wing political organization against the guidelines of the Brazilian Communist Party. In 1962, he was invited by Darcy Ribeiro to become professor at the University of Brasília, where he served as auxiliary professor until he was removed from office by the military dictatorship.

He died from cancer in 1997 in Rio de Janeiro at the age of 65.

== Bibliography ==
- Ruy Mauro Marini; Márgara Millán (1994). La teoría social latinoamericana: Cuestiones contemporáneas. UNAM. ISBN 978-968-6125-83-2.
- Ruy Mauro Marini (2007). Proceso y tendencias de la globalización capitalista y otros textos (Antología). Prometeo Libros Editorial. ISBN 978-987-574-170-6.
- Marini, Ruy Mauro (2022) The Dialectics of Dependency Trans. and Introduction Latimer, Amanda Monthly Review Press, New York.
