= Import certificates =

Proposal to eliminate US trade deficit

Import certificates are a proposed mechanism to implement balanced trade, and eliminate a country's trade deficit. The idea was proposed by Warren Buffett in 2003 to address the U.S. trade deficit. In the United States, the idea was first introduced legislatively in the Balanced Trade Restoration Act of 2006. The proposed legislation was sponsored by Senators Byron Dorgan (ND) and Russell Feingold (WI), two Democrats in the United States senate. Since then there has been no action on the bill.

== Concept ==
Buffett's plan proposes creating a market for transferable import certificates, (ICs) that would represent the right to import a certain dollar amount of goods into the United States. These transferable ICs would be issued to US exporters in an amount equal to the dollar amount of the goods they export and they could only be utilized once. They could be sold or traded to importers, who must purchase them in order to legally import goods into the USA. The price of ICs are set by (free-market) forces, and are therefore dependent on the balance between entrepreneurs' willingness to pay the ICs market price for importing goods into the USA and the global volume of goods exported from the USA, (i.e. supply and demand).

Proceeds from the sale of ICs would encourage exporters (who would gain that extra money in addition to the proceeds of their exports) and discourage importers (who would need to pay the additional cost to acquire ICs as well as the cost to acquire the goods they are importing). This system would essentially create a broad-based tariff on imports to the United States, and subsidy for exports – compare cap and trade, which creates a similar market in pollution.

Many who are aware of the ”Balanced Trade Restoration Act of 2006” text find it has faults that could have been easily corrected:

- They regret that assessments would not be adjusted to exclude the value of specifically listed scarce or precious minerals integral to the goods being assessed. We should discourage the export of cast gold paper weights encrusted with gems in order to facilitate importing high-tech or labor intensive goods. This fault could severely undermine the bill’s economic benefit to our nation.
- Natural gas and oil should have also been included in such a scarce or precious minerals list. The proposal itself should not favor the export or inhibit the import of such scarce minerals. (The original U.S. Senate draft temporarily (for only 5 years) excluded the entire value of goods containing petroleum).
- The act should be self-funding. Only those exporters of goods from the USA who choose to pay fees that would fund all of the act’s entire net expenses should have their goods assessed and receive the transferable ICs based upon that assessment. Exporter’s potential profits would motivate them to pay those fees.

== Import Certificate prices are market rather than government driven ==
The Import Certificate (IC) market price (per dollar of face value) is eventually an additional cost to USA purchasers’ of foreign goods. The IC price is directly dependent upon the USA’s purchasers’ aggregate willingness to pay additionally for foreign goods.

Differences between exporters of USA goods expenses for dealing with ICs and the IC prices are additional revenues to the exporters that would induce lesser prices of USA goods to foreign purchasers; (i.e. an induced price reduction of USA goods to foreign purchasers which in turn induces increasing USA exports of goods). This proposal would increase the aggregate sum of USA’s imports plus exports more than otherwise.

Under this proposal to the extents that USA purchasers willingness to pay additionally for foreign goods indirectly induces increasing USA exports of goods, or USA’s purchasers refraining from paying such additional costs indirectly induces increased USA production to satisfy Our domestic want of goods, will in both instances reduce our trade deficit and bolster our GDP more than otherwise.

Buffett argues that the concept is of little value to a nation which maintains a trade surplus of goods. Conceivably under this proposal USA’s economy could improve to the point that demand for USA goods abroad closely approaches or exceeds the demand for foreign goods within USA’s domestic market. In such an environment the open market value of ICs wouldn’t be worth much more than the expense of their acquisition.

It’s been suggested that during such favorable conditions the government by executive-congressional agreement, (by CEA) could for a limited duration of months or subject to presidential termination, waive the requirement that importers surrender ICs. There are precedence’s’ for CEAs.
