= Economic Development and Cultural Change =

- Discipline: Economics, culture
- Language: English
- Edited by: Marcel Fafchamps

Publication details
- History: 1952–present
- Publisher: University of Chicago Press (United States)
- Frequency: Quarterly
- Impact factor: 1.188 (2017)

Standard abbreviations
- ISO 4: Econ. Dev. Cult. Change

Indexing
- CODEN: EDCCAF
- ISSN: 0013-0079 (print); 1539-2988 (web)
- LCCN: 56015874
- JSTOR: 00130079
- OCLC no.: 1567393

Links
- Journal homepage

Economic Development and Cultural Change (EDCC) is a peer-reviewed journal that publishes studies that use modern theoretical and empirical approaches to examine both the determinants and the effects of various dimensions of economic development and cultural change. It covers all aspects of the economics of developing countries, including education reform, immigration, debt bondage, ethnicity, land redistribution, and economic development and cultural change. EDCC's focus is on empirical papers with analytic underpinnings, concentrating on micro-level evidence, that use appropriate data to test theoretical models and explore policy impacts related to economic development.

The major founder of the journal was Bert F. Hoselitz who served as editor from 1952 until 1985. The journal was established at the University of Chicago's Center for Research on Economic Development and Cultural Change. The center's board and the journal's founders took the view that interdisciplinary research would be required to understand issues of economic development.
