= Kunibert Raffer =

Professor Kunibert Raffer (born 1951) is a development researcher. His main contributions are on international economic relations and the problems of unequal exchange. From 1979–1980 he was Associate Professor of Economics at the University of Vienna and from 1983–84 consultant to UNIDO. He was a visiting lecturer (1986–89) at the University of Klagenfurt and then Visiting Fellow of the Institute of Development Studies (IDS) at the University of Sussex. He spent 1990–93 as honorary research fellow, Department of Commerce, University of Birmingham and in 1998 participated in the UNDP's research project "International Development Cooperation and Global Public Goods". Since 2002 he has been Senior Associate of the New Economics Foundation (London), with a winter term (002-03) as visiting Professor at the Centre for the Study of International Institutions (CSI), SOWI Faculty, University of Innsbruck.

His articles on Chapter 11 of US Title 11 (Bankruptcy) in the context of the problem of sovereignty created a veritable flood of international reactions. In 1987 Raffer proposed to internationalise the basic features of the US Chapter 9, maintaining that its essential points can be applied to sovereign borrowers immediately and without problems. There were numerous academic responses.

== International reception ==
Raffer was given the opportunity to discuss his ideas with Members of the European Parliament on 7 December 2005 as a guest speaker at the Workshop on the International Monetary Fund in Brussels, and on 9 June 1992 at a Roundtable with MPs on international insolvency at Strasbourg. In the US, Raffer's proposal was incorporated into the "Global Development Resolution", initiated by Rep. Bernie Sanders (for the 106th Congress, 1st Session). Other legislative assemblies, reciting to Raffer's proposals, were the Argentine Parliament in Buenos Aires, the Uruguayan Parliament (Palacio Legislativo), and the Indonesian Parliament in Jakarta. On 18 March 1999, Raffer was invited to present his ideas at a consultative meeting between the international Jubilee 2000 campaign, representatives of the G-7 governments and the Bretton Woods institutions on developing countries' debts in London.

== Major publications ==
- The economic north–south divide six decades of unequal development. Singer, Hans Wolfgang: Cheltenham, UK; Northampton, MA, US : Edward Elgar, 2001
- The foreign aid business: economic assistance and development co-operation. Singer, H. W: Cheltenham, UK; Brookfield, Vt., US : E. Elgar, 1996
- Unequal exchange and the evolution of the world system: reconsidering the impact of trade on north–south relations. New York : St. Martin's Press, 1987
- Reinforcing divergence between North and South : unequal exchange and the WTO framework. Journal für Entwicklungspolitik, ISSN 0258-2384, Bd. 21 (2005), 4, S.6-24
- Applying musgrave's branches of government expenditures to ODA : tentative estimates. Journal für Entwicklungspolitik, ISSN 0258-2384, Bd. 20 (2004), 1, S.104-118
