= Super-exploitation =

Super-exploitation is one of the key Marxist concepts, developed by Marxist dependency theorists, of the impact of imperialism on nations and regions of 'the periphery', also widely categorised as the 'Global South' in contrast to the Imperialist 'core' or metropolitan countries in which Capital historically accumulates. Unequal exchange between countries and regions is another concept to which is attributed the actualising of the continuing wealth transfer from periphery to core, and is frequently linked in the associated theoretical discussions.

Super-exploitation is the systemic condition where labour power is employed at rates, and under conditions, below the general levels of remuneration, or value, such that ordinary expectations of quality of life, life expectancy are systemically limited or threatened.

These have in the past been contentious topics among Marxists – partly because in Karl Marx's Das Kapital, for analytic purposes, he explicitly assumed for the development of his initial abstractions that Labour was remunerated at its general social average value, sufficient for the worker's necessary means of social reproduction. Marx himself however frequently commented on exceptions to this, and documented many recorded instances when this was not the case, particularly in the employment of women and children, exploitation of slaves, and indigenous populations in colonial situations.

Marx indicated the importance of these effects without fully integrating their consideration in his published work, and the consequent observation and debate around these questions has its own history.
