= Dependency theory =

International relations theory

Dependency theory is the idea that resources flow from a "periphery" of poor and exploited states to a "core" of wealthy states, enriching the latter at the expense of the former. A central contention of dependency theory is that poor states are impoverished and rich ones enriched by the way poor states are integrated into the "world system". This theory was officially developed in the late 1940s following World War II, as scholars searched for the root issue in the lack of development in Latin America.

The theory arose as a reaction to modernization theory, an earlier theory of development which held that all societies progress through similar stages of development, that today's underdeveloped areas are thus in a similar situation to that of today's developed areas at some time in the past, and that, therefore, the task of helping the underdeveloped areas out of poverty is to accelerate them along this supposed common path of development, by various means such as investment, technology transfers, and closer integration into the world market. Dependency theory rejected this view, arguing that underdeveloped countries are not merely primitive versions of developed countries, but have unique features and structures of their own; and, importantly, are in the situation of being the weaker members in a world market economy.

Some writers have argued for its continuing relevance as a conceptual orientation to the global division of wealth. Dependency theorists can typically be divided into two categories: liberal reformists and neo-Marxists. Liberal reformists typically advocate for targeted policy interventions, while the neo-Marxists propose a planned economy.

== Basics ==
The premises of dependency theory are that:

1. Poor nations provide natural resources, cheap labour, a destination for obsolete technology, and markets for developed nations, without which the latter could not have the standard of living they enjoy.
2. Wealthy nations actively perpetuate a state of dependence by various means. This influence may be multifaceted, involving economics, media control, politics, banking and finance, education, culture, and sport.

== History ==
Dependency theory originates with two papers published in 1949, one by Hans Singer and one by Raúl Prebisch, in which the authors observe that the terms of trade for underdeveloped countries relative to the developed countries had deteriorated over time: the underdeveloped countries were able to purchase fewer and fewer manufactured goods from the developed countries in exchange for a given quantity of their raw materials exports. This idea is known as the Prebisch–Singer thesis. Prebisch, an Argentine economist at the United Nations Commission for Latin America (UNCLA), went on to conclude that the underdeveloped nations must employ some degree of protectionism in trade if they were to enter a self-sustaining development path. He argued that import-substitution industrialisation (ISI), not a trade-and-export orientation, was the best strategy for underdeveloped countries. The theory was developed from a Marxian perspective by Paul A. Baran in 1957 with the publication of his The Political Economy of Growth. Dependency theory shares many points with earlier, Marxist, theories of imperialism by Rosa Luxemburg and Vladimir Lenin, and has attracted continued interest from Marxists. Some authors identify two main streams in dependency theory: the Latin American Structuralist, typified by the work of Prebisch, Celso Furtado, and Aníbal Pinto at the United Nations Economic Commission for Latin America (ECLAC, or, in Spanish, CEPAL); and the American Marxist, developed by Paul A. Baran, Paul Sweezy, and Andre Gunder Frank.

Using the Latin American dependency model, the Guyanese Marxist historian Walter Rodney, in his book How Europe Underdeveloped Africa, described in 1972 an Africa that had been consciously exploited by European imperialists, leading directly to the modern underdevelopment of most of the continent.

The theory was popular in the 1960s and 1970s as a criticism of modernization theory, which was falling increasingly out of favor because of continued widespread poverty in much of the world. At that time the assumptions of liberal theories of development were under attack. It was used to explain the causes of overurbanization, a theory that urbanization rates outpaced industrial growth in several developing countries.

The Latin American Structuralist and the American Marxist schools had significant differences but, according to economist Matias Vernengo, they agreed on some basic points:

[B]oth groups would agree that at the core of the dependency relation between center and periphery lays [lies] the inability of the periphery to develop an autonomous and dynamic process of technological innovation. Technology – the Promethean force unleashed by the Industrial Revolution – is at the center of stage. The Center countries controlled the technology and the systems for generating technology. Foreign capital could not solve the problem, since it only led to limited transmission of technology, but not the process of innovation itself. Baran and others frequently spoke of the international division of labour – skilled workers in the center; unskilled in the periphery – when discussing key features of dependency.

Baran placed surplus extraction and capital accumulation at the center of his analysis. Development depends on a population's producing more than it needs for bare subsistence (a surplus). Further, some of that surplus must be used for capital accumulation – the purchase of new means of production – if development is to occur; spending the surplus on things like luxury consumption does not produce development. Baran noted two predominant kinds of economic activity in poor countries. In the older of the two, plantation agriculture, which originated in colonial times, most of the surplus goes to the landowners, who use it to emulate the consumption patterns of wealthy people in the developed world; much of it thus goes to purchase foreign-produced luxury items –automobiles, clothes, etc. – and little is accumulated for investing in development. The more recent kind of economic activity in the periphery is industry—but of a particular kind. It is usually carried out by foreigners, although often in conjunction with local interests. It is often under special tariff protection or other government concessions. The surplus from this production mostly goes to two places: part of it is sent back to the foreign shareholders as profit; the other part is spent on conspicuous consumption in a similar fashion to that of the plantation aristocracy. Again, little is used for development. Baran thought that political revolution was necessary to break this pattern.

In the 1960s, members of the Latin American Structuralist school argued that there is more latitude in the system than the Marxists believed. They argued that it allows for partial development or "dependent development"–development, but still under the control of outside decision makers. They cited the partly successful attempts at industrialisation in Latin America around that time (Argentina, Brazil, Mexico) as evidence for this hypothesis. They were led to the position that dependency is not a relation between commodity exporters and industrialised countries, but between countries with different degrees of industrialisation. In their approach, there is a distinction made between the economic and political spheres: economically, one may be developed or underdeveloped; but even if (somewhat) economically developed, one may be politically autonomous or dependent. More recently, Guillermo O'Donnell has argued that constraints placed on development by neoliberalism were lifted by the military coups in Latin America that came to promote development in authoritarian guise (O'Donnell, 1982).

These positions particularly in regard of Latin America were notably challenged theoretically in the work and teaching of Ruy Mauro Marini who developed wider recognition for a specifically Marxist Dependency Theory, after close reading of Marx, that super-exploitation and unequal exchange characteristically arose out of the specific forms in the capital reproduction of dependency, and the specific class relations particular to that dependency in the periphery.

The importance of multinational corporations and state promotion of technology were emphasised by the Latin American Structuralists.

Fajnzylber has made a distinction between systemic or authentic competitiveness, which is the ability to compete based on higher productivity, and spurious competitiveness, which is based on low wages.

The third-world debt crisis of the 1980s and continued stagnation in Africa and Latin America in the 1990s caused some doubt as to the feasibility or desirability of "dependent development".

The sine qua non of the dependency relationship is not the difference in technological sophistication, as traditional dependency theorists believe, but rather the difference in financial strength between core and peripheral countries–particularly the inability of peripheral countries to borrow in their own currency. He believes that the hegemonic position of the United States is very strong because of the importance of its financial markets and because it controls the international reserve currency – the US dollar. He believes that the end of the Bretton Woods international financial agreements in the early 1970s considerably strengthened the United States' position because it removed some constraints on their financial actions.

"Standard" dependency theory differs from Marxism, in arguing against internationalism and any hope of progress in less developed nations towards industrialization and a liberating revolution. Theotonio dos Santos described a "new dependency", which focused on both the internal and external relations of less-developed countries of the periphery, derived from a Marxian analysis. Former Brazilian President Fernando Henrique Cardoso (in office 1995–2002) wrote extensively on dependency theory while in political exile during the 1960s, arguing that it was an approach to studying the economic disparities between the centre and periphery. Cardoso summarized his version of dependency theory as follows:

- there is a financial and technological penetration by the developed capitalist centers of the countries of the periphery and semi-periphery;
- this produces an unbalanced economic structure both within the peripheral societies and between them and the centers;
- this leads to limitations on self-sustained growth in the periphery;
- this favors the appearance of specific patterns of class relations;
- these require modifications in the role of the state to guarantee both the functioning of the economy and the political articulation of a society, which contains, within itself, foci of inarticulateness and structural imbalance.

With the economic growth of India and some East Asian economies, dependency theory has lost some of its former influence. It still influences some NGO campaigns, such as Make Poverty History and the fair trade movement.

== Other theorists and related theories ==
Two other early writers relevant to dependency theory were François Perroux and Kurt Rothschild. Other leading dependency theorists include Herb Addo, Walden Bello, Ruy Mauro Marini, Enzo Faletto, Armando Cordova, Ernest Feder, Pablo González Casanova, Keith Griffin, Kunibert Raffer, Paul Israel Singer, Walter Rodney and Osvaldo Sunkel. Many of these authors focused their attention on Latin America; dependency theory in the Arab world was primarily refined by the Egyptian economist Samir Amin.

The American sociologist Immanuel Wallerstein refined the Marxist aspect of the theory and expanded on it, to form world-systems theory. World-systems theory (WST) and aligns closely with the idea of the "rich get richer and the poor get poorer". Wallerstein states that the poor and peripheral nations continue to get more poor as the developed core nations use their resources to become richer. Wallerstein developed WST utilizing the dependence theory along with the ideas of Marx and the Annales School. This theory postulates a third category of countries, the semi-periphery, intermediate between the core and periphery. Wallerstein believed in a tri-modal rather than a bi-modal system, as many nations are not distinctly developed or peripheral; he proposed the idea of a semi-periphery as an in between state within his model.

== Examples of dependency theory ==
Between 1650 and 1900, European nation(s) such as Britain and France colonized other nations, using advantages in naval and military technology for conquest. They developed economic systems in the Americas, Africa, and Asia to export natural materials from their lands into Europe. European countries made products with these materials, then sent them back to colonized parts of the Americas, Africa, and Asia for sale. This resulted in the transfer of wealth from these regions to Europe: in taking control of the materials, production, and distribution, European states depleted the resources of other nations while profiting from their exploitation.

Some scholars and politicians claim that with the decline of colonialism, dependency has been erased. Other scholars argue that some nations such as the United States and China still wield global power, which forces smaller nations to rely on them for military aid and economic investments.

Dependency theory shows that underdevelopment in Ghana emanated from the forceful integration of its economy into the capitalist system via colonialism, which positioned it as a supplier of raw materials and labour dependent on European products.

== Criticism ==
Dependency theory has been criticised for its conceptual ambiguity and limitations in explaining "underdevelopment".Economist Sanjaya Lall argued that the concept of economic dependence lacked clear grouping for separating dependent economies from other capitalist economies. He maintained that dependency theorist had not sufficiently demonstrated that dependence itself, rather than broader characteristics of capitalism, explained differences in economic development.Lall also questioned whether conclusion(s) drawn from particular cases of underdevelopment could be generalised across countries.

The improvement of India's economy after it moved from state-controlled business to open trade is commonly cited as evidence against dependency theory: much of its economic growth originated from outsourcing. This suggests that the relationship between core and peripheral states might not be inherently hostile and extractive.

Political scientist Tony Smith criticised dependency theory for focusing too much on international economic structures and not enough on political autonomy of developing countries. Drawing on historical examples such India, Smith said differences in state institutions and governments' capacity to mobilise domestic resources explain some variations in economic development. He criticises the idea that "a country's position within the international capitalist system determines its development path" (emphasis added) because it assumes domestic political agency is not relevant.

However, Indian economists Utsa Patnaik and Prabhat Patnaik argue that rather than a clear counter example to dependency theory, this may be due to the development of a globalized reserve workforce and changes in imperialism's presentation.

Furthermore, Sajid Iqbal, a professor of international relations, suggests that Pakistan - which has lagged behind India in economic growth - serves as a contrast to India's economic success that can be best understood with dependency theory.

In Africa, states that have emphasized import-substitution development, such as Zimbabwe, have typically been among the worst performers. Meanwhile, the continent's most successful non-oil based economies, such as Egypt, South Africa, and Tunisia, have pursued trade-based development.

It would be wrong to present Ghana as simply a passive "victim" of core countries when dependency theory is applied correctly and reveals Ghana's vulnerability to commodity-export dependencies, foreign borrowing and volatile international financial markets.

According to economic historian Robert C. Allen, dependency theory's claims are "debatable" due to fact that the protectionism that was implemented in Latin America as a solution ended up failing: the countries incurred too much debt and Latin America went into a recession.

One issue was that the national markets of the Latin American countries were too small to efficiently produce complex industrialized goods, such as automobiles.

== Aid dependency ==
Many nations have been affected negatively by the outcomes described by dependency theory; a nation depending upon another, and being exploited in the process, is common. Aid dependency is perpetuated via global capitalism and financialization. The peripheral (less-developed) nations become so indebted to the core (more-developed) nations that it becomes impossible to repay their debts, indefinitely prolonging or even deepening the dependency. More specifically, aid dependency refers to the proportion of government spending that is given by foreign donors: a proportion greater than 15% is correlated with negative outcomes for the recipient nation. This level of dependency can facilitate domestic underinvestment, inhibiting development and leading to political or economic policies which use foreign aid as a long-term solution to poverty. Aid dependency is most common today in Africa.

=== Instilling aid dependency ===
International development aid became widely popularized after World War II; first-world countries sought to create a more open economy and Cold War competition. In 1970, the United Nations set a target of 0.7% of gross national income per country as a recommended level of international aid. In his book Ending Aid Dependence, Yash Tandon describes how organizations like the International Monetary Fund (IMF) and the World Bank (WB) drove many sub-Saharan African countries into dependency with an influx of aid money during the economic crises in the 1980s and the 1990s, undermining their economic independence and self-direction.

In 2001, Benjamin W. Mkapa, President of Tanzania, noted that "Mr. Koehler and Mr. Wolfensohn have written in the International Herald Tribune arguing the case for really speeding [the] opening up of the OECD markets to products from sub-Saharan Africa... We would earn so much more than we are possibly getting by bilateral aid if those markets were just open to us... They put it around $100 billion per year," compared to "asking every day for a dollar here, a dollar there in bilateral aid." He cited a simultaneous need for "the resources with which to undertake modernization... protection [from global powers]... [and] access to the more developed markets."

While it is commonly believed that foreign aid is motivated by altruism, substantial evidence indicates that strategic, political, and military interests of donors are driving forces behind aid. This includes an intentional inculcation of domestic economic dependency on foreign aid, establishing leverage for foreign political intervention; McKinlay and Little found that US aid allocation can be best modeled with an imperialist framework. British and French aid is given to former colonies, and to countries in which they have significant investment interest and strong trade relations.

=== Stunted economic growth ===
A primary concern about foreign aid is that citizens benefiting from aid may lose motivation to work. Some will deliberately work less, seeking a lower income in order to qualify for aid provision. Aid-dependent countries are considered less likely to make economic progress or improve living standards, potentially leading to long-term lack of self-sufficiency or GDP growth and reinforcing the cycle of dependency. Food aid has been particularly criticized for its damage to a local economy; a high dependency on these imports leads to a decline in domestic demand, resulting in the stagnation of the agricultural industries of the least-developed countries. In the future, when aid is decreased, this under-development leaves fragile and inadequate industries incapable of serving citizens. This occurred in Haiti, where 80% of their grain stocks come from the United States even after a large decrease in aid. In countries where there is a primary-product dependency on an imported aid, such as wheat, foreign economic shocks can push the country into a local economic crisis.

=== Political dependency ===
Political dependency occurs when foreign donors - such as other countries or international organizations - have undue influence on the governance of a recipient country. The country's government is forced to privilege its source of funding, decreasing its effectiveness, accountability, and democratic quality. Corruptibility increases, inhibiting governance reform and skewing national self-direction. Political dependency can be significantly more challenging in nations where political corruption or civil rights violations are already common. For example, the Democratic Republic of the Congo - one of the most aid-dependent African countries - has undergone political turmoil, civil war, and regime change in its development.

Because aid dependence shifts state accountability away from the public and towards donors, a self-destructive presidentialism can arise. In a democracy, budgets and public investment plans are to be approved by parliament or legislature; aid-driven presidentialism can enable foreign donors to fund projects outside of this budget process, and therefore go without parliament review. Since open discussion of taxation and use of revenues are important for democratic health, this undermines accountability by subverting a distributed power of the purse.

=== Corruption and anti-corruption ===
Aid-dependent countries tend to rank more highly on corruption indexes than economically independent nations. Free cash flow provided to corrupt governments from foreign sources facilitates rent-seeking dynamics via sinecures, bid-rigging, kickbacks, and unaccountable leaders. Corruption works against economic growth and political development, trapping impoverished and isolated countries in cycles of violence, exploitation, and political manipulation.

During the Obama administration, Congress claimed that the anti-corruption criteria the Millennium Challenge Corporation (MCC) used were too lenient, obstructing efforts to decrease aid dependence.

=== Efforts to end aid dependency ===
Since 2000, aid dependency has decreased by about one third. This can be seen in countries like Ghana, whose aid dependency decreased from 47% to 27%, and in Mozambique, where aid dependency decreased from 74% to 58%. To decrease aid dependency, local governments can invest in areas such as job creation, regional integration, and economic integration. Long-term investment in agriculture and infrastructure are also key, as they allow a country to gradually decrease a dependency on foreign food assistance and develop its own agricultural systems to address food insecurity.

=== Other methods of aid ===
Foreign aid can prove useful in the long run, when directed towards the appropriate sector and managed accordingly. Specific pairings between organizations and donors with similar goals has produced more success in decreasing dependency than the traditional form of international aid, which involves government to government communication. Botswana is a successful example of this. The country first began receiving aid in 1966; however, Botswana selected specific areas in need of aid and found suitable donors for these aims, rather than accepting aid from foreign governments which earmarked their allocation. Recipient-led cases such as Botswana are more effective in part because when a recipient country maintains control of fund allocation, it can more appropriately determine its most productive applications than a foreign government might. This can also circumvent an altruistic donor's desire to report flattering data on the short-term, first-order efficiency of their programs, focusing instead on long-term growth and development of critical social functions such as infrastructure, education, and job development.

== See also ==
- Causes of poverty
- Chicago Boys
- Corporatocracy
- Cycle of poverty
- Distribution of wealth
- Golden billion
- Hierarchy theory
- Neocolonialism
- North–South model
- Structural adjustment
- Structuralist economics
- The Shock Doctrine, by Naomi Klein
- Third Space Theory
- Uneven and combined development
- Western Hemisphere Institute for Security Cooperation
- World-systems theory
