= Unequal exchange =

Term in Marxist economics

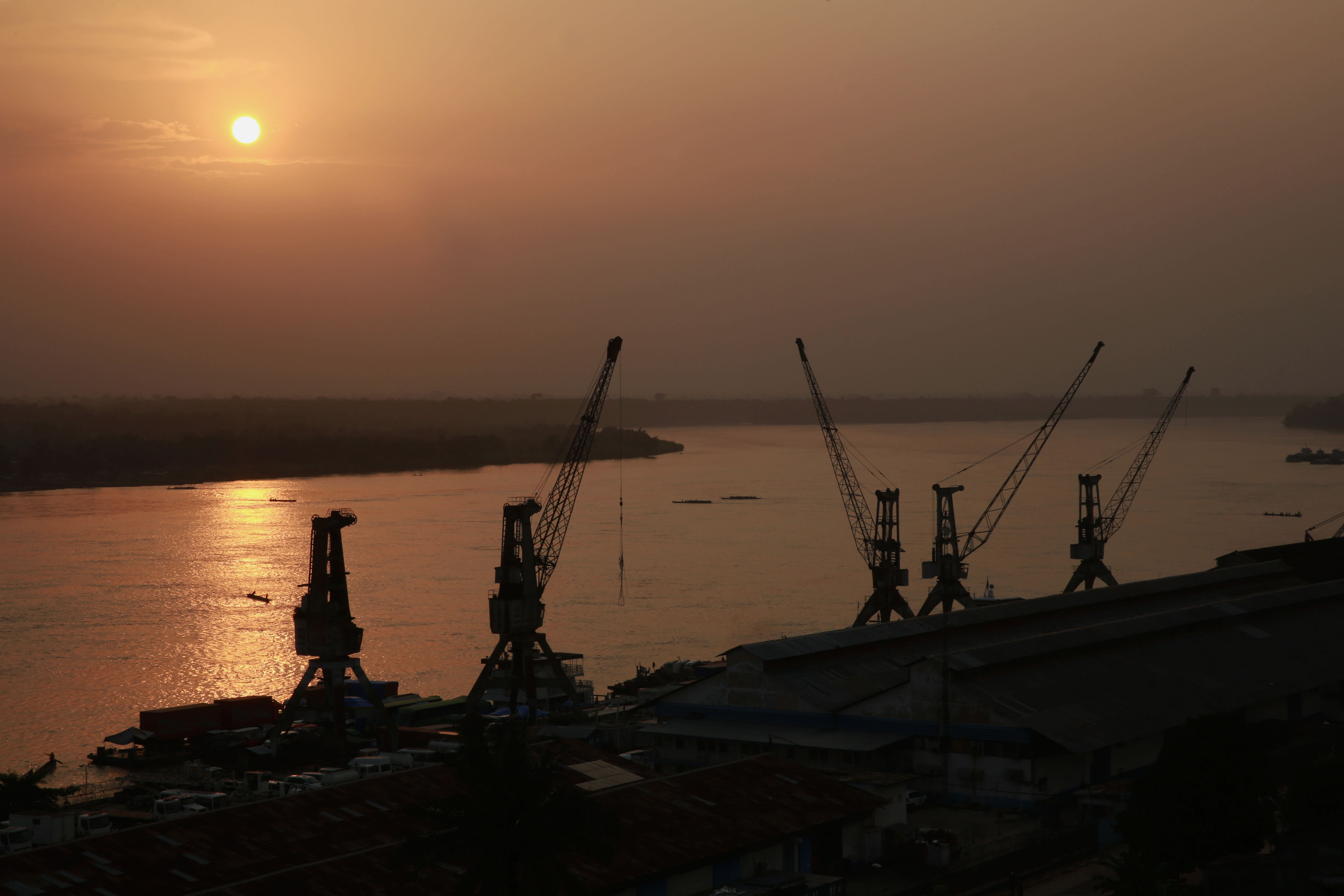
The Democratic Republic Of The Congo, a country rich in natural resources, often used as an example of unequal exchange due to its Belgian governance in the 19th century, and its stunted economic development despite being the world's largest exporter of cobalt

Unequal exchange is used primarily in Marxist economics, but also in ecological economics (more specifically also as ecologically unequal exchange), to describe the systemic hidden transfer of labor and ecological value from poor countries in the imperial periphery (mainly in the Global South) to rich countries and monopolistic corporations in the imperial core (mainly in the Global North) due to structural inequalities in the global economy.

Due to biased terms of trade and the undervaluation of labor and goods from the global South compared to the North, poor countries are forced to export a much larger quantity of labor and resources than they import to maintain a monetary balance of trade. This enables the global North to achieve a net appropriation through trade, fostering development in the former while impoverishing the global South.

The theory of unequal exchange is a rejection of the fundamental assumptions of Ricardian and neoclassical theories of comparative advantage, which claim that free trade based on comparative costs is beneficial to all parties and in turn represents the theoretical justification of neoliberal trade policies. More generally, the concept is a criticism of the idea that the operation of markets would have egalitarian effects, rather than accentuating the market position of the strong and disadvantaging the weak.

== Historical background ==
The concept of unequal exchange was first developed by dependency and world-systems theorists, who questioned the dominant assumption according to which nations’ economic performance is linked to internal conditions, like good governance, strong institutions and free markets and that lower-income countries failed to develop because of their lack of the latter.

Analyzing economic relations within the global economy, these critical perspectives contend that historically, the wealth of rich countries has depended on the appropriation of resources of countries from the Global South. According to Hickel et al., this trend has persisted beyond the historical colonial period and continues to manifest in the modern global economy. Quantifying the value of resources appropriated from the Global South through unequal exchange since 1960, they assert that the Global North's economic growth and high levels of consumption are facilitated by its extraction of value from other parts of the world through trade, especially since the 1980s.

== Theoretical framework ==
During the 1960s and 1970s, Marxist authors explored the notion of superprofit applied to global capitalism and the inequalities between core and peripheral economies.

Marxist authors like Arghiri Emmanuel, Charles Bettelheim, Christian Palloix, and Samir Amin showed how the distortions between the value and the prices of commodities circulating in the global economies had started a process of theft of socially necessary labor time (value transfer) from periphery to core countries, which was denominated global unequal exchange. The Argentinian economist Raúl Prebisch was among the first to refer to a process of unequal exchange between the peripheral and core countries, showing how the prices of raw materials exported by developing nations were lower than the goods manufactured in developed economies.

Bettelheim and Palloix further argued that, because of the monopolistic control that rich countries have on the global economy, they are able to sell commodities in the global market at prices above their market value, while for peripheral economies the prices are often lower than the production prices. This creates a transfer of value from the developing economies in the periphery to the core economies, putting a structural mechanism of unequal exchange in place.

Amin and Emmanuel’s understanding of unequal exchange somewhat differs from the other thinkers, as they focus on the differences between national wages as a key factor producing the conditions for unequal exchange. Amin underlined that unequal value transfers in global trade were not determined primarily by asymmetries in productivity, but by the profound wage differences between core and periphery. Emmanuel defines unequal exchange as a consequence of the structure of international trade. As prices of production are given by the sum of cost of constant capital (value of materials and goods necessary to produce a commodity) and variable capital (wages paid for the production of a commodity), lower wages imply lower prices of production for the periphery, while the socially necessary labor is independent of wage rate. Low wages in the periphery and high wages in the center, therefore, result in a set of international prices whereby the periphery sells its product at less than its social value while the center benefits from higher prices than the value of its products. According to Emmanuel, unequal exchange is determined by the differences in rates of surplus values resulting from wage differentials: this mechanism determines the exploitation of the periphery by the center.

== Classification/quantification of unequal exchange ==
Unequal exchange theory was notably advanced by Raúl Prebisch in the mid-20th century, who argued that global trade benefits industrialized nations at the expense of developing ones. Through his work with the United Nations Economic Commission for Latin America (ECLAC), Prebisch identified a pattern in which the prices of raw materials exported by Latin America, such as coffee and copper, declined relative to the manufactured goods imported from wealthy nations, a phenomenon known as the "declining terms of trade." This led to the development of the Prebisch-Singer Hypothesis, which posited that peripheral nations, those exporting raw goods, were structurally disadvantaged in the global economy. Prebisch’s ideas laid the foundation for dependency theory and inspired policies like import substitution industrialization (ISI) to reduce reliance on imports and promote local industrial growth in developing countries.

Samir Amin used a system based on wage differences to calculate the unequal exchange with the assumptions of constant productivity and using Global Northern prices. Gernot Köhler in turn used a method that also included price differentials into calculation, using differences between Purchasing Power Parity and Market Exchange rate to calculate the drain. More recently, a Marxian input–output approach combining Marx’s value theory with Leontief analysis and World Input–Output Database data has been used to quantify unequal exchange and its effects on growth across 43 countries between 2000 and 2014, showing that unequal exchange could have reduced North–South convergence by an estimated 34% during this period.

Dorninger et al. relied on the environmentally-extended multi-regional input-output modeling (EEMRIO) to quantify the unequal exchange from a perspective based on the theory of ecologically unequal exchange. Jason Hickel et al., using a similar method, calculated the amount that was drained from the Global South between the years 1990 to 2015 was equivalent to 242 trillion in 2010 US Dollars. In line with Samir Amin's original suggestion, Hickel et al. used Northern prices to quantify the physical resources that were drained from the Global South in financial terms.

== Structural factors ==
Various historical and political factors create the structural conditions that sustain unequal exchange.

It started with dispossession and destruction of local mode of living in colonized countries (e.g. destruction of subsistence economies), that created surplus of unemployed labor. Suwandi et al. also describe the “depeasantization of a large portion of the global periphery through the spread of agribusiness” as “central to the creation of a reserve army of unemployed." They refer to the concept of global labor arbitrage, to indicate the replacement of high-wage workers in the US and other rich economies with workers in the Global South that perform the same tasks at lower wages.

Unequal exchange shows the continuation of a pattern of appropriation that characterized the colonial period, which has expanded in the post-colonial era and characterizes the structure of today’s world economy. Among the factors that enable the continuation of these patterns of appropriation, Hickel et al. identify price inequalities and power. In terms of prices, they underline that the dramatic differences in prices of manufactured goods exported by Southern and Northern countries does not match a significant qualitative difference between the labor performed respectively in the North and in the South. Contrarily to what is commonly perceived, global commodity chains in the South involve labor ranging from manual work to managerial and engineering, logistics and IT tasks, similarly to labor performed at the end of the chain in the Global North. They underline the paradox by which, due to wage disparities, highly skilled labor performed in the South might even be paid less than “unskilled” labor performed in the North.

A common critique is that wage inequalities between the South and the North can be explained by the higher productivity of northern workers in comparison to southern workers. However, productivity in conventional economics is determined by prices, not by actual productivity. Northern states and firms leverage their power within the global commodity chains to depress prices of final products, thus their productivity seems to improve as compared to their counterparts in the South, even though the production process is unchanged. Therefore, differences in wages between the Global South and the Global North can be explained by the exploitation of Southern workers, who are paid less for the same work as compared to their northern counterparts.

Looking into how price inequalities are maintained, making possible the process of exploitation just outlined, Hickel et al. point to the unequal distribution of power among countries. One central element to consider is that through patents, northern firms set prices artificially high. As 97% of all patents are held by corporations in high-income countries, this skews the equilibrium disproportionally in favor of the latter.

Another crucial factor is the geo-political imbalances in the world economy, maintained through the institutions of international economic governance: Northern countries hold the majority (despite representing the minority of the world population) within the main institutions, like the International Monetary Fund (IMF), the World Bank (WB) and the World Trade Organization (WTO, where bargaining power is determined by market size and the United States holds effective veto power).

Moreover, structural adjustments programs (SAPs) brought about massive cuts in public expenditure in the Global South, decreasing salaries, weakening labor rights and curtailing unions. Free trade agreements (FTAs) and SAPs forced global South governments to remove tariffs and subsidies and protect new industries, preventing import substitution that would have contributed to driving prices down.

Other important factors that perpetuate price inequalities are the problem of tax evasion and illicit financial flows that drive massive amounts of economic resources from Southern to Northern countries, and the structural dependence on foreign investors and access to Northern markets that forces Southern firms and countries to compete with each other, in a race to the bottom.

As clearly put by Hickel et al: “Structural power imbalances in the world economy ensure that labor and resources in the South remain cheap and accessible to international capital, while Northern exports enjoy comparatively higher prices. These price differentials enable a significant drain of labor and resources from the South.”

== In Marxist economics ==
Karl Marx aimed to go beyond moral discussion, in order to establish what, objectively speaking, real values are, how they are established, and what the objective regulating principles of trade are, basing himself principally on the insights of Adam Smith and David Ricardo (but many other classical political economists as well). He was no longer immediately concerned with what a "morally justified price" is, but rather with what "objective economic value" is, such as is established in real market activity and real trading practices.

Marx's answer is that "real value" is essentially the normal labour cost involved in producing it, its real production cost, measured in units of labour time or in cost-prices. Marx argues that the "real values" in a capitalist economy take the form of prices of production, defined as the sum of the average cost price (goods used up + labour costs + operating expenses) and the average profit reaped by the producing enterprises.

Formally, the exchange between Capital and Labour is equal in the marketplace, because, assuming everybody has free access to the market, and an adequate legal-security framework exists protecting people against robbery, then all contractual relations are established through free and voluntary consent, on the basis of juridical equality of all citizens before the law. If that equality breaks down, it can only be, because of immoral behaviour by citizens.

But Marx argues that, substantively, the transaction between Capital and Labour is unequal, because:

- Some economic agents enter the market with large assets they own, as private property, while other enter the market owning very little at all, except their capacity to do work of various kinds. That is to say, the bargaining power and bargaining positions of economic agents are differentially distributed, and this means, that private accumulation of capital occurs on the basis of appropriating surplus labour, either the surplus labour of the workers whom the owner of capital assets hires, or the surplus labour of workers hired by another owner of capital assets.
- External to the market, goods are produced by workers with a value in excess of labor-compensation, appropriated by the owners of productive capital assets. Marx's reference to unequal exchange refers therefore both to unequal exchange in production, and unequal exchange in trade.
- Another type of unequal exchange is a corollary of the tendency of the rate of profit to equalize under competitive conditions, insofar as producers obtain the ruling market prices for their output, irrespective of the different unit labor-costs of different producers of the same product.

In Capital, however, Marx does not discuss unequal exchange in trade in detail, only unequal exchange in the sphere of production. His argument is that unequal exchange implied by labour contracts, is the basis for unequal exchange in trade, and without that basis, unequal exchange in trade could not exist, or would collapse. His aim was to show that exploitation could occur even on the basis of formally equal exchange.

Marx however also notes that unequal exchange occurs through production differentials as between different nations. Capitalists utilized this differential in several ways:

- By buying a product produced more cheaply in another nation, and selling it at home or elsewhere for a much higher price;
- By relocating the site of production to another nation where production costs are lower, because of lower input costs (wage costs and materials/equipment supply costs). That way, they pocketed an extra profit.
- By campaigning for protective tariffs shielding local industry from foreign competition.

That, Marxian economists argue, is essentially why the international dynamic of capital accumulation and market expansion takes the form of imperialism, i.e., an aggressive international competition process aimed at lowering costs, and increasing sales and profits.

As Marx put it,

"From the possibility that profit may be less than surplus value, hence that capital [may] exchange profitably without realizing itself in the strict sense, it follows that not only individual capitalists, but also nations may continually exchange with one another, may even continually repeat the exchange on an ever-expanding scale, without for that reason necessarily gaining in equal degrees. One of the nations may continually appropriate for itself a part of the surplus labour of the other, giving back nothing for it in the exchange, except that the measure here [is] not as in the exchange between capitalist and worker."

To counteract unequal exchange between socialist countries that were members of the Council for Mutual Economic Assistance (COMECON), members countries like Cuba which were deemed underdeveloped received subsidies.

== Empirical indicators ==
- The terms of trade. This refers to the relative prices of goods and services traded on international markets, specifically the weighted average of a nation's exports relative to its import prices, as indicated by the ratio of the export price index to the import price index, measured relative to a base year.
- Accounting analysis of product unit values, i.e., the composition of the various costs included in the final market price of a commodity (the price to the final consumer who uses or consumes the product). If for example it is found that an increasing fraction of that sale price represents costs other than direct production and transport costs, but instead profit, interest and rent income, then unequal exchange in trade has probably increased. But because of the "creative" gross and net income & expenditure accounting that is done, this is often not easy, since various incomes and expenditures are included under headings which make it difficult to understand what the costs were actually for, or what activity gave rise to the incomes.
- The change in the shares of net income between social classes and groups. If the discrepancy between the gross and net incomes of one social class, relative to another social class, increases, then a transfer of claims to wealth is occurring. This could be due to less income generated in production, or to income transferred in exchange (trading), or to taxation. We can compare also the actual average labour hours put in by one social class, to the net income accruing to that social class.
- The trend in the cost structure of production of a country as a whole, or particular sectors, which refers to the amount of capital expenditures not directly related to the actual production of a product, i.e. financial costs incurred in addition to materials, equipment and labour (interest payments, incidental expenses, insurance, taxes, rents and the like).
- The proportion of net profits, net rents, net interest payments and net property income transferred to other nations or obtained from other nations, such as is shown for example by the discrepancy between GDP and GNI and by Balance of Payments data, and the difference between imports and exports of goods and services.

== See also ==
- Arbitrage
- Balanced trade
- Capital accumulation
- Fair trade
- Singer–Prebisch thesis
- Trade
- United Nations Conference on Trade and Development
- Value-form
- Ecologically unequal exchange
