= Andre Gunder Frank =

German-American sociologist (1929–2005)

André Gunder Frank
- Born: February 24, 1929; Berlin, Germany
- Died: April 23, 2005 (aged 76); Luxembourg, Luxembourg
- Known for: Contributions to world-systems theory
- Spouse(s): Marta Fuentes, Nancy Howell, Alison Candela
- Parent: Leonhard Frank
- Awards: Bentley Book Prize

Academic background
- Education: Swarthmore College (BA); University of Michigan (MA); University of Chicago (PhD)
- Thesis: Growth and Productivity in Ukrainian Agriculture from 1928 to 1955 (1957)
- Doctoral advisor: Bert F. Hoselitz
- Website: rrojasdatabank.info/agfrank/

André Gunder Frank, born Andreas Frank; (February 24, 1929 – April 23, 2005) was a German-American sociologist and economic historian who promoted dependency theory after 1970 and world-systems theory after 1984. He employed some Marxian concepts on political economy, but rejected Marx's stages of history, and economic history generally.

== Biography ==
Born Andreas Frank in Weimar Germany, his parents were the socialist and pacifist writer Leonhard Frank and his second wife Elena Maqenne Penswehr. His family, which was of Jewish origins, fled from Germany when the Nazis came to power. Frank was educated in various schools in Switzerland before the family emigrated to the United States in 1941. The young Frank participated without much success in track and field competitions, earning the ironic nickname "Gunder" (after the Swedish running champion Gunder Hägg) from his high-school teammates. Frank later simplified his first name to "Andre" and adopted "Gunder" as a middle name.

In the United States, Frank attended Swarthmore College (which had been founded as a Quaker institution), gaining an economics degree in 1950. He then moved to the University of Chicago as a graduate student in the economics department, but he was forced out after only one year. Frank received a master's degree in economics from the University of Michigan and later spent some time among the beatniks in San Francisco, before returning to Chicago in 1955 as a research assistant in Bert Hoselitz's Center for Economic Development and Cultural Change (CEDCC). In 1958 he received a Ph.D. degree in economics from the University of Chicago, with a dissertation entitled Growth and Productivity in Ukrainian Agriculture from 1928 to 1955. Although various sources later claimed that Frank's doctoral supervisor had been Milton Friedman (whose laissez faire approach to economics Frank would later harshly criticize), Frank in fact received his degree under the direction of Hoselitz.

Frank was an assistant professor of economics at Michigan State University (MSU), but in the early 1960s he became disillusioned with academic life in the US and took a leave of absence from MSU. In 1962 he moved to Latin America, inaugurating a remarkable period of travel that confirmed his peripatetic tendencies. His most notable work during this time was his stint as Professor of Sociology and Economics at the University of Chile, where he was involved in reforms under the socialist government of Salvador Allende. After Allende's government was toppled by a coup d'état in 1973, Frank fled to Europe, where he occupied a series of university positions. From 1981 until his retirement in 1994 he was professor in developmental economy at the University of Amsterdam.

He was married to Marta Fuentes, with whom he wrote several studies about social movements, and with Marta he had two sons. Marta died in Amsterdam in June 1993. His second wife was sociologist Nancy Howell, a friend for forty years: while married to her, they lived in Toronto. Frank died in 2005 of complications related to his cancer while under the care of his third wife, Alison Candela.

== Works and ideas ==
During his career, Frank taught and did research in departments of anthropology, economics, geography, history, international relations, political science, and sociology. He worked at nine universities in North America, three in Latin America, and five in Europe. He gave countless lectures and seminars at dozens of universities and other institutions all around the world in English, French, Spanish, Portuguese, Italian, German and Dutch. Frank wrote widely on the economic, social and political history and contemporary development of the world system, the industrially developed countries, and especially of the Third World and Latin America. He produced over 1,000 publications in 30 languages.

His work in the 1990s focused on world history. He returned to his analysis of global political economy in the new millennium inspired by a lecture he gave at the Stockholm School of Economics in Riga (SSE Riga). In 2006 SSE Riga received Andre Gunder Frank's personal library collection and set-up the Andre Gunder Frank Memorial Library in his honor, with the support of the Friedrich Ebert Foundation.

Frank was a prolific author, writing 40 books. He published widely on political economy, economic history, international relations, historical sociology, and world history. Perhaps his most notable work is Capitalism and Underdevelopment in Latin America. Published in 1967, it was one of the formative texts in dependency theory. In his later career he produced works such as ReOrient: Global Economy in the Asian Age and, with Barry Gills, The World System: Five Hundred Years or Five Thousand. Frank's theories center on the idea that a nation's economic strength, largely determined by historical circumstances—especially geography—dictates its global power. He is also well known for suggesting that purely export oriented solutions to development create imbalances detrimental to poor countries. Frank has made significant contributions to the world-systems theory (which, according to him, should simply be called the World System), insisting that the idea of numerous "world-systems" did not make much sense (indeed, if there are many "world-systems" in the world, then they simply do not deserve to be called "world-systems"), and we should rather speak about one single World System. He has argued that a World System was formed no later than in the 4th millennium BC; his argument contrasts sharply with the scholarly majority who posit beginnings in the "long 16th century" (a position held, for example, by Immanuel Wallerstein).

== Selected publications ==
=== Books ===
- (1966) The Development of Underdevelopment. Monthly Review Press.
- (1967) Capitalism and Underdevelopment in Latin America. Monthly Review Press.
- (1969) Latin America: Underdevelopment or Revolution. Monthly Review Press.
- (1971) Lumpenburguesía : Lumpendesarrollo. México : Era. OCLC 1024642474 (Spanish)
- (1972) Lumpenbourgeoisie, Lumpendevelopment. Monthly Review Press. (tr. Marion Davis Berdecio) OCLC 485427642
- (1975) On Capitalist Underdevelopment. Bombay: Oxford University Press.
- (1976) Economic Genocide in Chile. Equilibrium on the point of a bayonet. Nottingham, UK: Spokesman.
- (1978) World Accumulation, 1492–1789. Monthly Review Press.
- (1978) Dependent Accumulation and Underdevelopment. Monthly Review Press.
- (1979) Mexican Agriculture 1521-1630: Transformation of the Mode of Production. Cambridge University Press.
- (1980) Crisis: In the World Economy. New York: Holmes & Meier.
- (1981) Crisis: In the Third World. New York: Holmes & Meier.
- (1981) Reflections on the World Economic Crisis. Monthly Review Press.
- (1982) Dynamics of Global Crisis, with S. Amin, G. Arrighi and I. Wallerstein. Monthly Review Press.
- (1983) The European Challenge. Nottingham, UK: Spokesman.
- (1984) Critique and Anti-Critique. New York: Praeger.
- (1996) The World System: Five Hundred Years or Five Thousand? with Barry K. Gills, Routledge.
- (1998) ReOrient: Global Economy in the Asian Age. Berkeley: University of California Press.
- (2013) ReOrienting the 19th Century: Global Economy in the Continuing Asian Age, with Robert A. Denemark, Paradigm Publishers.

=== Journal articles ===
- (1958) "General Productivity in Soviet Agriculture and Industry," Journal of Political Economy
- (1958) "Goal Ambiguity and Conflicting Standards: An approach to the study of organization," Human Organization
- (1977) "On so-called primitive accumulation," Dialectical Anthropology 2, 87
- (1977) "Long Live Transideological Enterprise: the socialist economies in the capitalist international division of labor," Review: A Journal of the Fernand Braudel Center
- (1989) "Ten Theses on Social Movements," with M. Fuentes, World Development
- (1990) "Theoretical Introduction to Five Thousand Years of World System History," Review: A Journal of the Fernand Braudel Center
- (1992) "Third World War: A Political Economy of the Gulf War and New World Order," Third World Quarterly 13(2).
- (1994) "Is Real World Socialism Possible?," Democracy & Nature, Vol.2, No.3, pp. 152–175

=== Book chapters ===
- (1990) "Civil Democracy, Social Movements in World History," with M. Fuentes. In Amin et al., Transforming the Revolution.
- (1990) "Revolution in Eastern Europe: Lessons for democratic socialist movements (and socialists)." In Tabb, ed., Future of Socialism.
- (1992) "The Underdevelopment of Development," with M.F. Frank. In Savoie, D.J. and I. Brecher, eds., Equity and Efficiency in Economic Development. Montreal: McGill-Queen's University Press.
- (2001) "The Global Economy, AD 1400-1800: Comparisons and Relations." In Suneja, V., ed., Understanding Business: Markets. A Multidimensional Approach to the Market Economy. London: Routledge.

== See also ==
- History of globalization
- James Morris Blaut
- Samir Amin
- John M. Hobson
- World-systems theory
