= List of regions by past GDP (PPP) =

These are lists of regions and countries by their estimated real gross domestic product (GDP) in terms of purchasing power parity (PPP), the value of all final goods and services produced within a country/region in a given year. GDP dollar (international dollar) estimates here are derived from PPP estimates. These datasets are widely used in economic history and have also been used in various secondary analyses based on Maddison's estimates.

== Methodology ==
In the absence of sufficient data for nearly all economies until well into the 19th century, past GDP cannot be calculated, but at best only roughly estimated. In a first step, economic historians try to reconstruct the GDP per capita for a given political or geographical entity from the meagre evidence. This value is then multiplied by estimated population size, another determinant for which as a rule only little ancient data is available.

A key notion in the whole process is that of subsistence, the income level which is necessary for sustaining one's life. Since pre-modern societies, by modern standards, were characterized by a very low degree of urbanization and a large majority of people working in the agricultural sector, economic historians prefer to express income in cereal units. To achieve comparability over space and time, these numbers are then converted into monetary units such as International Dollars, a third step which leaves a relatively wide margin of interpretation.

The formula thus is: GDP (PPP) = GDP per capita (PPP) x population size

It should be stressed that, historically speaking, population size is the far more important multiplier in the equation. This is because, in contrast to industrial economies, the average income ceiling of premodern agrarian societies was quite low everywhere, possibly not higher than twice the subsistence level. Therefore, the total GDP as given below primarily reflects the respective historical population size, and is much less indicative of contemporary living standards than, for example, estimations of past GDP per capita are.

According to the 20th-century macroeconomist Paul Bairoch, a pioneer in historical economic analysis,

it is obvious that by itself the volume of total GNP has no important significance, and that the volume of GNP is not by itself the expression of the economic strength of a nation.

Rather, Bairoch advocates a formula combining GNP per capita and total GNP to give a better measure of the economic performance of national economies.

== World ==
=== 1750–1990 (Bairoch) ===
In his 1995 book Economics and World History, economic historian Paul Bairoch gave the following estimates in terms of 1960 US dollars, for GNP from 1750 to 1990, comparing what are today the Third World (Asia, Africa, Latin America) and the First World (Western Europe, Northern America, Japan)

GNP (PPP) in billions of US dollars
Year	1960 dollars		1990 dollars	
Year	Third World^{[A]}	First World^{[B]}	Third World^{[A]}	First World^{[B]}
1750	112	35	495	155
1800	137	47	605	208
1830	150	67	662	296
1860	159	118	702	521
1900	184	297	813	1,312
1913	217	430	958	1,899
1928	252	568	1,113	2,508
1938	293	678	1,294	2,994
1950	338	889	1,493	3,926
1970	810	2,450	3,577	10,820
1980	1,280	3,400	5,653	15,015
1990	1,730	4,350	7,640	19,210

A Third World refers to Asia (excluding Japan), Africa, and Latin America.

B First World refers to Europe, Russia, the United States, Canada, and Japan.

=== 1–2008 (Maddison) ===
The following estimates are taken exclusively from the 2007 monograph Contours of the World Economy, 1–2030 AD by the British economist Angus Maddison. When graphed, one can see that South Asia was the world's largest economy from year 1 to year 1500, when it lost the position to China. South Asia again regained the pole position in the year 1700 before losing it to China in year 1820. China subsequently lost to the industrialising Western Europe, in the middle of the 19th century. Cumulatively from the data, South Asia maintained the world's largest economy for a large majority of the past two millennia over 1500 years (1-1500, 1700), and China has maintained it for roughly 300 years in the past two millennia (1500-1700, 1820-1890).

GDP (PPP) in millions of 1990 International Dollars
Country / Region	1	1000	1500	1600	1700	1820	1870	1913	1950	1973	1989	2008
Austria	213	298	1,414	2,093	2,483	4,104	8,419	23,451	25,702	85,227	124,791	198,004
Belgium	135	170	1,225	1,561	2,288	4,529	13,716	32,347	47,190	118,516	166,396	246,103
Denmark	72	144	443	569	727	1,471	3,782	11,670	29,654	70,032	93,728	135,037
Finland	8	16	136	215	255	913	1,999	6,389	17,051	51,724	84,092	127,676
France	2,366	2,763	10,912	15,559	19,539	35,468	72,100	144,489	220,492	683,965	1,000,286	1,423,562
Germany	1,225	1,435	8,256	12,656	13,650	26,819	72,149	237,332	265,354	944,755	1,302,212	1,713,405
Italy	6,475	2,250	11,550	14,410	14,630	22,535	41,814	95,487	164,957	582,713	906,053	1,157,636
Netherlands	85	128	723	2,072	4,047	4,288	9,952	24,955	60,642	175,791	247,906	411,055
Norway	40	80	183	266	361	777	2,360	5,988	17,728	44,852	76,733	132,365
Sweden	80	160	382	626	1,231	3,098	6,927	17,403	47,269	109,794	149,415	193,352
Switzerland	128	123	411	750	1,068	2,165	5,581	16,483	42,545	117,251	141,599	190,328
UK	320	800	2,815	6,007	10,709	36,232	100,180	224,618	347,850	675,941	940,908	1,446,959
12 country total	11,146	8,366	38,450	56,784	70,988	142,399	338,979	840,612	1,286,434	3,660,561	5,235,115	7,402,911
Portugal	180	255	606	814	1,638	3,043	4,219	7,467	17,615	63,397	102,922	154,132
Spain	1,867	1,800	4,495	7,029	7,481	12,299	19,556	41,653	61,429	266,896	454,166	797,927
Other	1,240	504	632	975	1,106	2,110	4,712	12,478	30,600	105,910	169,648	343,059
Total Western Europe	14,433	10,925	44,183	65,602	81,213	159,851	367,466	902,210	1,396,078	4,096,764	5,961,851	8,698,029
Eastern Europe	1,956	2,600	6,696	9,289	11,393	24,906	50,163	134,793	185,023	550,756	718,039	1,030,628
Former USSR	1,560	2,840	8,458	11,426	16,196	37,678	83,646	232,351	510,243	1,513,070	2,037,253	2,242,206
United States	272	520	800	600	527	12,548	98,374	517,383	1,455,916	3,536,622	5,703,521	9,485,136
Other Western offshoots	176	228	320	320	306	951	13,119	65,558	179,574	521,667	856,847	1,448,542
Total Western offshoots	448	748	1,120	920	833	13,499	111,493	582,941	1,635,490	4,058,289	6,560,368	10,933,678
Mexico	880	1,800	3,188	1,134	2,558	5,000	6,214	25,921	67,368	279,302	491,767	877,312
Other Latin America	1,360	2,760	4,100	2,629	3,788	9,921	21,097	94,875	347,960	1,110,158	1,735,919	3,168,621
Total Latin America	2,240	4,560	7,288	3,763	6,346	14,921	27,311	120,796	415,328	1,389,460	2,227,686	4,045,933
Japan	1,200	3,188	7,700	9,620	15,390	20,739	25,393	71,653	160,966	1,242,932	2,208,858	2,904,141
China	26,820	26,550	61,800	96,000	82,800	228,600	189,740	241,431	244,985	739,414	2,051,813	8,908,894
India (Subcontinent)^{[A]}	33,750	33,750	60,500	74,250	90,750	111,417	134,882	204,242	222,222	494,832	1,043,912	3,415,183
Other east Asia	4,845	8,968	20,822	24,582	28,440	36,451	53,155	122,874	256,938	829,023	2,021,528	5,154,979
West Asia	10,120	12,415	10,495	12,637	12,291	15,270	22,468	40,588	106,283	548,120	855,130	1,905,346
Total Asia (excl. Japan)	75,535	81,683	153,617	207,469	214,281	391,738	400,245	609,135	830,428	2,621,624	5,972,383	19,384,402
Africa	8,030	13,835	19,383	23,473	25,776	31,266	45,234	79,486	203,131	549,993	889,922	1,734,918
World	105,402	120,379	248,445	331,562	371,428	694,598	1,110,951	2,733,365	5,331,689	16,022,888	26,576,359	50,973,935
Country / Region	1	1000	1500	1600	1700	1820	1870	1913	1950	1973	1989	2008

A From 1 AD to 1913 AD, Indian Subcontinent includes modern Bangladesh, Bhutan, India, Nepal, Pakistan, and Sri Lanka. From 1950 onwards, India refers only to the modern Republic of India.

Maddison' assumptions have been both admired and criticized by academics and journalists. By Bryan Haig, who has characterized Maddison's figures for 19th century Australia as "inaccurate and irrelevant", by W. W. Rostow, according to whom "this excessive macroeconomic bias also causes him (Maddison) to mis-date, in my view, the beginning of what he calls the capitalist era at 1820 rather than, say, the mid-1780s."

W. J. MacPherson has described Maddison's work on early medieval India of using "dubious comparative data." Maddison's estimates have also been critically reviewed and revised by the Italian economists Giovanni Federico and Elio Lo Cascio/Paolo Malanima (see below).

However, economist and journalist Evan Davis has praised Maddison's research by citing it as a "fantastic publication" and that it was "based on the detailed scholarship of the world expert on historical economic data Angus Maddison." He also added that "One shouldn't read the book in the belief the statistics are accurate to 12 decimal places."

== Europe ==
=== 1830–1938 (Bairoch) ===
The following estimates were made by the economic historian Paul Bairoch. Contrary to most other estimates on this page, the GNP (at market prices) is given here in 1960 US dollars. Unlike Maddison, Bairoch allows for the fluctuation of borders, basing his estimates mostly on the historical boundaries at the given points in time.

GNP (at market prices) in millions of 1960 US dollars
Country / Region	1830	1840	1850	1860	1870	1880	1890	1900	1910	1913	1925	1938
Austria	–	–	–	–	–	–	–	–	–	–	4,314	4,320
Austria-Hungary	7,210	8,315	9,190	9,996	11,380	12,297	15,380	19,400	23,970	26,050	–	–
Baltic countries	–	–	–	–	–	–	–	–	–	–	2,298	2,760
Belgium	1,098	1,397	1,809	2,302	2,882	3,256	3,804	4,800	6,308	6,794	7,658	8,501
Bulgaria	–	–	–	588	616	611	808	970	1,165	1,260	1,613	2,628
Czechoslovakia	–	–	–	–	–	–	–	–	–	–	6,822	8,050
Denmark	256	292	361	476	612	788	1,095	1,544	2,031	2,421	2,893	2,893
Finland	256	295	370	420	550	670	860	1,110	1,395	1,670	1,910	3,339
France	8,582	10,335	11,870	13,326	16,800	17,381	19,758	23,500	26,869	27,401	36,262	39,284
Germany	7,235	8,320	10,395	12,771	16,697	19,993	26,454	35,800	45,523	49,760	45,002	77,178
Greece	–	200	220	250	365	440	640	780	910	1,540	2,340	4,200
Hungary	–	–	–	–	–	–	–	–	–	–	3,025	4,137
Ireland	–	–	–	–	–	–	–	–	–	–	1,862	1,907
Italy	7,570	8,951	8,666	10,466	11,273	11,745	12,435	14,820	15,598	17,624	19,510	24,701
Netherlands	913	1,105	1,318	1,502	1,823	2,188	2,660	3,164	4,150	4,660	6,696	7,987
Norway	316	378	490	642	728	886	1,041	1,286	1,601	1,834	2,370	3,812
Poland	–	–	–	–	–	–	–	–	–	–	7,325	12,885
Portugal	860	945	985	1,100	1,175	1,270	1,360	1,550	1,710	1,800	2,046	2,634
Romania	–	–	760	836	950	1,100	1,350	1,700	2,125	2,450	5,123	6,780
Russia/USSR	10,550	11,200	12,700	14,400	22,920	23,250	21,180	32,000	43,830	52,420	32,600	75,964
Serbia	–	–	–	320	345	382	432	560	700	725	–	–
Spain	3,600	4,150	4,700	5,400	5,300	5,400	5,675	6,500	7,333	7,450	9,498	8,511
Sweden	557	617	729	860	1,025	1,385	1,700	2,358	3,261	3,824	4,627	6,908
Switzerland	580	700	930	1,200	1,460	1,920	2,100	2,599	3,355	3,700	4,300	5,063
United Kingdom	8,245	10,431	12,591	16,072	19,628	23,551	29,441	36,273	40,623	44,074	43,700	56,103
Yugoslavia	–	–	–	–	–	–	–	–	–	–	3,870	5,221
Europe	58,152	66,997	77,937	91,073	114,966	126,975	146,723	188,534	231,550	256,845	257,434	376,947
Western Europe	38,910	–	–	63,670	–	–	–	126,900	-	163,780	179,830	231,560
Eastern Europe	19,240	–	–	27,400	–	–	–	61,640	–	93,060	77,600	145,390
Country / Region	1830	1840	1850	1860	1870	1880	1890	1900	1910	1913	1925	1938

=== 1500–1870 (Lo Cascio/Malanima) ===
The following estimates are taken from a revision of Angus Maddison's numbers for the whole of Europe by the Italian economists Elio Lo Cascio and Paolo Malanima. According to their calculations, the basic level of European GDP (PPP) was historically higher, but its increase was less pronounced.

Year	GDP (PPP) in millions of 1990 International Dollars
1500	111,680
1600	133,760
1700	159,440
1750	205,530
1800	253,900
1870	619,970

== Empires ==
=== Indian empires (AD 1–1947) ===
At year 1, year 1000, year 1500 and till the start of British colonisation in India in 17th century, India's GDP always varied between ~22 - 33% world's total GDP and was the largest economy in the world from year 1 until year 1500, which dropped to 2% by Independence of India in 1947. At the same time, the Britain's share of the world economy rose from 2.9% in 1700 up to 9% in 1870 alone.

=== Chinese empires ===
Angus Maddison's below GDP estimates for China refer to the following empires:

GDP in 2023 international dollars
Year	Chinese region	per capita	Avg GDP growth rate	GDP (% World)	Population	Population (% World)	Period
1600	96,000,000,000	600	0.44%	28.95	160,000,000	28.77	Ming dynasty
1700	82,800,000,000	600	-0.15%	22.29	138,000,000	22.87	Qing dynasty
1820	228,600,000,000	600	0.85%	32.91	381,000,000	36.57	Qing dynasty
1870	189,740,000,000	530	-0.37%	17.08	358,000,000	28.06	Qing dynasty
1913	241,431,000,000	552	0.56%	8.83	437,140,000	24.38	Republic of China

=== British Empire and India ===
Goedele De Keersmaeker estimated the GDP of the British Empire using Angus Maddison's data. Keersmaeker estimated that the British Empire's share of world GDP was 24.28% in 1870 and 19.7% in 1913. The empire's largest economy in 1870 was British India with a 12.15% share of world GDP, followed by the United Kingdom with a 9.03% share. The empire's largest economy in 1913 was the United Kingdom with an 8.22% share of world GDP, followed by British India with a 7.47% share.

=== Roman Empire ===
Much work in estimating past GDP has been done in the study of the Roman economy, following the pioneering studies by Keith Hopkins (1980) and Raymond Goldsmith (1984). The estimates by Peter Temin, Angus Maddison, Branko Milanović and Peter Fibiger Bang follow the basic method established by Goldsmith, varying mainly only in their set of initial numbers; these are then stepped up to estimations of the expenditure checked by those on the income side. Walter Scheidel/Steven Friesen determine GDP on the relationship between certain significant economic indicators which were historically found to be plausible; two independent control assumptions provide the upper and lower limit of the probable size of the Roman GDP.

The GDP per capita of the Byzantine Empire, the continuation of the Roman Empire in the east, has been estimated by the World Bank economist Branko Milanović to range between $680 and 770 (in 1990 International Dollars) at its peak around 1000 AD, that is the reign of Basil II. The Byzantine population size at the time is estimated to have been 12 to 18 million. This would yield a total GDP somewhere between 8.16 and 12.24 billion dollars.

GDP in 2023 international dollars
Year	Roman/Byzantine Empire	per capita	GDP (% World)	Population	Population (% World)
14	25,100,000,000	570	24	44,000,000	20
1000	8,160,000,000	680	6.8	12,000,000	4.5

== See also ==
- Exploitation colonialism
- List of countries by largest historical GDP
