= List of regions by past GDP (PPP) per capita =

These are lists of regions and countries by their estimated real gross domestic product (GDP) per capita in terms of purchasing power parity (PPP), the value of all final goods and services produced within a country/region in a given year divided by population size. GDP per capita dollar (international dollar) estimates here are derived from PPP estimates.

== Characteristics ==
In the absence of sufficient data for nearly all economies until well into the 19th century, past GDP per capita often cannot be calculated, but only roughly estimated. A key notion in the whole process is that of subsistence, the income level which is necessary for sustaining one's life. Since pre-modern societies, by modern standards, were characterized by a very low degree of urbanization and a large majority of people working in the agricultural sector, economic historians prefer to express income in cereal units. To achieve comparability over space and time, these numbers are then converted into monetary units such as international dollars, a step which leaves a relatively wide margin of interpretation.

== World ==
=== 1–1800 (Maddison Project) ===
The Maddison Project is an international group of scholars who continue and build upon Maddison's work. In their 2020 report they concentrate on the pre-1820 period. Their revised figures show pre-industrial Europe to be richer, but its economic growth to be slower than previously thought. This is consistent with Maddison's view that the income gap to Asia was already large before the Industrial Revolution. The entirety of their GDP per capita estimates can be obtained from their online database. The following data selection they present in their published paper:

GDP (PPP) per capita in 2011 international dollars
Country / region	1	1000	1280	1348	1400	1500	1600	1661	1700	1766	1800	1850	1870	1913	1929	1937	1960	1973	1995	2018
UK		1,151	1,058	1,229	1,717	1,697	1,691	1,610	2,412	2,879	3,343	4,332	5,829	8,212	8,772	9,911	13,780	19,168	27,861	38,058
Netherlands				1,405	1,917	2,332	4,270	3,173	3,377	4,359	4,184	3,779	4,422	6,454	9,068	8,660	12,333	20,851	30,680	47,474
Belgium	956					2,338	2,533		2,192			2,944	4,291	6,727	8,056	7,908	11,081	19,399	29,370	39,756
France	956		1,321	1,846	1,795	1,694	1,610	1,677	1,694	1,710		2,546	2,990	5,555	7,508	7,152	11,792	20,441	29,419	38,516
Germany						1,827	1,286		1,497		1,572	2,276	2,931	5,815	6,457	7,468	12,282	19,074	28,869	46,178
Austria												2,630	2,970	5,523	5,896	5,031	10,391	17,908	29,622	42,988
Finland							1,191		1,331		1,213	1,519	1,817	3,365	4,331	5,485	9,931	17,669	25,762	38,897
Russia																	5,557	10,492	8,586	24,669
Ukraine																		7,849	5,024	9,813
Former USSR														2,254	2,209	3,437	6,288	9,658	6,888	19,539
Former Yugoslavia													878	1,551	2,002	1,868	3,778	7,226	6,286	16,558
Czech Republic																		10,026	14,550	30,749
Former Czechoslovakia												1,720	1,855	3,341	4,849	4,594	8,142	11,223	13,181	29,601
Slovenia																	7,165	15,079	17,817	29,245
Hungary													1,741		3,344	3,947	4,053	5,816	10,135	25,623
Poland					956	944	1,038	912	985	974	902	985	1,575	2,772	3,374	3,052	5,125	8,512	9,408	27,455
Italy	1,407			2,673	3,087	2,703	2,404	2,673	2,604	2,634	2,404	2,611	2,826	4,057	4,889	4,879	9,430	16,950	28,666	34,364
Spain	886		1,501	1,608	1,376	1,394	1,465		1,376		1,501	1,706	1,809	3,067	4,173	2,654	5,037	11,638	21,522	31,497
Portugal	956						1,258	1,490	1,572	2,021	1,459	1,470	1,554	1,992	2,566	2,801	4,712	11,258	19,262	27,036
Greece	1,275											1,607	1,938	1,876	3,733	4,414	5,015	12,202	17,148	23,451
Turkey	897	768		743		768							1,165	1,473	1,554	2,066	3,041	5,050	9,963	19,270
Egypt	1,116		1,068		1,164	1,084							1,195	1,674			1,580	2,063	5,001	11,957
Iraq	1,116	1,307											956	1,275			4,360	5,982	1,997	12,836
Jordan	1,116												1,116	1,594			3,714	3,806	6,760	11,506
Iran	1,116												956	1,275			3,437	8,706	7,094	17,011
Indonesia												724	810	1,361	1,702	1,694	1,613	2,375	5,495	11,852
India							1,264		1,162		1,033	947		1,073	1,160	1,078	1,200	1,360	2,356	6,806
China		1,225			1,404	1,207	1,217	1,330	1,543	991	926	858	945	985	1,003	1,034	1,057	1,513	4,000	13,102
South Korea													820	1,171	1,496	2,006	1,548	3,822	19,089	37,928
Japan		1,010	841				1,061		1,073		1,317	1,436	1,580	2,431	3,665	4,075	3,062	18,226	31,887	38,674
United States											2,545	3,632	4,803	10,108	11,954	11,295	18,057	26,602	39,391	55,335
Canada												2,120	2,702	7,088	8,074	7,130	13,952	22,058	31,331	44,869
Mexico							799	1,181	1,476	1,404	1,305	1,054	1,046	2,004	2,424	2,482	4,723	7,597	9,945	16,494
Haiti																	1,809	1,678	1,379	1,729
Cuba											579	888		2,120	2,507	2,042	2,994	3,486	2,861	8,326
Brazil												867	1,084	1,046	1,465	1,610	3,398	6,086	8,952	14,034
Venezuela											1,073	1,884	1,769	1,750	2,942	3,885	12,116	15,540	14,448	10,710
Chile											853	1,352	1,868	4,836	5,679	5,083	6,781	7,911	13,716	22,105
Argentina											1,484	1,994	2,340	6,052	6,961	6,575	6,575	12,691	13,086	18,556
South Africa									2,715	2,071	1,529	1,042	1,286	1,835	3,249	3,249	4,847	6,655	6,406	12,166
Australia												3,148	5,217	8,220	8,389	9,159	14,013	20,527	30,690	49,831

=== 1–2008 (Maddison) ===
The following estimates are taken exclusively from the 2007 monograph Contours of the World Economy, 1–2030 AD by the British economist Angus Maddison.

GDP (PPP) per capita in 1990 international dollars
Country / region	1	1000	1500	1600	1700	1820	1870	1913	1950	1973	1989	2008
Austria	425	425	707	837	993	1,218	1,863	3,465	3,706	11,235	16,360	24,131
Belgium	450	425	875	976	1,144	1,319	2,692	4,220	5,462	12,170	16,744	23,655
Denmark	400	400	738	875	1,039	1,274	2,003	3,912	6,943	13,945	18,261	24,621
Finland	400	400	453	538	638	781	1,140	2,111	4,253	11,085	16,946	24,344
France	473	425	727	841	910	1,135	1,876	3,485	5,271	13,114	17,300	22,223
Germany	408	410	688	791	910	1,077	1,839	3,648	3,881	11,966	16,558	20,801
Italy	809	450	1,100	1,100	1,100	1,117	1,499	2,564	3,502	10,634	15,969	19,909
Netherlands	425	425	761	1,381	2,130	1,838	2,757	4,049	5,996	13,082	16,695	24,695
Norway	400	400	610	664	723	801	1,360	2,447	5,430	11,323	18,157	28,500
Sweden	400	400	695	824	977	1,198	1,662	3,096	6,739	13,493	17,710	24,409
Switzerland	425	410	632	750	890	1,090	2,102	4,266	9,064	18,204	20,935	25,104
United Kingdom	400	400	714	974	1,250	1,706	3,190	4,921	6,939	12,025	16,414	23,742
12 country average	599	425	798	907	1,032	1,243	2,087	3,688	5,018	12,157	16,751	22,246
Portugal	450	425	606	740	819	923	975	1,250	2,086	7,063	10,372	14,436
Spain	498	450	661	853	853	1,008	1,207	2,056	2,189	7,661	11,582	19,706
Other	539	400	472	525	584	711	1,027	1,840	2,538	7,614	10,822	19,701
West European average	576	427	771	889	997	1,202	1,960	3,457	4,578	11,417	15,800	21,672
Eastern Europe	412	400	496	548	606	683	937	1,695	2,111	4,988	5,905	8,569
Former USSR	400	400	499	552	610	688	943	1,488	2,841	6,059	7,112	7,904
United States	400	400	400	400	527	1,257	2,445	5,301	9,561	16,689	23,059	31,178
Other Western offshoots	400	400	400	400	408	761	2,244	4,752	7,425	13,399	16,724	23,073
Average Western offshoots	400	400	400	400	476	1,202	2,419	5,233	9,268	16,179	22,255	30,152
Mexico	400	400	425	454	568	759	674	1,732	2,365	4,853	5,899	7,979
Other Latin America	400	400	410	431	502	661	677	1,438	2,531	4,435	4,203	5,750
Latin American average	400	400	416	438	527	691	676	1,493	2,503	4,513	5,131	6,973
Japan	400	425	500	520	570	669	737	1,387	1,921	11,434	17,943	22,816
China	450	450	600	600	600	600	530	552	448	838	1,834	6,725
India^{[A]}	450	450	550	550	550	533	533	673	619	853	1,270	2,975
Other East Asia	425	425	554	564	561	568	594	842	771	1,485	2,528	4,696
West Asia	522	621	590	591	591	607	742	1,042	1,776	4,854	4,590	6,947
Asian average (excl. Japan)	457	466	572	576	572	577	548	658	639	1,225	2,683	5,611
Africa	472	425	414	422	421	420	500	637	890	1,410	1,444	1,780
World	467	450	566	596	616	667	873	1,526	2,113	4,091	5,130	7,614
Country / region	1	1000	1500	1600	1700	1820	1870	1913	1950	1973	1989	2008

A From 1 AD to 1913 AD, India includes modern Pakistan and Bangladesh. From 1950 onwards, India refers only to the modern Republic of India.

Maddison's assumptions have been criticized and admired by academics and journalists. Bryan Haig has characterized Maddison's figures for 19th century Australia as "inaccurate and irrelevant", John Caldwell's assessed Maddison's arguments as having a "dangerous circularity", and W. W. Rostow said, "this excessive macroeconomic bias also causes him (Maddison) to mis-date, in my view, the beginning of what he calls the capitalist era at 1820 rather than, say, the mid-1780s."

A number of economic historians have criticized Maddison's estimates for Asia. For example, W. J. MacPherson has described Maddison's work on India and Pakistan of using "dubious comparative data." Paul Bairoch has criticized Maddison's work for underestimating the per-capita incomes of non-European regions, particularly in Asia, before the 19th century; according to Bairoch, per-capita income in Asia (especially China and India) was higher than in Europe prior to the 19th century. Others such as Andre Gunder Frank, Robert A. Denemark, Kenneth Pomeranz and Amiya Kumar Bagchi have criticized Maddison for grossly underestimating per-capita income and GDP growth rates in Asia (again, mainly China and India) for the three centuries up to 1820, and for refusing to take into account contemporary research demonstrating significantly higher per-capita income and growth rates in Asia. According to Frank and Denemark, his per-capita income figures for Asia up to 1820 are not credible, go "against what we know from sources" and may need to be adjusted by a factor of two. Maddison's estimates have also been critically reviewed and revised by the Italian economists Giovanni Federico and Elio Lo Cascio/Paolo Malanima (see below).

However, economist and journalist Evan Davis has praised Maddison's research by saying that it a "fantastic publication" and "based on the detailed scholarship of the world expert on historical economic data Angus Maddison." He added, "One shouldn't read the book in the belief the statistics are accurate to 12 decimal places."

=== 1750–1990 (Bairoch) ===
In his 1995 book Economics and World History, economic historian Paul Bairoch gave the following estimates in terms of 1960 US dollars, for GNP per capita from 1750 to 1990, comparing what are today the Third World (part of Asia, Africa, Latin America) and the First World (Western Europe, Northern America, Japan, Singapore and South Korea).

GNP (PPP) per capita in US dollars
Year	1960 dollars		1990 dollars	
Year	Third World^{[A]}	First World^{[B]}	Third World^{[A]}	First World^{[B]}
1750	188	182	830	804
1800	188	198	830	874
1830	183	237	808	1,047
1860	174	324	768	1,431
1900	175	540	773	2,385
1913	192	662	848	2,924
1928	194	782	857	3,453
1938	202	856	892	3,780
1950	214	1,180	945	5,211
1970	340	2,540	1,502	11,217
1980	390	2,920	1,722	12,895
1990	430	3,490	1,899	15,413

According to Bairoch, in the mid-18th century, "the average standard of living in Europe was a little bit lower than that of the rest of the world." He noted variations within both groups in 1750, citing the Asian civilizations of China and India as being the wealthiest among the Third World group, and Russia and Eastern/Southeastern Europe as being the poorest among the First World group. He estimated that, in 1750, the average per-capita income of the East (Asia and Africa) was roughly equal to that of Western Europe, and that China's per-capita income was on-par with the leading European economies. He estimated that it was after 1800 that Western European per-capita income pulled ahead of the East. China was still ahead in 1800; his GNP per capita estimates for 1800, in terms of 1960 dollars, are $228 for China ($1,007 in 1990 dollars) and $213 for Western Europe ($941 in 1990 dollars). But China fell behind not long after, falling to $204 ($901 in 1990 dollars) by 1860.

== China ==
Economic historians Angus Maddison, Stephen Broadberry, Hanhui Guan, David Daokui, Li Jutta Bolt, Robert Inklaar, Yi Xu, Zhihong Shi, Bas van Leeuwen, Yuping Ni, Zipeng Zhang, and Ye Ma have offered differing estimates of historic productivity in region, but show a similar trend of a decline between the beginning of the 17th and middle of the 20th centuries, before recovering:

Estimated GDP (PPP) per capita in 1990 international dollars
Authors	1	980	1000	1020	1060	1090	1120	1400	1450	1500	1570	1600	1650	1661	1685	1700	1724	1750	1766	1800	1812	1820	1840	1850	1870	1887	1911	1913	1933	1950
Broadberry (2016)		853		1,006	982	878	863	1032	990	858	885	865				1,103		727		614			599	600						
Xu (2015)														852	820		751		622		565			538		572	568		579	
Maddison (2009)	450		450							600			600					600		600					530			552		448
Maddison Project (2018) cgdppc (Note: Exchange rate of 1 ($ 1990) : 1.721 ($ 2011))														546					399		363	431		374	436	442	467	512	515	440
Maddison Project (2018) rgdpnapc														629					460		417	496		397	438	422	420	457	428	370

== Europe ==
=== Europe 1830–1938 (Bairoch) ===
Evolution of the GDP per capita for selected European countries between 1830 and 1890, according to Bairoch

The following estimates were made by the economic historian Paul Bairoch. Unlike other estimates on this page, the GNP (PPP) per capita is given here in 1960 US dollars. Unlike Maddison, Bairoch allows for the fluctuation of borders, basing his estimates mostly on the historical boundaries at the given points in time.

GNP (PPP) per capita in 1960 US dollars
Country / region	1830	1840	1850	1860	1870	1880	1890	1900	1910	1913	1925	1938
Austria	-	-	-	-	-	-	-	-	-	-	655	640
Austria-Hungary	250	266	283	288	305	315	361	414	469	498	-	-
Baltic countries	-	-	-	-	-	-	-	-	-	-	443	501
Belgium	295	345	411	490	571	589	630	721	854	894	985	1015
Bulgaria	-	-	-	210	220	210	250	260	270	263	304	420
Czechoslovakia	-	-	-	-	-	-	-	-	-	-	504	548
Denmark	208	225	256	294	340	396	502	633	739	862	845	1045
Finland	188	205	227	241	313	327	368	425	451	520	578	913
France	264	302	333	365	437	464	515	604	680	689	893	936
Germany	245	267	308	354	426	443	537	639	705	743	712	1126
Greece	-	200	215	230	250	260	290	300	325	322	393	590
Hungary	-	-	-	-	-	-	-	-	-	-	365	451
Ireland	-	-	-	-	-	-	-	-	-	-	624	649
Italy	265	270	277	301	312	311	311	335	366	441	480	551
Netherlands	347	382	427	452	506	542	586	614	705	754	909	920
Norway	280	305	350	401	421	464	523	577	673	749	863	1298
Poland	-	-	-	-	-	-	-	-	-	-	245	372
Portugal	250	255	260	275	270	270	270	287	290	292	320	351
Romania	-	-	190	200	210	230	246	275	307	336	316	343
Russia/USSR	170	170	175	178	250	224	182	248	287	326	232	458
Serbia	-	-	-	220	230	240	250	260	282	284	-	-
Spain	263	288	313	346	329	323	321	351	370	367	426	337
Sweden	194	198	211	225	246	303	356	454	593	680	765	1097
Switzerland	276	315	391	480	549	676	705	785	895	964	1020	1204
United Kingdom	346	394	458	558	628	680	785	881	904	965	970	1181
Yugoslavia	-	-	-	-	-	-	-	-	-	-	302	339
Europe	240	260	283	310	359	366	388	455	499	534	515	671
Western Europe	276	-	-	384	-	-	-	583	-	678	710	839
Eastern Europe	190	-	-	214	-	-	-	314	-	389	315	509
Country / region	1830	1840	1850	1860	1870	1880	1890	1900	1910	1913	1925	1938

=== Western Europe 1–1870 (Lo Cascio/Malanima) ===
The following estimates are taken from a revision of Angus Maddison's numbers for Western Europe by the Italian economists Elio Lo Cascio and Paolo Malanima. According to their calculations, the basic level of European GDP (PPP) per capita was historically higher, but its increase was less pronounced.

GDP (PPP) per capita in 1990 international dollars
Authors	1	1000	1500	1600	1700	1820	1870
Lo Cascio/Malanima	1,000	900	1,350	1,250	1,400	1,350	1,960
Maddison	576	427	771	889	997	1,202	1,960

== Indian subcontinent ==
According to some evidence cited by the economic historians Immanuel Wallerstein, Irfan Habib, Percival Spear, and Ashok Desai, has theorised that per-capita agricultural output and standards of consumption in 17th-century Mughal India was on-par with 17th-century Europe and early 20th-century British India.

According to economic historians Prasannan Parthasarathi and Jeffrey G. Williamson, earnings data from primary sources show that mid-late 18th-century real wages and living standards in Bengal sultanate (under the Nawabs of Bengal) a South Indian Kingdom of Mysore and Maratha Empire were higher than in Britain, which in turn had the highest living standards in Europe. The economic historian Sashi Sivramkrishna estimates Mysore's average income for skilled laborers in the late 18th century to be five times higher than subsistence leval Parthasarathi also slates the real wage decline occurred in the early 19th century, or possibly beginning in the very late 18th century, under British rule.

Economic historians Angus Maddison, Stephen Broadberry, Johann Custodis, Bishnupriya Gupta, Jutta Bolt, Robert Inklaar, Herman de Jong and Jan Luiten van Zanden have offered differing estimates of historic productivity in region, but show a similar trend of a decline between the beginning of the 17th and middle of the 19th centuries, before recovering:

GDP (PPP) per capita in 1990 international dollars
Authors	1	1000	1500	1600	1650	1700	1750	1800	1820	1850	1870	1900	1930	1950
Broadberry & Gupta (2010)				782	736	719	661	639	580	586	526			
Broadberry & Gupta (2015)				682	638	622	573	569	520	556	526			
Maddison Project (2020)				735	691	676	621	601	545	551	494	555	673	574
Maddison Project (2018)				758	714	697	641	620	562	568	510	657	898	823
Maddison (2009)	450	450	550	550		550			533	533	533	599	726	619

== Ottoman Egypt ==
According to economic historian Jean Batou, Ottoman Egypt's average per-capita income in 1800 was comparable to that of leading Western European countries such as France, and higher than the overall average income of Europe and Japan. Barou estimated that, in terms of 1960 US dollars, Egypt in 1800 had a per-capita income of $232 ($1,025 in 1990 dollars). In comparison, per-capita income in terms of 1960 dollars for France in 1800 was $240 ($1,060 in 1990 dollars), for Eastern Europe in 1800 was $177 ($782 in 1990 dollars), and for Japan in 1800 was $180 ($795 in 1990 dollars).

== Roman and Byzantine Empires ==
Much of the recent work in estimating past GDP per capita has been done in the study of the Roman economy, following the pioneering studies by Keith Hopkins (1980) and Raymond Goldsmith (1984). The estimates by Peter Temin, Angus Maddison, Branko Milanovic and Peter Fibiger Bang follow the basic method established by Goldsmith, varying mainly only in their set of initial numbers; these are then stepped up to estimations of the expenditure checked by those on the income side. Walter Scheidel/Steven Friesen determine GDP per capita on the relationship between certain significant economic indicators which were historically found to be plausible; two independent control assumptions provide the upper and lower limit of the probable size of the Roman GDP per capita.

Estimates of Roman GDP (PPP) per capita
Unit		Goldsmith 1984	Hopkins 1995/96	Temin 2006	Maddison 2007	Milanovic 2007	Bang 2008	Scheidel/Friesen 2009	Lo Cascio/Malanima 2009
Approx. year		14 AD	14 AD	100 AD	14 AD	14 AD	14 AD	150 AD	150 AD
GDP (PPP) per capita in	Sesterces	HS 380	HS 225	HS 166	HS 380	HS 380	HS 229	HS 260	HS 380
GDP (PPP) per capita in	Wheat equivalent	843 kg	491 kg	614 kg	843 kg	–	500 kg	680 kg	855 kg
GDP (PPP) per capita in	1990 international dollars	–	–	–	$570	$633	–	$620	$940

Italia is considered the richest region, due to tax transfers from the provinces and the concentration of elite income in the heartland; its GDP per capita is estimated at having been around 40% to 66% higher than in the rest of the empire.

The GDP per capita of the Byzantine Empire, the continuation of the Roman Empire in the east, has been estimated by the World Bank economist Branko Milanovic to range between $680 and 770 (in 1990 international dollars) at its peak around 1000 AD, the reign of Basil II. This is 1.7 times the subsistence level as compared to the slightly higher value of 2.1 for the Roman Empire under Augustus (30 BC–14 AD).

== See also ==
- List of countries by GDP (PPP) per capita

== Bibliography ==
GDP per capita of the Roman Empire

- Bang, Peter Fibiger (2008): The Roman Bazaar: A Comparative Study of Trade and Markets in a Tributary Empire, Cambridge University Press, ISBN 0-521-85532-2, pp. 86–91
- Goldsmith, Raymond W. (1984): "An Estimate of the Size and Structure of the National Product of the Early Roman Empire", Review of Income and Wealth, Vol. 30, No. 3, pp. 263–288
- Hopkins, Keith (1980): "Taxes and Trade in the Roman Empire (200 B.C.–A.D. 400)", The Journal of Roman Studies, Vol. 70, pp. 101–125
- Hopkins, Keith (1995/6): "Rome, Taxes, Rents, and Trade", Kodai, Vol. 6/7, pp. 41–75
- Milanovic, Branko; Lindert, Peter H.; Williamson, Jeffrey G. (Oct. 2007): "Measuring Ancient Inequality’, NBER Working Paper 13550, pp. 58–66
- Scheidel, Walter; Friesen, Steven J. (Nov. 2009): "The Size of the Economy and the Distribution of Income in the Roman Empire", The Journal of Roman Studies, Vol. 99, pp. 61–91
- Temin, Peter (2006): "Estimating GDP in the Early Roman Empire", Lo Cascio, Elio (ed.): Innovazione tecnica e progresso economico nel mondo romano, Edipuglia, Bari, ISBN 978-88-7228-405-6, pp. 31–54

GDP per capita of the Byzantine Empire

- Milanovic, Branko (2006): "An Estimate of Average Income and Inequality in Byzantium around Year 1000", Review of Income and Wealth, Vol. 52, No. 3, pp. 449–470

European GDP per capita

- Bairoch, Paul (1976): "Europe's Gross National Product: 1800–1975", Journal of European Economic History, Vol. 5, pp. 273–340

Angus Maddison — reviews and revisions

- Maddison, Angus (2006): The World Economy. A Millennial Perspective (Vol. 1). Historical Statistics (Vol. 2), OECD, ISBN 92-64-02261-9
- Maddison, Angus (2007): "Contours of the World Economy, 1–2030 AD. Essays in Macro-Economic History", Oxford University Press, ISBN 978-0-19-922721-1, p. 382, table A.7.
- Federico, Giovanni (2002): "The World Economy 0–2000 AD: A Review Article", European Review of Economic History, Vol. 6, No. 1, pp. 111–120 — review
- Lo Cascio, Elio; Malanima, Paolo (Dec. 2009): "GDP in Pre-Modern Agrarian Economies (1–1820 AD). A Revision of the Estimates", Rivista di storia economica, Vol. 25, No. 3, pp. 391–420 — critique of Maddison's estimates
- Bolt, Jutta; Van Zanden, Jan Luiten (2014): "The Maddison Project: Collaborative Research on Historical National Accounts", The Economic History Review, Vol. 67, No. 3, pp. 627–651
