= Malanima =

Malanima is an Italian surname. Notable people with the surname include:

- Nada Malanima (born 1953), Italian singer, better known as Nada (Italian singer)
- Paolo Malanima (born 1950), Italian economic historian
