= World Economy (disambiguation) =

The world economy, or global economy, is the economy of the world.

World Economy may also refer to:

- The World Economy (journal), an academic journal
- The World Economy: Historical Statistics, a book by Angus Maddison
