= Elio Lo Cascio =

Italian historian (1948–2026)

- Born: 31 May 1948; Palermo, Italy
- Died: 6 September 2026 (aged 78)
- Education: Sapienza University of Rome
- Scientific career
- Fields: Historian
- Workplaces: Sapienza University of Rome

Elio Lo Cascio (31 May 1948 – 6 September 2026) was an Italian historian and teacher of Roman history at the Sapienza University of Rome. Lo Cascio's main research interests are the institutional, administrative, social and economic history of Ancient Rome from the Republic to the Late Empire, and Roman population history.

== Life and career ==
Lo Cascio was born in Palermo, Sicily on 31 May 1948. He studied Classics at the Sapienza University of Rome (1966–70), where he was a pupil of Santo Mazzarino. From 1973 to 1986, he was assistant professor and then associate professor of Roman History at the Universities of Rome and Lecce. In the years 1976–78, he spent several semesters as a visiting scholar at the University of Cambridge, where Moses I. Finley was Professor of Ancient History at the time. Between 1986 and 1990, he taught as full professor of Roman History at the University of L'Aquila, and from 1990 to 2006 at the University of Naples Federico II. He was Professor of Roman history at Sapienza University of Rome from 2006 to his retirement in 2018.

In 1993 and 2001, Lo Cascio was member of the School of Historical Studies of the Institute for Advanced Study, Princeton, and in 2009 visiting professeur at the École des Hautes Études en Sciences Sociales, Paris. As of 2010, Lo Cascio was a member of the "Consiglio direttivo" of the "Istituto Italiano per la storia antica"; he also was on the scientific committee or the editorial board of several periodicals: the Annali dell'Istituto Italiano di Numismatica, Atene e Roma, Rivista di Filologia e di Istruzione Classica, Rivista di storia economica and Studi storici. He also was the editor of the series Pragmateiai. Collana di studi e testi per la storia economica, sociale e amministrativa del mondo antico, published by Edipuglia.

Lo Cascio died on 6 September 2026, at the age of 78.

== Works ==
- Production and Public Powers in Classical Antiquity, Cambridge: Proceedings of the Cambridge Philological Association, Suppl. Vol. 26, 2000 (co-editor), ISBN 0-906014-25-5
- Il princeps e il suo impero. Studi di storia amministrativa e finanziaria romana, Bari: Edipuglia, 2000, ISBN 88-7228-265-9
- Mercati permanenti e mercati periodici nel mondo romano, Bari: Edipuglia, 2000 (editor), ISBN 88-7228-246-2
- Roma imperiale. Una metropoli antica, Roma: Carocci, 2000 (editor), ISBN 88-430-1670-9
- Credito e moneta nel mondo romano, Bari: Edipuglia, 2003 (editor), ISBN 88-7228-318-3
- Cycles and Stability. Italian Population before the Demographic Transition (225 B.C. – A.D. 1900), Rivista di Storia Economica, Vol. 21, No. 3, 2005, pp. 197–232 (co-author), ISSN 0393-3415
- Innovazione tecnica e progresso economico nel mondo romano, Bari: Edipuglia, 2006 (editor), ISBN 978-88-7228-405-6
- The Early Roman Empire: The State and the Economy, in Scheidel, Walter; Morris Ian; Saller, Richard (eds.), The Cambridge Economic History of the Greco-Roman World, Cambridge: Cambridge University Press, 2007, pp. 619–647, ISBN 978-0-521-78053-7
- Forme di aggregazione nel mondo romano, Bari: Edipuglia, 2007 (co-editor), ISBN 978-88-7228-485-8
- Crescita e declino. Studi di storia dell’economia romana, Roma: L'Erma di Bretschneider, 2009, ISBN 978-88-8265-562-4
- Agricoltura e scambi nell'Italia tardo-repubblicana, Bari: Edipuglia, 2009 (co-editor), ISBN 978-88-7228-570-1
- L'impatto della "peste antonina", Bari: Edipuglia, 2012 (editor), ISBN 978-88-7228-638-8
- Ancient and Pre-modern Economies. GDP in Roman Empire and Early Modern Europe, in de Callataÿ, François (ed.), Quantifying the Greco-Roman Economy and Beyond, Bari: Edipuglia, 2014, pp. 229–51 (co-author), ISBN 978-88-7228-744-6

== See also ==
- Paolo Malanima
