= Roman economy =

Economy of ancient Rome

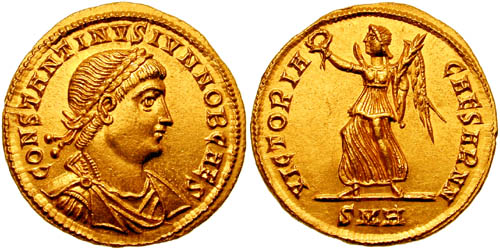
Solidus depicting Constantine II, and on the reverse Victoria, one of the last deities to appear on Roman coins, gradually transforming into an angel under Christian rule

The study of the economies of the ancient city-state of Rome and its empire during the Republican and Imperial periods remains highly speculative. There are no surviving records of business and government accounts, such as detailed reports of tax revenues, and few literary sources regarding economic activity. Instead, the study of this ancient economy is today mainly based on the surviving archeological and literary evidence that allow researchers to form conjectures based on comparisons with other more recent pre-industrial economies.

During the early centuries of the Roman Republic, it is conjectured that the economy was largely agrarian and centered on the trading of commodities such as grain and wine. Financial markets were established through such trade, and financial institutions, which extended credit for personal use and public infrastructure, were established primarily by interfamily wealth. In times of agricultural and cash shortfall, Roman officials and moneyers tended to respond by coining money, which happened during the prolonged crisis of the First Punic War and created economic distortion and difficulties.

Following the Punic Wars, during the late Republic and the early Roman Empire, the economy became more monetized and a more sophisticated financial system emerged. Emperors issued coinage stamped with their portraits to disseminate propaganda, to create public goodwill, and to symbolize their wealth and power. The Roman Imperial monetary economy often suffered bouts of inflation in part by emperors who issued money to fund high-profile imperial projects such as public building works or costly wars that offered opportunities for propaganda but little or no material gain.

Recent archaeological and quantitative research has used coin-hoard evidence to study the spatial integration of the Roman economy. One study of georeferenced Republican coin hoards dated to 155 BCE–2 CE applied spatial interaction modelling and social accounting methods to examine monetary circulation across Roman territories. It found that coin circulation was associated with settlement hierarchies, transport routes, and urban infrastructure, and that the effect of distance on circulation declined over time, a pattern linked to infrastructure expansion, administrative coordination, and monetary standardisation after the adoption of the denarius.

Emperors of the Antonine and the Severan dynasties overall debased the currency, particularly the denarius, under the pressures of meeting military payrolls. Sudden inflation during the reign of Commodus damaged the credit market. In the mid-200s, the supply of specie contracted sharply. Conditions during the Crisis of the Third Century, such as reductions in long-distance trade, the disruption of mining operations, and the physical transfer of gold coinage outside the empire by invading enemies, greatly diminished the money supply and the banking sector by the year 300. Although Roman coinage had long been fiat money or fiduciary currency, general economic anxieties came to a head under Aurelian, and bankers lost confidence in coins legitimately issued by the central government. Despite Diocletian's introduction of the gold solidus and monetary reforms, the credit market of the Empire never recovered its former robustness.

== Banking system ==
The setup of the banking system in Rome allowed the exchange of extremely large sums without the physical transfer of coins, which led to fiat money. With no central bank, a professional deposit banker (argentarius, coactor argentarius, or later nummularius) received and held deposits for a fixed or indefinite term and lent money to third parties. Generally, available capital exceeded the amount needed by borrowers and so loans were made and credit was extended on risky terms. The senatorial elite were involved heavily in private lending, as both creditors and borrowers, and made loans from their personal fortunes on the basis of social connections.

Banks of classical antiquity typically kept less in reserves than the full total of customers' deposits, as they had no incentive to ensure that customers' deposits would be insured in the event of a bank run. It was common consensus among Romans at the time, especially by Seneca's ideologies, that anyone involved in commerce should have access to credit. That tendency toward fiat money caused the money supply to fluctuate consistently.

== Mining and metallurgy ==
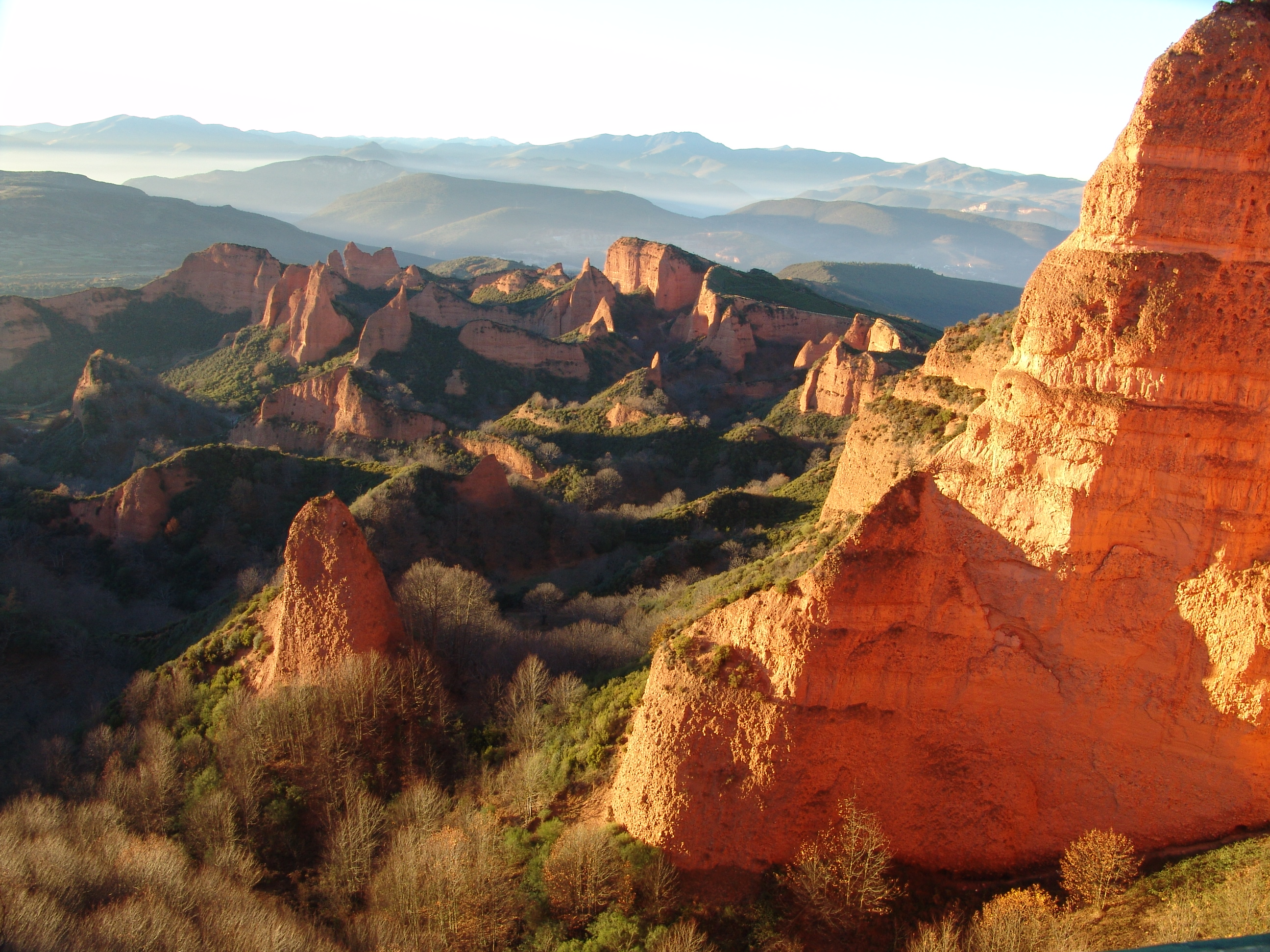
Landscape resulting from the ruina montium mining technique at Las Médulas, Roman Spain, one of the most important gold mines in the Roman Empire

The main mining regions of the Empire were Spain (gold, silver, copper, tin, lead); Gaul (gold, silver, iron); Britain (mainly iron, lead, tin), the Danubian provinces (gold, iron); Macedonia and Thrace (gold, silver); and Asia Minor (gold, silver, iron, tin). Intensive large-scale mining—of alluvial deposits, and by means of open-cast mining and underground mining—took place from the reign of Augustus up to the early 3rd century AD, when the instability of the Empire disrupted production. The gold mines of Dacia, for instance, were no longer available for Roman exploitation after the province was surrendered in 271. Mining seems to have resumed to some extent during the 4th century.

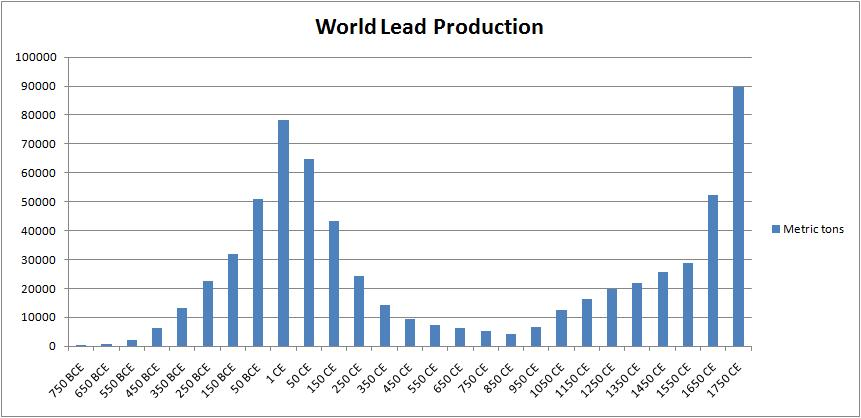
World production of lead, estimated from Greenland ice cores, peaked in the 1st century AD, and strongly declined thereafter. World production would only surpass Roman levels in the middle of the 18th century.

Hydraulic mining, which Pliny referred to as ruina montium ("ruin of the mountains"), allowed base and precious metals to be extracted on a proto-industrial scale. The total annual iron output is estimated at 82,500 tonnes. Copper was produced at an annual rate of 15,000 t, and lead at 80,000 t, both production levels unmatched until the Industrial Revolution; Spain alone had a 40 percent share in world lead production. The high lead output was a by-product of extensive silver mining which reached 200 t per annum. At its peak around the mid-2nd century AD, the Roman silver stock is estimated at 10,000 t, five to ten times larger than the combined silver mass of medieval Europe and the Abbasid Caliphate around 800 AD. As an indication of the scale of Roman metal production, lead pollution in the Greenland ice sheet quadrupled over its prehistoric levels during the Imperial era, and dropped again thereafter.

The invention and widespread application of hydraulic mining, namely hushing and ground-sluicing, aided by the ability of the Romans to plan and execute mining operations on a large scale, allowed various base and precious metals to be extracted on a proto-industrial scale only rarely, if ever, matched until the Industrial Revolution. The most common fuel by far for smelting and forging operations, as well as heating purposes, was wood and particularly charcoal, which is nearly twice as efficient. In addition, coal was mined in some regions to a fairly large extent: Almost all major coalfields in Roman Britain were exploited by the late 2nd century AD, and a lively trade along the English North Sea coast developed, which extended to the continental Rhineland, where bituminous coal was already used for the smelting of iron ore.

Annual metal production in metric tons
	Output per annum	Comment
Iron	82,500 t	Based on estimate of iron production at 1.5 kg per head in Roman Britain, extrapolated to population size of 55 million for entire empire
Copper	15,000 t	Largest preindustrial producer
Lead	80,000 t	Largest preindustrial producer
Silver	200 t	At its peak around the mid-2nd century AD, Roman stock is estimated at 10,000 t, five to ten times larger than the combined silver mass of medieval Europe and the Caliphate around 800 AD.
Gold	9 t	Production in Asturia, Callaecia, and Lusitania (all Iberian Peninsula) alone

== Transportation and communication ==
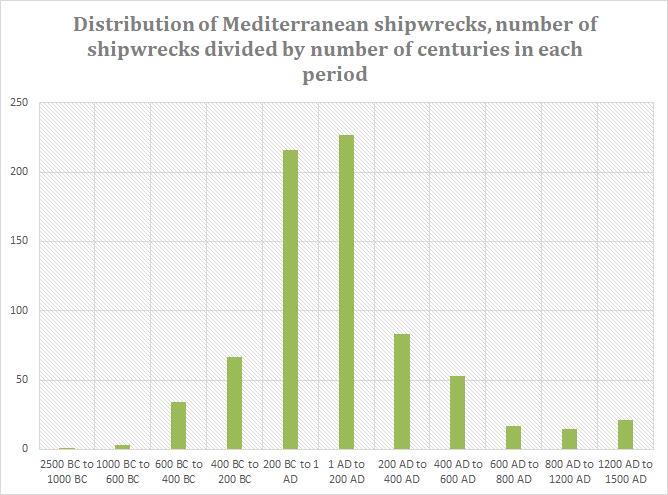
The number of dated shipwrecks discovered provides evidence of the intensity of maritime commerce in the mediterranean sea across different historical periods. One should keep in mind that ships carrying cargoes with marble and ceramic vessels are more likely to be discovered than ships carrying more perishable cargoes.

The Roman Empire completely encircled the Mediterranean, which they called "our sea" (mare nostrum). Roman sailing vessels navigated the Mediterranean as well as the major rivers of the Empire, including the Guadalquivir, Ebro, Rhône, Rhine, Tiber and Nile. Transport by water was preferred where possible, as moving commodities by land was more difficult and much more expensive: during Roman times, travel by sea was 50 to 60 times cheaper than travel by land according to Keith Hopkins. During the Roman period, sea trade in the Mediterranean reached its pre-modern peak. Vehicles, wheels, and ships indicate the existence of a great number of skilled woodworkers.

The Roman Empire in the time of Hadrian (r. 117–138), showing the network of main Roman roads

Land transport utilized the advanced system of Roman roads. The in-kind taxes paid by communities included the provision of personnel, animals, or vehicles for the cursus publicus, the state mail and transport service established by Augustus. Relay stations were located along the roads every seven to twelve Roman miles, and tended to grow into a village or trading post. A mansio (plural mansiones) was a privately run service station franchised by the imperial bureaucracy for the cursus publicus. The support staff at such a facility included muleteers, secretaries, blacksmiths, cartwrights, a veterinarian, and a few military police and couriers. The distance between mansiones was determined by how far a wagon could travel in a day. Mules were the animal most often used for pulling carts, travelling about 6.4 km/h. As an example of the pace of communication, it took a messenger a minimum of nine days to travel to Rome from Mainz in the province of Germania Superior, even on a matter of urgency. In addition to the mansiones, some taverns offered accommodations as well as food and drink; one recorded tab for a stay showed charges for wine, bread, mule feed, and the services of a prostitute.

== Trade and commodities ==
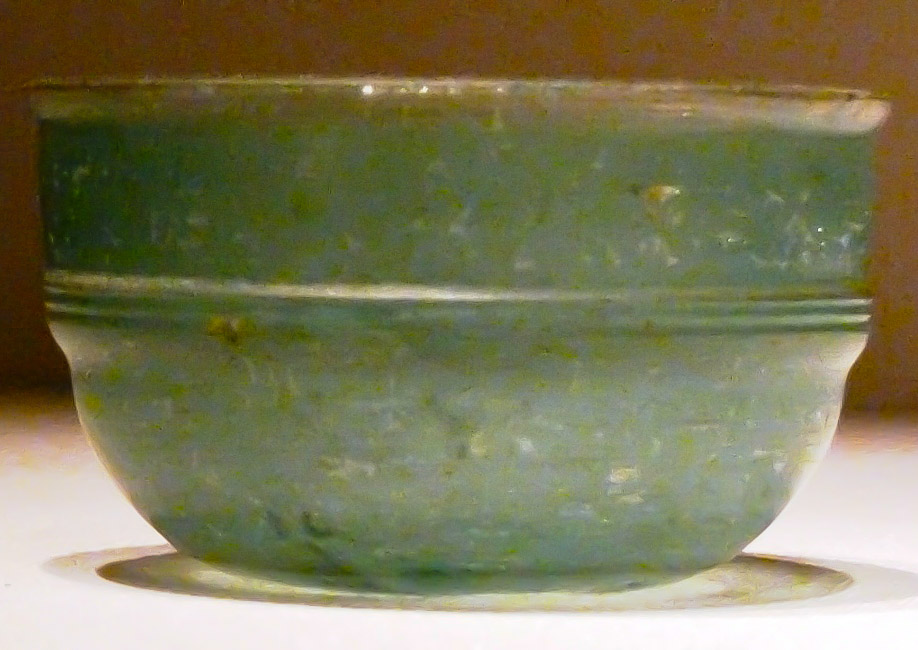
Green Roman glass cup unearthed from an Eastern Han Dynasty (25-220 AD) tomb, Guangxi, China; the first Roman glassware discovered in China, dating to the early 1st century BC, was excavated from a Western Han tomb in the southern port city of Guangzhou, most likely arriving via the Indian Ocean and South China Sea.

Roman provinces traded among themselves, but trade extended outside the frontiers to regions as far away as China and India. The main commodity was grain. Chinese trade was mostly conducted overland through middle men along the Silk Road; Indian trade, however, also occurred by sea from Egyptian ports on the Red Sea. Also traded were olive oil, various foodstuffs, garum (fish sauce), slaves, ore and manufactured metal objects, fibres and textiles, timber, pottery, glassware, marble, papyrus, spices and materia medica, ivory, pearls, and gemstones.

Though most provinces were capable of producing wine, regional varietals were desirable and wine was a central item of trade. Shortages of vin ordinaire were rare. The major suppliers for the city of Rome were the west coast of Italy, southern Gaul, the Tarraconensis region of Spain, and Crete. Alexandria, the second-largest city, imported wine from Laodicea in Syria and the Aegean. At the retail level, taverns or specialty wine shops (vinaria) sold wine by the jug for carryout and by the drink on-premises, with price ranges reflecting quality.

Trade in the early Roman Empire allowed Rome to become as vast and great as it did. Emperor Augustus, despite his intense public and private spending, took control of trade from the government and expanded Roman influence by opening new trading markets in overseas areas such as Britain, Germany, and Africa. Rome dominated trade and influence over the world in the age of the Roman Empire but could not advance in their industrial and manufacturing processes. This ultimately threatened the expanding trading and commerce industries that Augustus brought about, as well as the strong standing of the Empire in the eyes of the Romans and the world.

Whereas the Roman economy was able to thrive in the first few centuries AD thanks to its advanced trade and commerce, the boom was tempered as their ways of conducting business changed drastically. Due to Augustus and the aristocracy holding the large majority of land and wealth in Rome, trade and commerce in the basic everyday commodities began to decline. Trade began to only take place for the more luxurious commodities, effectively excluding the majority of Romans due to their poverty. Foreign trade was also incredibly significant to the rise and complexity of the Roman economy, and the Romans traded commodities such as wine, oil, grain, salt, arms, and iron to countries primarily in the West. When those countries came under decline in around 2nd century AD, and respective trade between them and the Roman Empire had to cease as a result, this put a dent in the strength of the Roman economy as foreign trade was a major factor of economic growth for the superfluously resourced Empire. Compounded with their inability to make proper production advancements to keep up with their growing and evolving economy, these events hindered Roman trade, limited their array of commodities and harmed the economy.

== Labour and occupations ==
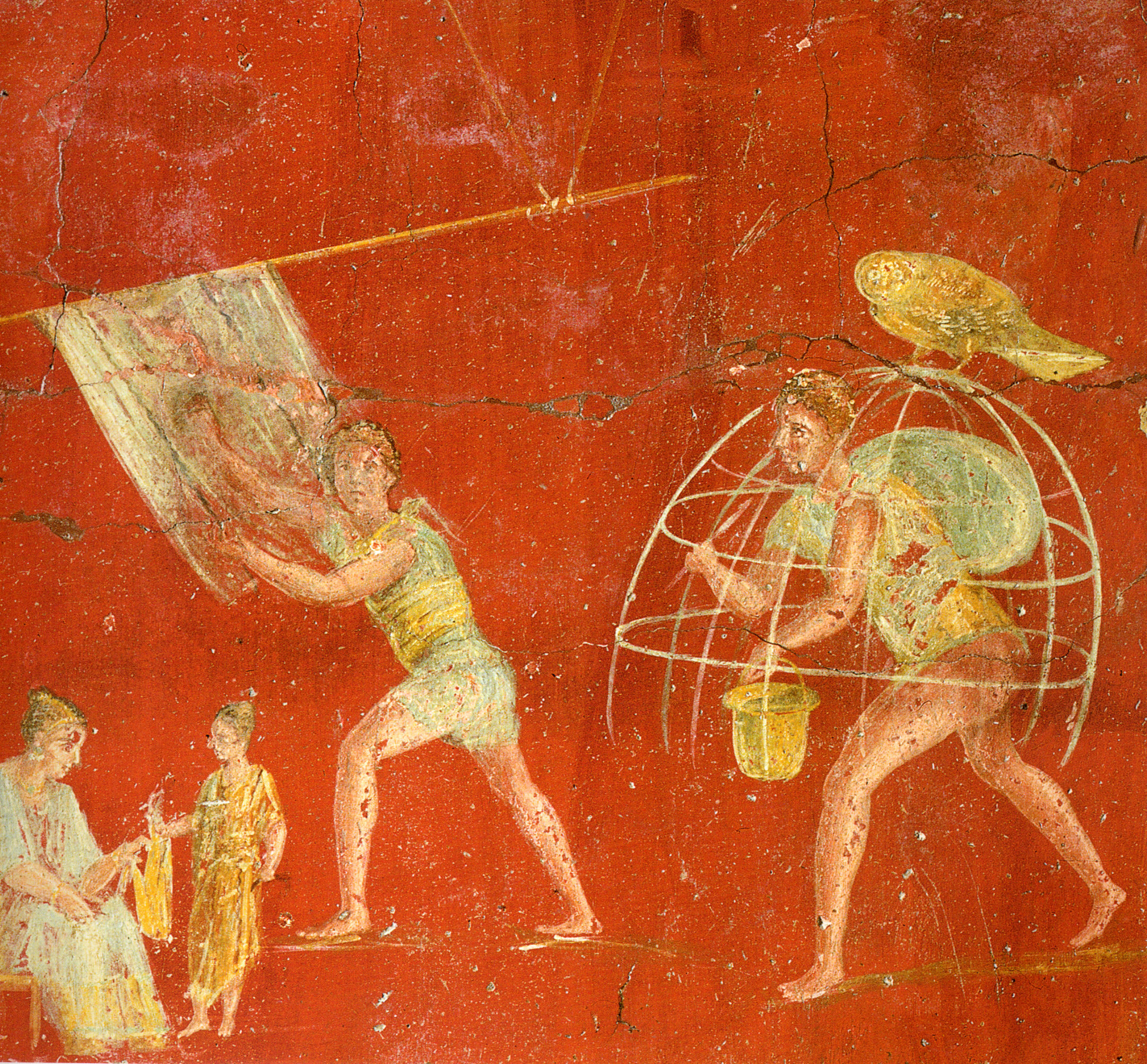
Workers at a cloth-processing shop, in a painting from the fullonica of Veranius Hypsaeus in Pompeii

Inscriptions record 268 different occupations in the city of Rome, and 85 in Pompeii. Professional associations or trade guilds (collegia) are attested for a wide range of occupations, including fishermen (piscatores), salt merchants (salinatores), olive oil dealers (olivarii), entertainers (scaenici), cattle dealers (pecuarii), goldsmiths (aurifices), teamsters (asinarii or muliones), and stonecutters (lapidarii). These are sometimes quite specialized: one collegium at Rome was strictly limited to craftsmen who worked in ivory and citrus wood.

Work performed by slaves falls into five general categories: domestic, with epitaphs recording at least 55 different household jobs; imperial or public service; urban crafts and services; agriculture; and mining. Convicts provided much of the labour in the mines or quarries, where conditions were notoriously brutal. In practice, there was little division of labour between slave and free, and most workers were illiterate and without special skills. The greatest number of common labourers were employed in agriculture: in the Italian system of industrial farming (latifundia), these may have been mostly slaves, but throughout the Empire, slave farm labour was probably less important than other forms of dependent labour by people who were technically not enslaved.

Textile and clothing production was a major source of employment. Both textiles and finished garments were traded among the peoples of the Empire, whose products were often named for them or a particular town, rather like a fashion "label". Better ready-to-wear was exported by businessmen (negotiatores or mercatores) who were often well-to-do residents of the production centres. Finished garments might be retailed by their sales agents, who travelled to potential customers, or by vestiarii, clothing dealers who were mostly freedmen; or they might be peddled by itinerant merchants. In Egypt, textile producers could run prosperous small businesses employing apprentices, free workers earning wages, and slaves. The fullers (fullones) and dye workers (coloratores) had their own guilds. Centonarii were guild workers who specialized in textile production and the recycling of old clothes into pieced goods.

== Estimates of national accounts and income distribution ==
As there are no surviving records that allow economic historians to produce reliable estimates for the national accounts of ancient Rome, thus the estimation of ancient Roman product levels remains speculative. Estimates of the gross domestic product of the Roman economy during the Principate. For the sample years of 14, 100, and 150 AD, estimates of per capita GDP range from 166 to 380 sestertii.

The Roman Empire was not uniformly developed. The GDP per capita of Italy is estimated to be higher than the average of the Empire during the Principate, due to a higher degree of urbanization and trade (partly thanks to Mediterranean access compared to the provinces in the imperial periphery), and the concentration of elite income in the heartland. Other regions next to the Mediterranean, such as the Aegean and North Africa are also thought to be more developed than the imperial average in the same period. Estimates of the difference between Italian income levels and the average for the Empire vary from 40, to 66, to 100 percent higher than in the rest of the Empire.

In the Scheidel–Friesen model of Roman national accounts, the total annual income generated by the Empire is placed at nearly 20 billion sestertii, with about 5 percent extracted by the imperial government. Households in the top 1.5 percent of income distribution captured about 20 percent of income. Another 20 percent went to about 10 percent of the population who can be characterized as a non-elite middle. The remaining "vast majority" produced more than half of the total income, but lived near subsistence. All cited economic historians stress the point that any estimate can only be regarded as a rough approximation to the realities of the ancient economy, given the general paucity of surviving pertinent data.

Based on the evidence left by the archaeological remains of the houses of the prosperous Roman town of Pompeii, Geoffrey Kron estimates that the mean household income of Pompeii was at 7,900 sestertii, a much higher amount than is implied by the GDP estimates for the whole Empire. Based on the distribution of house sizes from these archaeological remains, he also estimated a distribution of income that implies that Pompeii had a much larger middle-class than would be expected in the Scheidel–Friesen model. His estimates pointed to a level of living standards in Pompeii superior to 19th century Western Europe. He concluded that existing estimates of Roman GDP should be revised upwards.

Estimates of Roman per-capita and total GDP^{[A]}
Unit		Goldsmith 1984	Hopkins 1995/96	Temin 2006	Maddison 2007	Bang 2008	Scheidel/Friesen 2009	Lo Cascio/Malanima 2009
GDP per capita in	Sestertii	380	225	166	380	229	260	–
GDP per capita in	Wheat equivalent (kg)	843	491	614	843	500	680	–
GDP per capita in	2025 dollars	–	–	–	1,405	–	1,528	2,316
Population (Approx. year)		55 million (14 AD)	60 million (14 AD)	55 million (100 AD)	44 million (14 AD)	60 million (150 AD)	70 million (150 AD)	– (14 AD)
Total GDP in	Sestertii	20.9 billion	13.5 billion	-	16.7 billion	13.7 billion	17-19 billion	–
Total GDP in	Wheat equivalent (Mt)	46.4	29.5	33.8	37.1	30	50	–
Total GDP in	2025 dollars	–	–	–	$62 billion	–	$107 billion	–
"–" indicates unknown value.

A Decimal fractions rounded to the nearest tenth. Italic numbers not directly given by the authors; they are obtained by multiplying the respective value of GDP per capita by estimated population size.

=== Regional breakdown ===
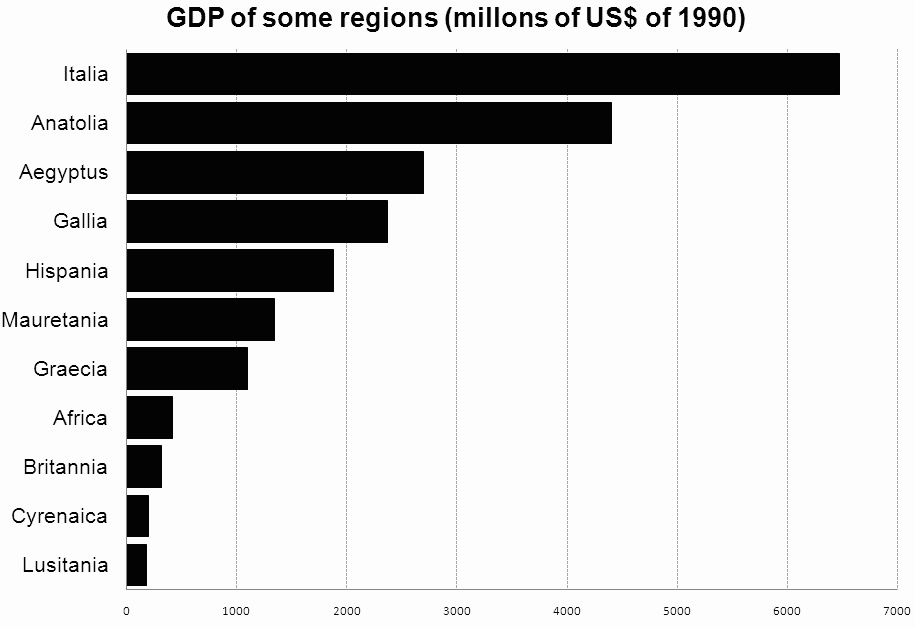
Total GDP around 1 AD for various regions of the Roman Empire

Maddison's breakdown per region (14 AD)
Region	Population (thousands)	NDI per capita (2025 dollars)	Total NDI (millions of 2025 dollars)
Roman Europe (including Italy)	23,100	1,461	33,734
Roman Europe (excluding Italy)	16,100	1,178	18,948
Roman Asia	12,200	1,355	16,536
Roman Africa	8,700	1,333	11,607
Total Roman Empire	44,000	1,405	61,877

Angus Maddison is the only economist cited who offers a detailed breakdown of the national disposable income (NDI) of the various parts of the Roman Empire. His "highly provisional" estimate (see right) relies on a low-count of the Roman population of only 44 million at the time of the death of Augustus in 14 AD. Italia is considered to have been the richest region, due to tax transfers from the provinces and the concentration of elite income in the heartland; its NDI per capita is estimated at having been between 40% and 66% higher than in the rest of the empire. Besides Italy, the wealthiest province was Egypt, in terms of NDI per capita.

The European NDI per capita was higher than in the Asian and African provinces if Italy is included, but without it, the rest of Europe had a lower NDI per capita than the Asian and African provinces. The Hellenistic Eastern provinces (Greece, Asia Minor, Syria, Egypt) were about 20% wealthier than their mostly Latin-speaking Western counterparts, with Egypt alone being about 28% wealthier. However, Italia, which was not administered as a province, enjoyed a higher per capita income than any one of them.

=== Taxation ===
Historians conjectured that imperial taxation under amounted to about 5% of the Empire's gross product. The typical tax rate paid by individuals ranged from 2 to 5%. This tax burden did not include the tax revenues levied by the local cities, called municipia in the Latin-speaking parts of the Empire and poleis in the Greek-speaking parts.

The tax code was "bewildering" in its complicated system of direct and indirect taxes, some paid in cash and some in kind. Taxes might be specific to a province, or kinds of properties such as fisheries or salt evaporation ponds; they might be in effect for a limited time. Tax collection was justified by the need to maintain the military, and taxpayers sometimes got a refund if the army captured a surplus of booty. In-kind taxes were accepted from less-monetized areas, particularly those who could supply grain or goods to army camps.

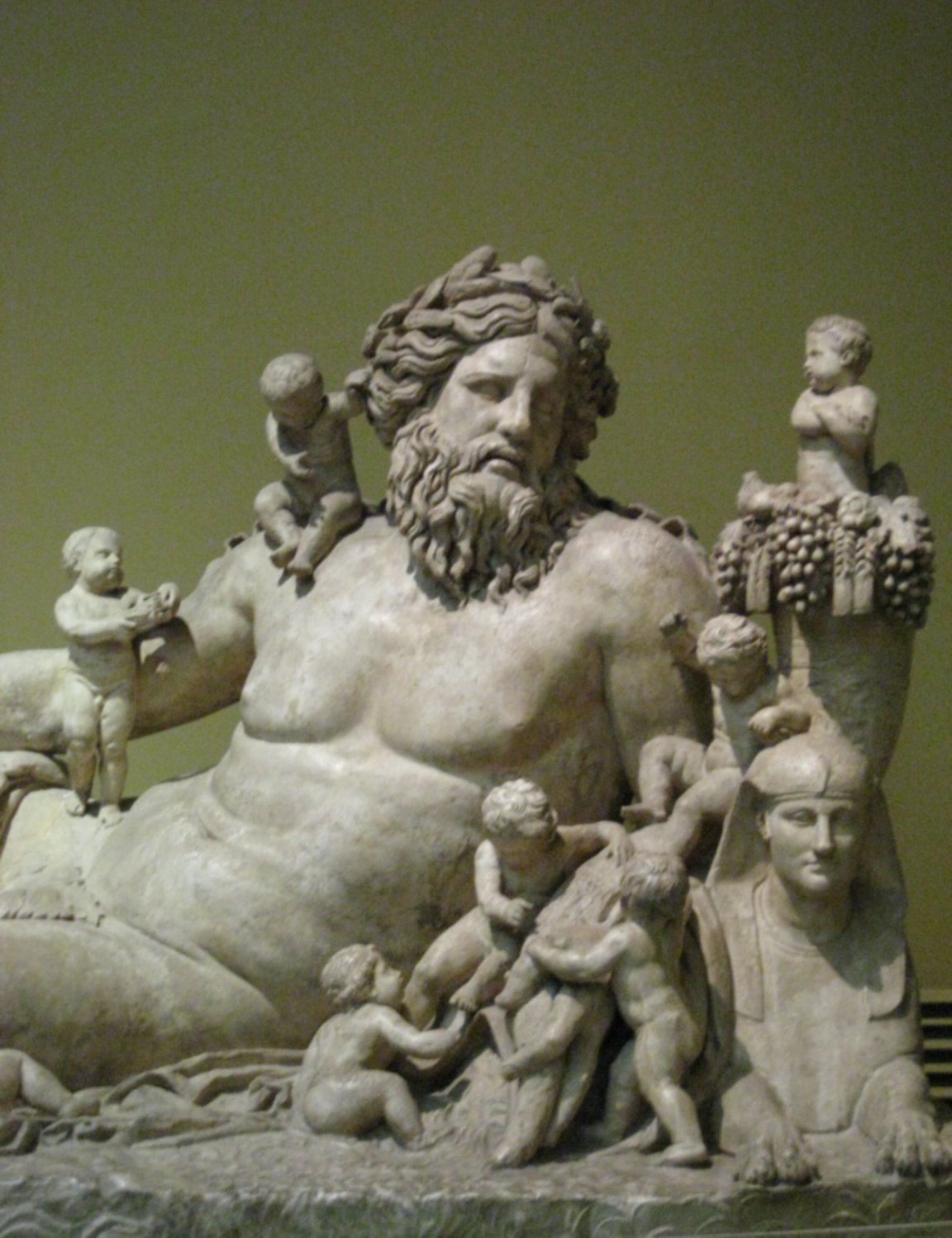
Personification of the River Nile and his children, from the Temple of Serapis and Isis in Rome (1st century AD)

The primary source of direct tax revenue was individuals, who paid a poll tax and a tax on their land, construed as a tax on its produce or productive capacity. Supplemental forms could be filed by those eligible for certain exemptions; for example, Egyptian farmers could register fields as fallow and tax-exempt depending on flood patterns of the Nile. Tax obligations were determined by the Census, which required each head of household to appear before the presiding official and provide a head count of his household, as well as an accounting of property he owned that was suitable for agriculture or habitation.

A major source of indirect-tax revenue was the portoria, customs and tolls on imports and exports, including among provinces. Special taxes were levied on the slave trade. Towards the end of his reign, Augustus instituted a 4% tax on the sale of slaves, which Nero shifted from the purchaser to the dealers, who responded by raising their prices. An owner who manumitted a slave paid a "freedom tax", calculated at 5% of value.

An inheritance tax of 5% was assessed when Roman citizens above a certain net worth left property to anyone but members of their immediate family. Revenues from the estate tax and from a 1% sales tax on auctions went towards the veterans' pension fund (aerarium militare).

Low taxes helped the Roman aristocracy increase their wealth, which equalled or exceeded the revenues of the central government. An emperor sometimes replenished his treasury by confiscating the estates of the "super-rich", but in the later period, the resistance of the wealthy to paying taxes was one of the factors contributing to the collapse of the Empire.

== State revenues ==
Existing literary sources provide only fragmentary evidence regarding Roman state revenues. Some of the existing literary evidence is detailed as follows: With the conclusion of the Third Mithridatic War in 63 BC, the Roman Republic now incorporated the Kingdom of Pontus, Cilicia, most of Syria, and the island of Crete into its growing dominion, as well as turning the Kingdom of Judea into a client state. The Roman historian Plutarch records that after Pompey's return to Rome as a renowned conqueror of the east, tablets were presented showing that state revenues had increased from 50 million denarii to 85 million, an increase from 200 to 340 million sesterces from new taxes levied. Yet this was apparently roughly the size of the entire state budget of the Ptolemaic Kingdom of Hellenistic Egypt. Both Cicero and Strabo related how at the beginning of the reign of Ptolemy XII Auletes (80–51 BC) his kingdom received an annual revenue of 12,500 talents, the equivalent of 75 million denarii, or 300 million sesterces. Hence, with the Roman conquest of Egypt in the Final War of the Roman Republic (32–30 BC) and transformation of Egypt into a Roman province, one would readily assume a considerable increase in state revenues was made. The revenues garnered in Egypt in 80 BC alone was seven times the amount of tax money contemporary Roman Gaul offered to the Roman coffers following its conquest by Julius Caesar, a mere 40 million sesterces. Yet this was roughly the same amount of taxes Rome was able to levy from Egypt (i.e., 40 million sesterces) after its conquest by Octavian, bringing the total figure for state revenues up to 420 million (which included 40 million from newly conquered Egypt, 40 million from Gaul, and 340 million from all other provinces). The whole of Roman Britain after its conquest produced only about 11 million sesterces in revenues whereas the city of Alexandria in Egypt alone generated roughly 36 million sesterces. Gold mining from the Roman provinces of Hispania on the Iberian Peninsula produced roughly 80 million sesterces every year.

During the 1st century AD, the total value of imported goods form the maritime trade coming from the Indian Ocean region (including the silk and spice trade) was roughly 1,000 million sesterces, allowing the Roman state to garner 250 million sesterces of that figure in tax revenue. Even after the reduction in the number of Roman legions from about fifty to twenty-eight (500,000 down to 300,000 full-time soldiers and auxiliaries) the Roman state under Augustus still spent 640 million sesterces on military costs alone per annum (with total state expenses hovering around 1,000 million). Raoul McLaughlin stresses that "as long as international commerce thrived, the Roman Empire could meet these high-level military costs." A further 25 million sesterces in state revenues was gathered by taxing the Roman exported goods loaded on ships destined for Arabia and India (worth roughly 100 million in total).

== Advertising ==
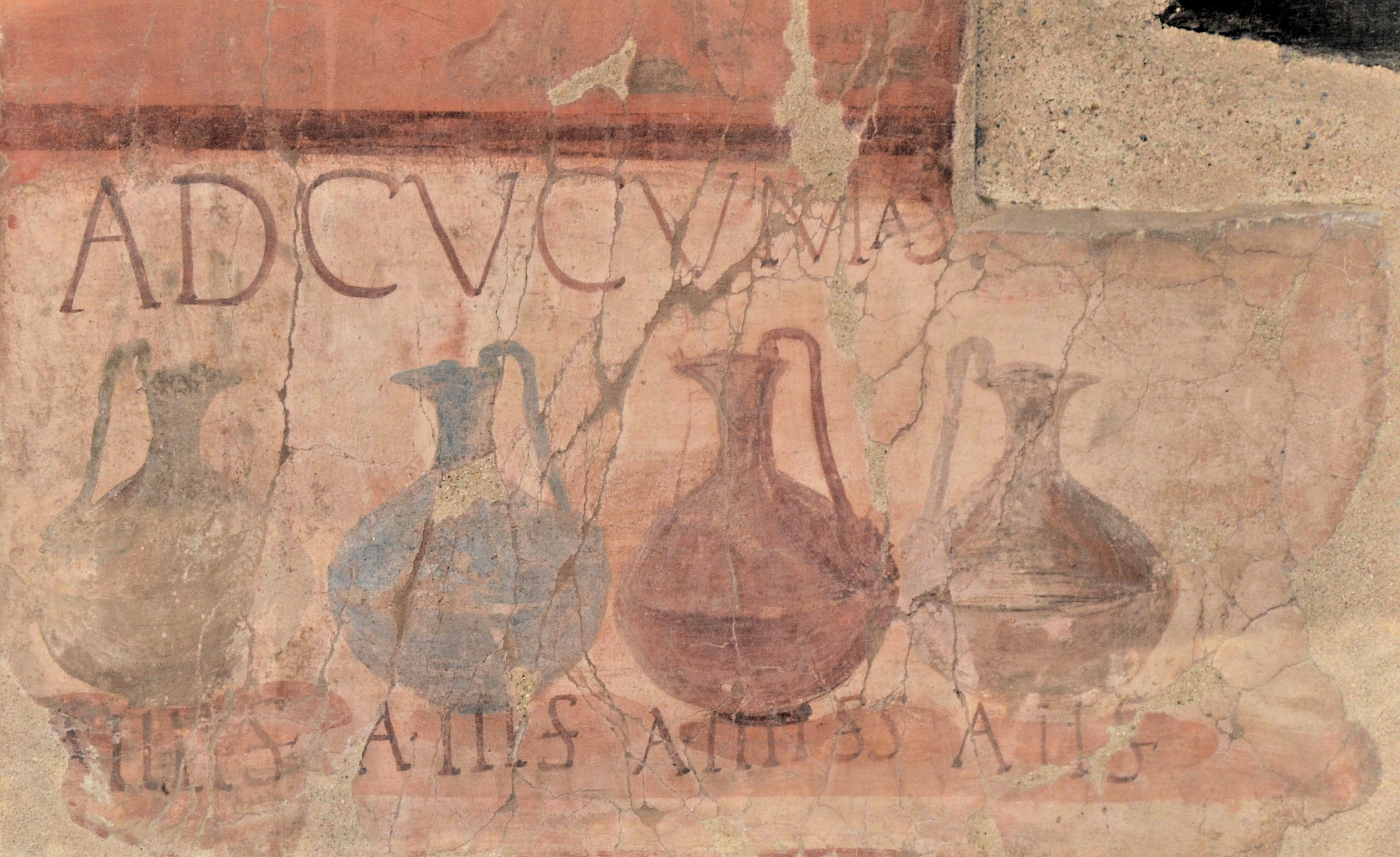
Ancient Roman advertisement for wine

In ancient Rome businesses advertised themselves primarily through word of mouth, the usage of the trade sign, and through black or red writings inscribed on surfaces. They were displayed as frescoes or mosaics. Masters would task their slaves with inscribing advertisements onto the walls of ancient Roman settlements. In ancient Rome, graffiti was the equivalent of billboards. Goods and products in ancient Rome may have carried inscriptions which were used to advertise other goods and services. Toy chariots were inscribed with the names of famous charioteers and lamps and bowls had images of famous gladiators. It was also common for merchants to advertise their brands on amphorae. These markers were known as the titulus pictus. They were used to convey information about the good and provide an easily recognizable label that attracted consumers to the product. Merchants would hire orators to spread the news of their product on the streets of the Roman cities. Wealthy businessmen would pay people to mention their business in literature.

Roman vendors could also market based on their own unique product brand. In Pompeii merchants advertised their own brands of garum, a Roman fish sauce, based on its ingredients, processing, and the manufacturer. Two known marketing slogans from Pompeii are "essence of the best mackerel" and "best available." Wine merchants in ancient Rome used positioning, which is a marketing term referring to the place a brand holds in the customer's minds. They marketed their wine as high-class.

Archaeological excavations in Pompeii revealed one advertisement that stated:

The gladiators owned by Aulus Suettius Certus will fight at Pompeii on May 31. There will be an animal hunt and awnings will be provided.

— Unknown

Advertising in ancient Rome served multiple purposes. It helped businesses market their services, it promoted politicians, and it advertised games and entertainment.

== See also ==
- Agriculture in ancient Rome
- Roman finance
- Roman currency
  - Roman Republican currency
  - Roman provincial currency
- Ancient Greek economy
- Byzantine economy

== Sources ==
- Bang, Peter Fibiger (2008): The Roman Bazaar: A Comparative Study of Trade and Markets in a Tributary Empire, Cambridge University Press, ISBN 0-521-85532-2, pp. 86–91
- Bang, Peter Fibiger (2009). "The Ancient Economy and New Institutional Economics". The Journal of Roman Studies. 99: 194–206. doi:10.3815/007543509789744783. S2CID 144103813.
- Callataÿ, François de (2005). "The Graeco-Roman Economy in the Super Long-Run: Lead, Copper, and Shipwrecks". Journal of Roman Archaeology. 18: 361–372. doi:10.1017/S104775940000742X. S2CID 232346123.
- Cech, Brigitte (2010): Technik in der Antike, Wissenschaftliche Buchgesellschaft, Darmstadt, ISBN 978-3-8062-2080-3
- Cleere, H. & Crossley, D. (1995): The Iron industry of the Weald. 2nd edition, Merton Priory Press, Cardiff, ISBN 1-898937-04-4: republishing the 1st edition (Leicester University Press 1985) with a supplement.
- Cleere, Henry. 1981. The Iron Industry of Roman Britain. Wealden Iron Research Group. p. 74-75
- Craddock, Paul T. (2008): "Mining and Metallurgy", in: Oleson, John Peter (ed.): The Oxford Handbook of Engineering and Technology in the Classical World, Oxford University Press, ISBN 978-0-19-518731-1, pp. 93–120
- Goldsmith, Raymond W. (1984). "An Estimate of the Size and Structure of the National Product of the Early Roman Empire". Review of Income and Wealth. 30 (3): 263–288. doi:10.1111/j.1475-4991.1984.tb00552.x.
- Healy, John F. (1978): Mining and Metallurgy in the Greek and Roman World, Thames and Hudson, London, ISBN 0-500-40035-0
- Hong, Sungmin; Candelone, Jean-Pierre; Patterson, Clair C.; Boutron, Claude F. (1994). "Greenland Ice Evidence of Hemispheric Lead Pollution Two Millennia Ago by Greek and Roman Civilizations". Science. 265 (5180): 1841–1843. Bibcode:1994Sci...265.1841H. doi:10.1126/science.265.5180.1841. PMID 17797222. S2CID 45080402.
- Hong, Sungmin; Candelone, Jean-Pierre; Patterson, Clair C.; Boutron, Claude F. (1996). "History of Ancient Copper Smelting Pollution During Roman and Medieval Times Recorded in Greenland Ice". Science. 272 (5259): 246–249. Bibcode:1996Sci...272..246H. doi:10.1126/science.272.5259.246. S2CID 176767223.
- Hopkins, Keith (1980). "Taxes and Trade in the Roman Empire (200 B.C.–A.D. 400)". The Journal of Roman Studies. 70: 101–125. doi:10.2307/299558. JSTOR 299558. S2CID 162507113.
- Hopkins, Keith (1995/6): "Rome, Taxes, Rents, and Trade", Kodai, Vol. 6/7, pp. 41–75
- Kron, Geoffrey (2014): “Comparative evidence and the reconstruction of the ancient economy: Greco-Roman housing and the level and distribution of wealth and income,” in F. de Callataÿ (ed.), Quantifying the Greco-Roman Economy and Beyond, 123-46. Bari: Edipuglia.
- Lo Cascio, Elio; Malanima, Paolo (2009). "GDP in Pre-Modern Agrarian Economies (1–1820 AD). A Revision of the Estimates". Rivista di storia economica. 25 (3): 391–420.
- Maddison, Angus (2007): "Contours of the World Economy, 1–2030 AD. Essays in Macro-Economic History", Oxford University Press, ISBN 978-0-19-922721-1
- Parker, A. J. (1992): "Ancient Shipwrecks of the Mediterranean and the Roman Provinces", Archaeopress (British Archaeological Reports (BAR) International S.), ISBN 0-86054-736-1
- Patterson, C. C. (1972). "Silver Stocks and Losses in Ancient and Medieval Times". The Economic History Review. 25 (2): 205–235. doi:10.2307/2593904. JSTOR 2593904.
- Scheidel, Walter (April 2006): Population and Demography, Princeton/Stanford Working Papers in Classics, Version 1.0
- Scheidel, Walter; Friesen, Steven J. (2009). "The Size of the Economy and the Distribution of Income in the Roman Empire". The Journal of Roman Studies. 99: 61–91. doi:10.3815/007543509789745223. S2CID 202968244.
- Settle, Dorothy M.; Patterson, Clair C. (1980). "Lead in Albacore: Guide to Lead Pollution in Americans". Science. 207 (4436): 1167–1176. Bibcode:1980Sci...207.1167S. doi:10.1126/science.6986654. PMID 6986654.
- Sim, David; Ridge, Isabel (2002): Iron for the Eagles. The Iron Industry of Roman Britain, Tempus, Stroud, Gloucestershire, ISBN 0-7524-1900-5
- Smith, A. H. V. (1997). "Provenance of Coals from Roman Sites in England and Wales". Britannia. 28: 297–324. doi:10.2307/526770. JSTOR 526770. S2CID 164153278.
- Temin, Peter (2006): "The Economy of the Early Roman Empire", https://www.aeaweb.org/articles?id=10.1257/089533006776526148
- Temin, Peter (2006): "Estimating GDP in the Early Roman Empire", Lo Cascio, Elio (ed.): Innovazione tecnica e progresso economico nel mondo romano, Edipuglia, Bari, ISBN 978-88-7228-405-6, pp. 31–54
- Temin, Peter (2012): "The Roman Market Economy", Princeton University Press, New Jersey, United States.
- Wilson, Andrew (2002). "Machines, Power and the Ancient Economy". The Journal of Roman Studies. 92: 1–32. doi:10.1017/s0075435800032135.
