= The World Economy: Historical Statistics =

Landmark book by Angus Maddison

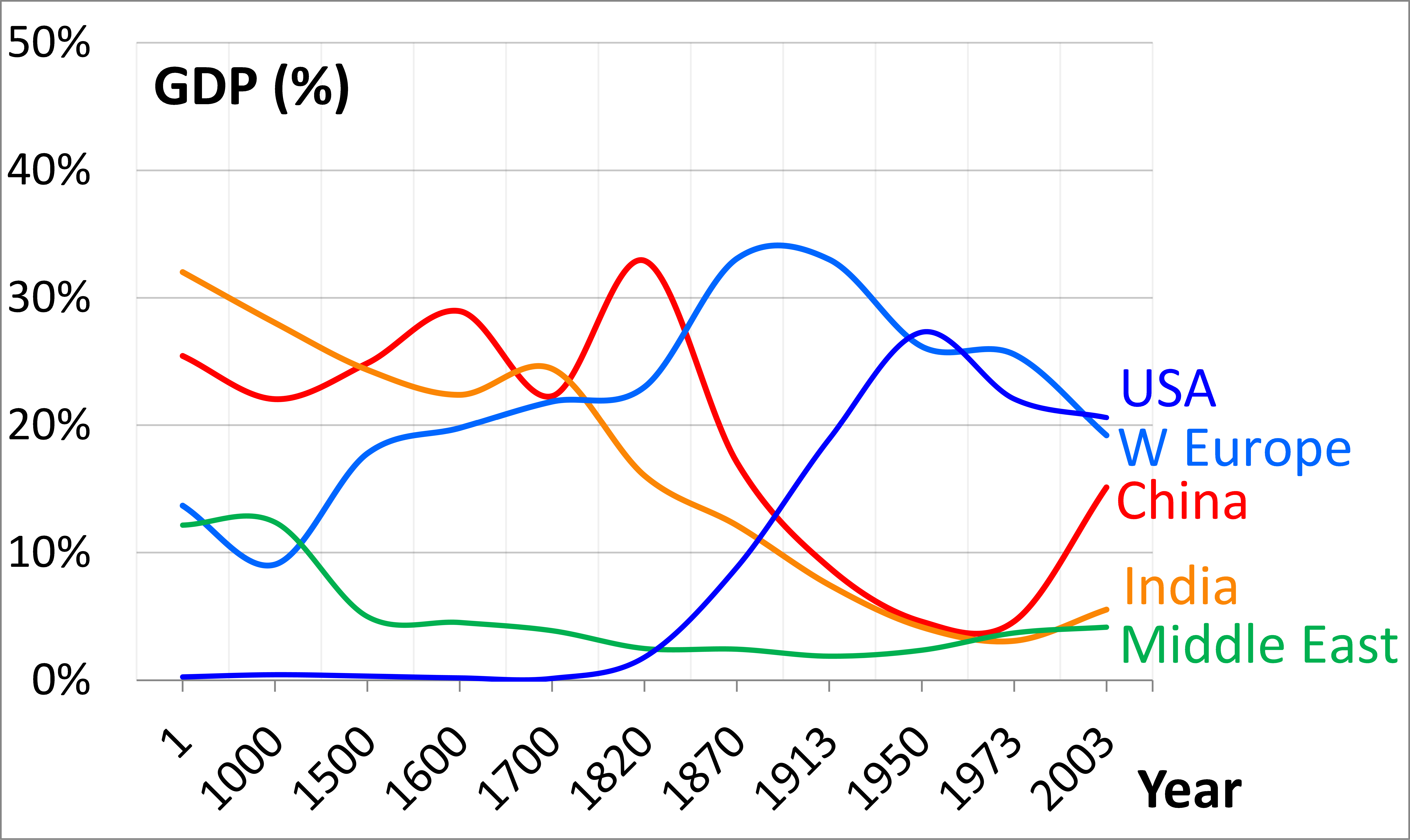
- Author: Angus Maddison
- Language: English
- Genre: Economic history
- Publisher: OECD (Organisation for Economic Co-operation and Development)
- Publication date: 2003
- Media type: Print (book)
- Pages: 274
- ISBN: 92-64-10412-7
- OCLC: 53465560
- Dewey Decimal: 330.9 22
- LC Class: HF1359 .M333 2003

The World Economy: Historical Statistics is a landmark book by Angus Maddison. Published in 2004 by the OECD Development Centre, it studies the growth of populations and economies across the centuries: not just the world economy as it is now, but how it was in the past.

Among other things, it showed that Europe's gross domestic product (GDP) per capita was faster progressing than the leading Asian economies since 1000 AD, reaching again a higher level than elsewhere from the 15th century, while Asian GDP per capita remained static until 1800, when it even began to shrink in absolute terms, as Maddison demonstrated in a subsequent book. At the same time, Maddison showed them recovering lost ground from the 1950s, and documents the much faster rise of Japan and East Asia and the economic shrinkage of Russia in the 1990s.

The book is a mass of statistical tables, mostly on a decade-by-decade basis, along with notes explaining the methods employed in arriving at particular figures. It is available both as a paperback book and in electronic format. Some tables are available on the official website.

== See also ==
- List of regions by past GDP (PPP) per capita
- Angus Maddison statistics of the ten largest economies by GDP (PPP)
- Maddison Project, a project started in March 2010 to continue Maddison's work after his death
