= Economy of the kingdom of Mysore =

The kingdom of Mysore (Kannada ಮೈಸೂರು ಸಾಮ್ರಾಜ್ಯ, ಮೈಸೂರು ಸಂಸ್ಥಾನ) (1399 - 1947 CE) was a kingdom in southern India founded in 1399 by Yaduraya in the region of the modern city of Mysore, in the Karnataka state. The Wodeyar dynasty ruled the Southern Karnataka region until Indian independence in 1947, when the kingdom was merged with the Union of India.

The peak of Mysore's economic power was under Hyder Ali and Tipu Sultan in the post-Mughal era of the mid-late 18th century. They embarked on an ambitious program of economic development, aiming to increase the wealth and revenue of Mysore.

== Early history ==
The economy of the Kingdom was based on agriculture, due to the majority of its people being villagers. Ownership of land was considered a prestige and people from all trades aimed to own a piece of land, whether they were directly involved in cultivation or not. The agrarian population consisted of landlords (gavunda, zamindar, heggadde) great and small who tilled the land by employing a number of landless labourers. Payments for services were in kind, usually grain, and even minor cultivators were willing to hire themselves out as labourers if the need arose. It was due to the availability of these landless labourers that kings and landlords were able to execute major projects such as palaces, temples, mosques, anicuts (chack dam) and tanks. Because land was abundant and the population relatively sparse, no rent was charged on land ownership. Instead, landowners paid tax for cultivation, normally amounting up to one half of all produce that was harvested.

== Under Hyder Ali and Tipu Sultan ==
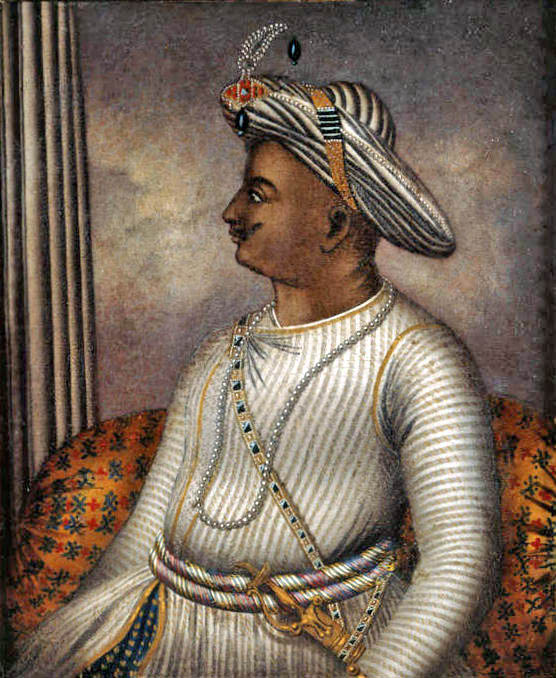
Portrait of Tipu Sultan, 1792

Tipu Sultan, who is self-styled as Sultan usurped Mysore from 1782 to 1799 is credited with founding the state trading depots in various locations the kingdom. In addition, he founded depots in foreign locations such as Karachi, Jeddah and Muscat, where Mysore products could be sold. It is to Tipu's credit that French technology was used for the first time in carpentry and smithy. Also, Tipu's time saw Chinese technology used for sugar production, while technology from Bengal helped improve the sericulture industry. State factories were established in Kanakapura and Taramandelpeth for producing cannons and gunpowder respectively. The state monopolised the production of essentials such as sugar, salt, iron, pepper, cardamom, betel nut, tobacco and sandalwood, as well as the extraction of incense oil from sandalwood and the mining of silver, gold and precious stones. Sandalwood was exported to China and the Persian gulf countries and sericulture was developed in twenty one centres within the kingdom.

A bond existed between the landlords and his labourers who were called panial or padial. In this system, when work ceased to exist in a land, the labourers were free to find employment elsewhere, but were bound to come back whenever required by the landlord. This had a mutual benefit in that it ensured regular employment to the landless and prevented their starvation. Landlords, however, were not required to increase labour rates during times when labour was in demand. Instead, they judiciously gave loans and presents to the labourer during times of need such as marriages and other family ceremonies. These loans bound the labourer to the estate who was not charged with interest on the loan. Instead, the labourer was required to pay back the principal amount only if he wished to free himself permanently from his bond to the landlord and seek employment elsewhere.

== Silk industry ==
The Mysore silk industry was first initiated during the time of Tipu. Later it was hit by a global depression, and competition from imported silk and rayon. In the second half of the 20th century, it revived and the Mysore State became the top multivoltine silk producer in India.

== British rule ==
This system changed under the British, when tax payments were in cash, and were used for the maintenance of the army, police and other civil and public establishments. A portion of the tax was transferred to England and called "Indian tribute". Unhappy with the loss of their traditional revenue system and the problems they faced, peasants rose in rebellion in many parts of south India. The construction of anicuts and tanks helped alleviate problems in some areas of the peninsula, though there were variations in living conditions in different regions.

After 1800, the Cornwallis land reforms came into play. Reade, Munro, Graham and Thackeray were some administrators who improved the economic conditions of the masses. However, the home spun textile industry suffered during British rule, due to the manufacturing mills of Manchester, Liverpool and Scotland being more than a match for the traditional hand woven industry, especially spinning and weaving. Only weavers who produced the very finest cloth not manufacturable by machines survived the changing economy. Even here, the change in the dressing habits of the people, who adapted to English clothes, had an adverse impact. Only the agricultural and rural masses with their need for coarse cloth sustained the low quality home industry. Also, the British economic policies created a class structure consisting of a newly found middle class. This class consisted of four occupational groups; the trading and merchant class consisting of agents, brokers, shopkeepers; the landlords created under the Zamindar system and Janmi system of land tenure; the money lenders; and the white collared lawyers, teachers, civil servants, doctors, journalists and bankers. However, due to a more flexible caste hierarchy, this middle class consisted of a more heterogeneous mix of people from different castes.

The 19th century brought about the so-called "backward classes movement", a direct result of the hegemony in employment (in educational and government sectors) by the wealthy few and the loss of jobs across southern India due to the Industrial Revolution in England. This movement was heralded first by the Lingayats followed by the Vokkaligas and the Kurubas. The economic revolution in England and the tariff policies of the British caused massive deindustrialization in India, especially in the textile sector. For example, Bangalore was known to have had a flourishing textile industry prior to 1800 and the gunny bag weaving business had been a monopoly of the Goniga people, a state of events that changed significantly when the British began ruling the area. The import of a chemical substitute of saltpetre (potassium nitrate) affected the Uppar community, the traditional makers of saltpetre for use in gunpowder. The import of kerosene affected the Ganiga community who supplied oils. Foreign enamel and crockery industries affected the native pottery business and the mill made blankets replaced the country made kambli. This economic fallout led to the formation of community based social welfare organizations such as the Lingayat Vidyavardhakara Sangha in Dharwad in 1883, the Vokkaligara Sanga in Bangalore in 1906 and the Praja Mitra Mandali in Mysore in 1917. The goal of these organizations was to help those within the community to cope better with a new economic situation. Community based youth hostels sprang up to help students seeking education and shelter.

== See also ==
- Economic history of India
