= Angus Maddison =

British economist (1926–2010)

- Angus Maddison
- Born: 6 December 1926; Newcastle upon Tyne, England
- Died: 24 April 2010 (aged 83); Neuilly-sur-Seine, France
- Education: University of Cambridge; University of Aix-Marseille
- Scientific career
- Fields: Economic History
- Workplaces: University of Groningen

Angus Maddison (6 December 1926 – 24 April 2010) was a British economist specialising in quantitative macro economic history, including the measurement and analysis of economic growth and development.

Maddison lectured at several universities over the course of his career, including the University of St. Andrews in Scotland and Harvard University. In 1978, Maddison was appointed Historical Professor in the Faculty of Economics at the University of Groningen (RUG). He retired in 1996 and became Emeritus Professor.

Maddison is particularly known for documenting economic performance over long periods of time and across major countries in every continent of the world.

== Early life and OEEC/OECD ==
Born in Newcastle-on-Tyne, England, Maddison was educated at Darlington Grammar School and subsequently attended Selwyn College, Cambridge, as an undergraduate. After attending McGill University and Johns Hopkins University as a graduate student, he decided not to pursue a PhD and returned to the United Kingdom to teach for a year at the University of St Andrews. He subsequently got his doctorate in 1978 at the University of Aix-Marseille in France.

In 1953, Maddison joined the Organisation for European Economic Cooperation (OEEC), and afterwards became Head of the OEEC Economics Division. In 1963, after the OEEC became the Organisation for Economic Co-operation and Development (OECD), Maddison became Assistant Director of the Economic Development Department. In 1966–71 he took leave of absence and spent the next 15 years in a series of consulting appointments during which he returned to the OECD for four years.

== Policy adviser and professorship ==
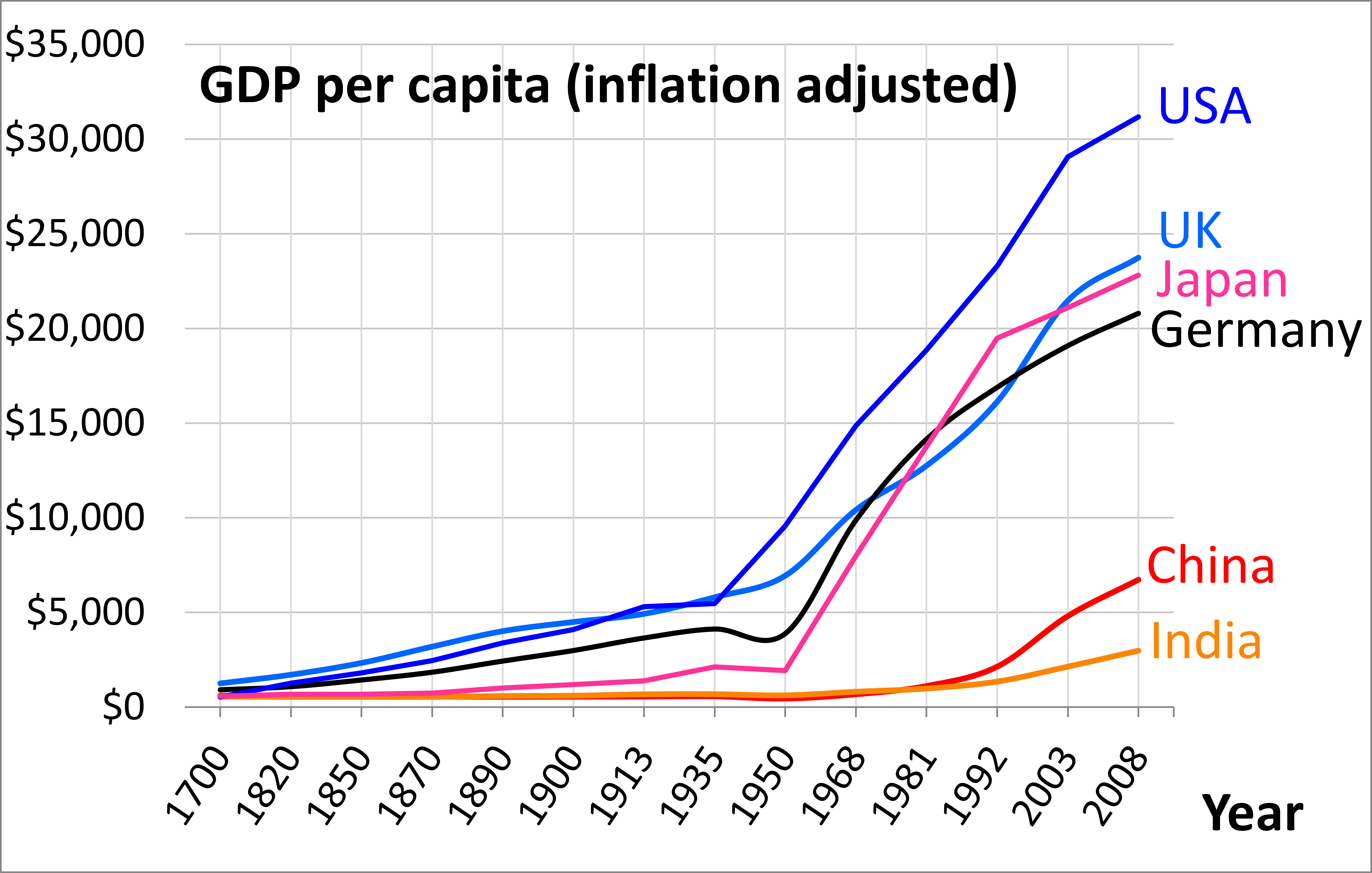
A graph compiled from Angus Maddison's data comparing the GDP per capita of a few major economies since 1700 AD. Since 1700 and after, Western countries were the richest on per capita basis.

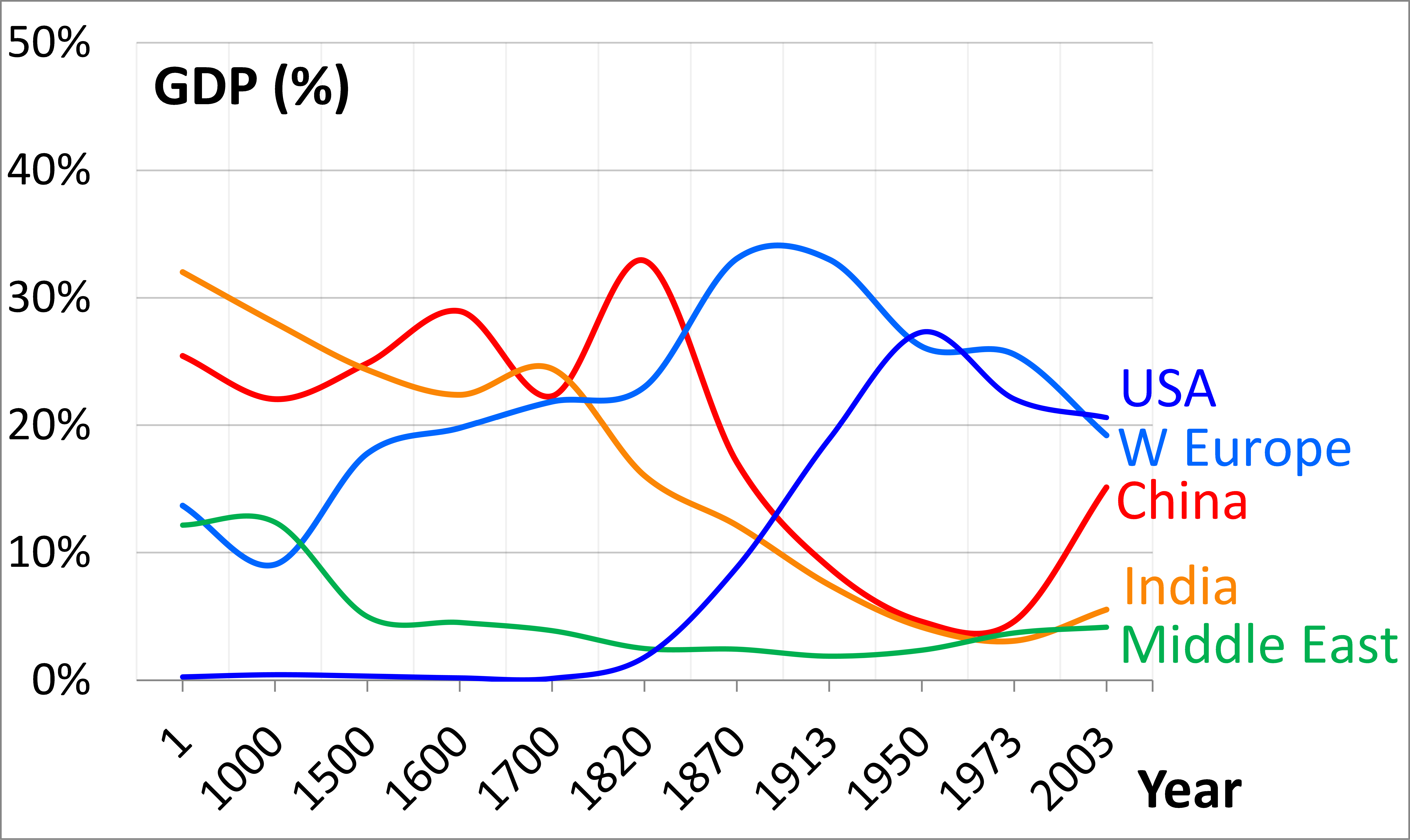
The global contribution to world's GDP by major economies from year 1 to 2003 according to Angus Maddison's estimates. Before the 18th century, India and China were the two largest economies by GDP output.

In 1969–1971, Maddison worked at the Development Advisory Service of the Centre for International Affairs. Maddison also held the position of policy advisor for various institutions, including the governments of Ghana and Pakistan. In addition, he visited many other countries and often directly advised the government leaders of countries such as Brazil, Guinea, Mongolia, the USSR and Japan. This enabled him to gain insight into factors that determine economic growth and prosperity.

In 1978, Maddison was appointed historical Professor at the University of Groningen. Maddison was a pioneer in the field of the construction of national accounts, where a country's accounts are calculated back in periods of several decades all the way to the year 1. To this end he combined modern research techniques with his own extensive knowledge of economic history and in particular countries' performances in the field of GDP per capita. His work resulted in a deep new understanding of the reasons why some countries have become rich whereas others have remained poor (or have succumbed to poverty). In this field, Maddison was regarded as the world's most prominent scholar. Maddison's GDP reconstructions have been criticized.

In the last 20 years of his life, Maddison mainly focussed on the construction of data and analysis further back in time. For example, he published an authoritative study on economic growth in China over the past twenty centuries. This study has strongly boosted the historical debate about the strengths and weaknesses of Europe and China as two of the world's leading economic forces. His estimates regarding the per capita income in the Roman Empire followed up the pioneering work of Keith Hopkins and Raymond W. Goldsmith. He was also author of many works of historical economic analysis, including The World Economy: Historical Statistics and several other reference books on the same topic.

== Awards, death, and legacy ==
At the end of his life, Maddison was living in Chevincourt, near Thourotte (France), but maintained strong connections with the University of Groningen. He was the joint founder and intellectual leader of the Groningen Growth and Development Centre, a research group within the Faculty of Economics in Groningen that focuses on long-term economic growth. The databases maintained by Maddison and his former colleagues, which now include virtually every country in the world, form one of the most important sources for the analysis of long-term economic growth and are used throughout the world by academics and policy analysts.

Maddison received a royal decoration as Commander in the Netherlands Order of Orange Nassau as he turned 80, and in October 2007 received an honorary doctorate at Hitotsubashi University, Japan.

Maddison died on Saturday, 24 April 2010, at the American Hospital of Paris in Neuilly-sur-Seine, France. After his death Maddison's exhaustive work quantifying global economic history was praised as pioneering and important.

== See also ==
- Paul Bairoch
- List of regions by past GDP (PPP) per capita
- List of regions by past GDP (PPP)
- Maddison Project, a project started in March 2010 to continue the work of Maddison on historical economic statistics after his death
