= Rivista di Filologia e di Istruzione Classica =

- Discipline: Classics
- Language: English

Publication details
- History: 1872–present
- Publisher: Brepols (Italy)
- Frequency: quarterly

Standard abbreviations
- ISO 4: Riv. Filol. Istr. Class.

Indexing
- ISSN: 0035-6220

Links
- Journal homepage

Rivista di Filologia e di Istruzione Classica or Riv. Fil. or RFIC is a peer-reviewed Italian academic journal, Published by Brepols. It presents articles and essays on Greek and Roman languages and literatures, history, philosophy, religion, art, and society. Founded in 1872 by Domenico Pezzi and Giuseppe Müller, the journal has published important authors and contributions since its first issue. Gaetano de Sanctis, Augusto Rostagni, Antonio Maddalena, Scevola Mariotti, Leopoldo Gamberale, and Franco Montanari have counted among the most prominent classicists to lead the publication of the RFIC.
