= Maddison Project =

Economic statistics collation (2010–present)

The Maddison Project, also known as the Maddison Historical Statistics Project, is a project to collate historical economic statistics, such as GDP, GDP per capita, and labor productivity.

It was launched in March 2010 to continue the work of the late economic historian Angus Maddison. The project is under the Groningen Growth and Development Centre at the University of Groningen, which also hosts the Penn World Table, another economic statistics project.

== Reception ==
Development economist Branko Milanović (writing for the World Bank), development economist Morten Jerven, and billionaire philanthropist Bill Gates have identified the Maddison Project, the Penn World Tables, and World Bank/IMF data (the World Development Indicators), as the three main sources of worldwide economic statistics such as GDP data, with the focus of the Maddison Project being on historical data. Economist Paul Krugman has suggested the Maddison Project as a data source for historical debt, growth, and labor output and productivity data.

Our World In Data, a website with data-driven discussion of a number of topics related to long-run economic and human development, uses the Maddison Project as one of its data sources.

== See also ==
- Penn World Table
- United Nations World Development Indicators
- The World Economy: Historical Statistics, a 2004 book by Angus Maddison that is an early precursor of the work done by the Maddison Project
- Angus Maddison statistics of the ten largest economies by GDP (PPP)
