= Raymond W. Goldsmith =

American economist

Raymond W. Goldsmith (Dec 23, 1904 – July 12, 1988) was an American economist specialising in historical data on national income, saving, financial intermediation, and financial assets and liabilities.

== Biography ==
Goldsmith was born in Brussels to a family of Jewish ancestry, and grew up in Frankfurt. After finishing secondary school, he worked in a bank for a year that included the German hyperinflation of 1923. He then studied at the Berlin Handelshochschule and obtained a Ph.D. from the University of Berlin in 1928. From then until he left for the US in 1934, he was employed by the German statistical office and the Institut fur Finanzwesen, working on studies of the banking and economic systems of Latin America and elsewhere. He was a fellow at the Brookings Institution, 1930–31, and a postdoc at the London School of Economics, 1933–34.

Between 1934 and 1951, he worked in various capacities at the Securities and Exchange Commission and the War Production Board. At the Department of State, he helped devise the Colm-Dodge-Goldsmith plan for the German currency reform of 1946, and the financial implementation of the 1947 Austrian peace agreement. He was a consultant to many foreign countries including India, Japan, and Brazil.

In 1951, Goldsmith was appointed professor at New York University and a staff member at the National Bureau of Economic Research. In 1953 he was elected as a Fellow of the American Statistical Association. He published his magnum opus, A Study of Saving in the United States, in 1955. This work, partly coauthored with Dorothy Brady and Horst Menderhausen, ran to three volumes totalling more than 2000 pages and included many hundreds of tables of time series data. These data were crucial for early empirical tests of the life cycle and the permanent income theories of consumption, as the official national income accounts for the USA begin only in 1929. From 1962 to 1973, he was professor of economics at Yale University, remaining an active scholar until the end of his life.

Goldsmith is mainly known as the author of about 15 scholarly books, immensely rich in historical economic and financial data about the US, other countries, and the ancient world.

- Financial Intermediaries in the American Economy since 1900.
- 1962. The national Wealth of the U.S. in the Postwar Period.
- 1963 (with Robert E. Lipsey and Morris Mendelson). Studies in the National Balance Sheet of the U.S. In two volumes.
- 1969. Financial Structure and Development.

Goldsmith's books provide a rich stock of American economic data: national income flows before 1929; stocks of tangible assets before 1925; and, financial assets and liabilities before 1945.

His method of estimating Roman GDP from meager ancient evidence provided the basis for subsequent attempts by economic historians including Angus Maddison, Peter Temin and others.

His wife, Selma Fine Goldsmith, was also a noted economic statistician. He died in Hamden, Connecticut in 1988.

== Works ==
- (1958) Financial intermediaries in the American economy since 1900 (Studies in capital formation and financing)
- (1975) "The Quantitative International Comparison of Financial Structure and Development," Journal of Economic History 34(2): 216-237.
- (1984) "An Estimate of the Size and Structure of the National Product of the Early Roman Empire," Review of Income and Wealth 30(3): 263–288.
- (April 1, 1985) Comparative National Balance Sheets: A Study of Twenty Countries, 1688-1978 ISBN 978-0226301532
