= Paul Bairoch =

Belgian economic historian

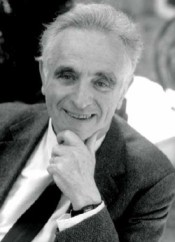
- Born: 24 July 1930; Antwerp, Belgium
- Died: 12 February 1999 (aged 68); Geneva, Switzerland

Academic background
- Education: Ecole Pratique des Hautes Etudes; Free University of Brussels

Academic work
- Discipline: economic history
- Institutions: Free University of Brussels; Sir George Williams University; Ecole Pratique des Hautes Etudes; University of Geneva
- Notable works: Economics and World History: Myths and Paradoxes

Paul Bairoch (24 July 1930 in Antwerp – 12 February 1999 in Geneva) was a (in 1985 naturalised) Swiss economic historian of Belgian descent who specialized in urban history and historical demography. He published or co-authored more than two dozen books and 120 scholarly articles. His most important works emphasize the agricultural preconditions necessary for industrialization and controversially claim, contrary to most scholars that colonization was not beneficial to colonial empires. He argued that tariffs and growth were positively correlated in the 19th century.

== Academic career ==
Bairoch gained a bachelor's degree by correspondence, intending to become an engineer but he turned to studying economic history in 1956 at the parisian Ecole Pratique des Hautes Etudes. He obtained his doctorate in 1963 at the Free University of Brussels where he worked from 1965 to 1995. He was economic adviser to the General Agreement on Tariffs and Trade (GATT) at Geneva from 1967 to 1969, professor at the Sir George Williams University (Concordia) in Montréal from 1969 to 1971 and on recommendation of Fernand Braudel became director of studies at the Ecole Pratique des Hautes Etudes from 1971 to 1972. In 1972 he was made professor of history at the University of Geneva. He retired in 1995. He was also visiting professor at Harvard and at the Collège de France (1983) and Doctor honoris causa at the ETH Zurich. From 1985, Bairoch directed a number of research projects on the world economy at a Centre for International Economic History in Geneva.

== Views ==
Paul Bairoch sought through quantitative, empirical research of historical trends to question and challenge many beliefs which are nowadays generally accepted in economics (see in particular his work Economics and World History: Myths and Paradoxes), among which: the idea that free trade historically led to periods of economic growth; that moving away from free trade caused the Great Depression; and that colonial powers in the 19th and early 20th centuries became rich by exploiting the Third World.

Bairoch argued that such beliefs are based on insufficient knowledge and misguided interpretations of the economic history of the United States, Europe and the Third World. He researched extensively the reasons why an industrial takeoff was prevented in the colonised countries of the Third World (see e.g. his book Révolution industrielle et sous-développement). He is particularly known for his detailed empirical research on economic problems of Third World countries, on the Industrial Revolution and its aftermath and on urban history. His historical estimates of Gross Product measures are still being referred to in the literature, although some are also challenged by other economic historians such as Angus Maddison.

Bairoch argues that free trade contributed to deindustrialization in the Ottoman Empire. In contrast to the protectionism of China, Japan, and Spain, the Ottoman Empire had a liberal trade policy, open to foreign imports. This has origins in capitulations of the Ottoman Empire, dating back to the first commercial treaties signed with France in 1536 and taken further with capitulations in 1673 and 1740, which lowered duties to 3% for imports and exports. The liberal Ottoman policies were praised by British economists such as J. R. McCulloch in his Dictionary of Commerce (1834), but later criticized by British politicians such as Prime Minister Benjamin Disraeli, who cited the Ottoman Empire as "an instance of the injury done by unrestrained competition" in the 1846 Corn Laws debate:

There has been free trade in Turkey, and what has it produced? It has destroyed some of the finest manufactures of the world. As late as 1812 these manufactures existed; but they have been destroyed. That was the consequences of competition in Turkey, and its effects have been as pernicious as the effects of the contrary principle in Spain.

== Criticism ==
In his contribution to the Cambridge Economic History of Europe, Paul Bairoch argued that during the late 19th century, protectionist trade policies were positively associated with economic growth and trade expansion, while liberal trade policies coincided with stagnation. He summarized this position by stating that “protectionism [equaled] economic growth and expansion of trade; liberalism [equaled] stagnation in both.”

This claim has been subject to criticism, particularly by economist Douglas Irwin. While Irwin acknowledged the existence of a correlation between tariffs and growth during this period, he cautioned against interpreting this as evidence of a causal relationship. He pointed out that several countries with high tariffs, such as Argentina and Canada, experienced rapid growth not because of protectionism, but due to capital inflows that fueled export-led growth in agricultural staples. Irwin further noted that many land-abundant, labor-scarce countries imposed high tariffs primarily to generate government revenue, rather than to protect domestic industries. As a result, the association between tariffs and growth may be confounded by structural factors, such as factor endowments and fiscal policy, rather than trade strategy alone.

A study by Antonio Tena-Junguito also revisits and challenges Paul Bairoch’s hypothesis that tariffs were positively associated with economic growth in the late 19th century. Drawing on a new dataset of industrial tariffs for 32 countries in the 1870s, the study finds that the correlation between tariffs and growth is not universal and depends heavily on the structure of protection and regional differences. Contrary to Bairoch’s general claim, the evidence shows that higher protection—measured by total and manufacturing tariff averages—was associated with lower growth at the global level, particularly in poorer countries. These countries typically protected unskilled and inefficient sectors, leading to limited or negative economic outcomes.

== Books and monographs ==
- Le mythe de la croissance économique rapide au XIXe siècle. 1962
- Le processus et l'amorce de la croissance économique. [1963]
- La formation des prix des fruits, légumes et produits laitiers (with Georges Thorn). Bruxelles: Université libre de Bruxelles, Institut de sociologie, 1964
- La baisse des coûts des transports et le développement économique. 1965
- Niveaux de développement économique de 1810 áa 1910. 1965
- L'économie belge et internationale (with T. Deldycke and others). Institut de sociologie, Université libre de Bruxelles, 1965.
- Originalités et conséquences de la révolution industrielle. 1966
- Le rôle de l'agriculture dans la création de la sidérurgie moderne. 1966
- Evolution de la population active dans le monde par branches et par régions, 1880–1960. 1968
- La population active et sa structure. Sous la direction de P. Bairoch par T. Deldycke, H. Gelders [et] J.-M. Limbor avec la participation de G. Lefevere, G. Thorn [et] G. Vandenabeele. [1968]
- Diagnostic de l'évolution économique du Tiers-monde, 1900–1968. 4th edition. Paris: Gauthier-Villars, 1970
- De tertiaire sector; studie over de invloed der ontwikkeling op de vermindering van de omvang der economische fluctuaties (with others) Bruxelles: Institut de sociologie de l'Université libre, [1970]
- Le Tiers monde en l'an 2000 (with Pierre Masse). Paris: Presses universitaires de France, 1971.
- Trend in 1960–1967 and short term prospects of the Third World economy. Dakar: United Nations, African Institute for Economic Development and Planning, 1971.
- Le Tiers-Monde dans l'impasse. Le démarrage économique du XVIIIe au XXe siècle. Gallimard, 1971.
- Le chômage urbain dans les pays en voie de développement: présentation générale du problème et éléments d'une solution. Genève: Bureau International du Travail, 1972.
- Révolution industrielle et sous-développement. Fourth edition, Paris: Mouton, 1974.
- The economic development of the Third World since 1900. 1975
- Urban Unemployment in Developing Countries: The Nature of the Problem and Proposals for Its Solutions International Labour Office; 2nd edition, June 1976
- Commerce extérieur et développement économique de l'Europe au XIX siècle. Paris: Mouton, 1976.
- Taille des villes, conditions de vie et développement économique. Paris: Éd. de l'École des hautes études en sociales, 1977.
- Disparities in Economic Development Since the Industrial Revolution (Paul Bairoch and Maurice Lévy-Leboyer, eds.) Palgrave: Macmillan, 1981. New York: St. Martin’s Press, 1981.
- Structure par produits des exportations du Tiers-monde 1830–1937 (with Bouda Etemad) Genève: Droz, 1985.
- Les passages des économies traditionnelles européennes aux sociétés industrielles: quatrième rencontre franco-suisse d'histoire économique et sociale.(ed. by Paul Bairoch and Anne-Marie Piuz). Genève: Droz, 1985.
- Histoire économique De Jéricho à Mexico. Villes et économie dans l’histoire. Gallimard, 1985
- La population des villes européennes: 800–1850: banque de données et analyse sommaire des résultats (with Jean Batou and Pierre Chèvre) Genève: Droz, 1988.
- Cities and Economic Development: From the Dawn of History to the Present. Translated by Christopher Braider. Chicago: University of Chicago Press, 1988
- La Suisse dans l'économie mondiale (with Martin Körner). Genève: Droz, 1990.
- World energy production, 1800–1985 = Production mondiale d'énergie (with Etemad Bouda & Jean Luciani; under the direction of Paul Bairoch & Jean-Claude Toutain) Genève: Librairie Droz, 1991
- Liber amicorum: Henri Vander Eycken (with Henri Vander Eycken). Brussels: VUBPress, 1991.
- Economics and World History: Myths and Paradoxes. University of Chicago Press, 1993
- Autour de l'histoire sociale du temps. Zurich: Chronos Verlag, 1997.
- Victoires et déboires: histoire économique et sociale du monde du XVIe siècle à nos jours (3 Vols). Gallimard, 1997.
- L'agriculture des pays développés, 1800 à nos jours: production, productivité, rendements. Paris: Economica, c1999

== Selected articles ==
- Paul Bairoch and J.-M. Limbor, "Changes in the Industrial Distribution of the World Labour Force, by Region, 1880–1960," International Labour Review, 98 (1968), pp. 311–336;
- "Population urbaine et taille des villes en Europe de 1600 à 1970," Revue d'histoire économique et sociale, Vol. 54, pp. 304–335
- "Structure de la population active mondiale de 1700 à 1970," Annales E.S.C., 26 (1971), pp. 960–976.
- "Free Trade and European Economic Development in the Nineteenth Century’. IN: European Economic Review, 3, 1972.
- "Agriculture and the industrial revolution 1700–1914", in: Carlo Cipolla (ed.), The Industrial Revolution – Fontana Economic History of Europe, Vol. 3. London: Collins/Fontana, 1973
- "Commerce international et genese de la revolution industrielle anglaise." In: Annales, 28, pp. 541–571, 1973
- "European Foreign Trade in the XIX Century: The Development of the Value and Volume of Exports (Preliminary Results)", in: Journal of European Economic History, Vol. 2, no. 1, 1973
- "Geographical Structure and Trade Balance of European Foreign Trade from 1800 to 1970" in: Journal of European Economic History, Vol. 3, no. 3, 1974
- "European Gross National Product 1800–1975", in: Journal of European Economic History, 5, 1976.
- "Reply to Mr. Gunder Frank's Commentary", in: Journal of European Economic History, Vol. 5, n. 2, 1976
- "Le volume des productions et du produit national dans le Tiers monde, 1900–1977". In: Tiers-monde, 20(80) oct./dec. 1979: 669–691
  - "Nature de la technologie et problematique du demarrage economique". Chronique sociale de France, cahier 6, décembre 1969, 77e année, p. 15–26
- "International industrialization levels from 1750 to 1980", in: Journal of European Economic History, Vol. 11, no's 1 & 2, Fall 1982.
- "Employment and Large Cities: Problems and Outlook". International Labour Review, v121 n5 p519-33 Sep–Oct 1982
- "Libre-echange et protectionnisme, idées reçues et réalités: les enseignements de l'histoire". In: Economie et humanisme, no 277, mai-juin 1984, p. 8–18
- "Les mesures de conversion des énergies primaires. Historique des unités et présentation des coefficients", Histoire & Mesure, Vol. I – N° 3/4, 1986.
- "Factors of urbanisation in the nineteenth century developed countries: a descriptive and econometric analysis" (with Gary Goertz) Urban studies, Vol. 23, no. 4, Aug. 1986.
- "Historical Roots of Economic Underdevelopment: Myths and Realities". in: W. J. Mommsen & J. Osterhammel(ed.). Imperialism and After. Continuities and Discontinuities. Londres: Allen & Unwin, 1986.
- Burke, Susan; Bairoch, Paul (June 1989). "Chapter I - European trade policy, 1815–1914". In Mathias, Peter; Pollard, Sidney (eds.). The Industrial Economies: The Development of Economic and Social Policies. The Cambridge Economic History of Europe from the Decline of the Roman Empire. Vol. 8. New York: Cambridge University Press. pp. 1–160. doi:10.1017/chol9780521225045.002. ISBN 978-0521225045.
- "Urbanization and the Economy in Preindustrial Societies: the Findings of Two Decades of Research", in: Journal of European Economic History vol. 18, no. 2 1989
- "La Littérature periodique d'histoire economique contemporaine" (with Bouda Etemad), in: Annales E.S.C., 47, 1987
- "The Impact of Crop Yields, Agricultural Productivity, and Transport Costs on Urban Growth between 1800 and 1910". In: A M van der Woude, Akira Hayami, Jan De Vries (eds.) Urbanization in history: a process of dynamic interactions. New York: Oxford University Press, 1990.
- "L'industrie manufacturière suisse: succès et déboires: une perspective internationale et historique (1830–1990)". In: Passé pluriel: en hommage au professeur Roland Ruffieux. Fribourg: Ed. universitaires, 1991.
- "The City and Technological Innovation" in Favorites of Fortune; Technology, Growth, and Economic Development since the Industrial Revolution. Edited by Patrice Higonnet, David S. Landes and Henry Rosovsky. Cambridge, Mass.: Harvard University Press, 1991
- "La Belgique dans le commerce international, 1830–1990", in: Paul Klep & Eddy van Cauweberge (eds.), Entrepreneurship and the Transformation of the Economy (10th–20th Centuries). Essays in Honour of Herman van der Wee, Leuven 1994.
- "Globalisation myths: some historical reflections on integration, industrialisation and growth in the world economy" (with Richard Kozul-Wright). UNCTAD discussion paper UNCTAD/OSG/DP/113 March 1996
- "Globalization, myths and realities: One century of external trade and foreign investment", in R. Boyer and D. Drache, (eds), States Against Markets: The Limits of Globalisation. London: Routledge, 1996.
- "Les exportations d’articles manufacturés de la Suisse dans le contexte international (1840–1994)". In: Martin Körner und François Walter (ed.), Quand la Montagneaussi a une Histoire. Festschrift für J.-F. Bergier. Bern: Verlag Paul Haupt: Bern, 1996, pp. 205–234
- "New Estimates of Agricultural Productivity and Yields of Developed Countries, 1800–1990," in Amit Bhaduri and Rune Skarstein, eds., Economic Development and Agricultural Productivity, Cheltenham, U.K., Edward Elgar, 1997, pp. 45–64.
- "The impact of globalization on employment in Europe" in: Trade and jobs in Europe: much ado about nothing?, edited by Mathias Dewatripont, André Sapir, and Khalid Sekkat. Oxford: Oxford University Press, 1999.
- "The Constituent Economic Principles of Globalization in Historical Perspective." International Sociology, Vol. 15, No. 2, pp. 197–214, 2000

== About Paul Bairoch ==
- Towards an international economic and social history: essays in honour of Paul Bairoch. Genève: Ed. Passé Présent, 1995.
- Bouda Etemad and Jean Batou, "Paul Bairoch (1930–1999)" in Revue d'histoire suisse, vol. 49, n° 3, 1999, pp. 391–394.
- Patrick Verley, "In Memoriam: Paul Bairoch (1930–1999)", Revue économique, Vol. 51, No. 2.
- A. M. Piuz, "Paul Bairoch", Journal of European Economic History, vol 29, no. 1, 2000
- Peter Scholliers, "Bairoch, Paul". In: Nouvelle biographie nationale. Bruxelles: Académie Royale des sciences, lettres et des beaux-arts de Belgique, 2012, pp. 11–12.

== See also ==
- Angus Maddison
- James Morris Blaut
- Andre Gunder Frank
