= Walter Scheidel =

Austrian historian (born 1966)

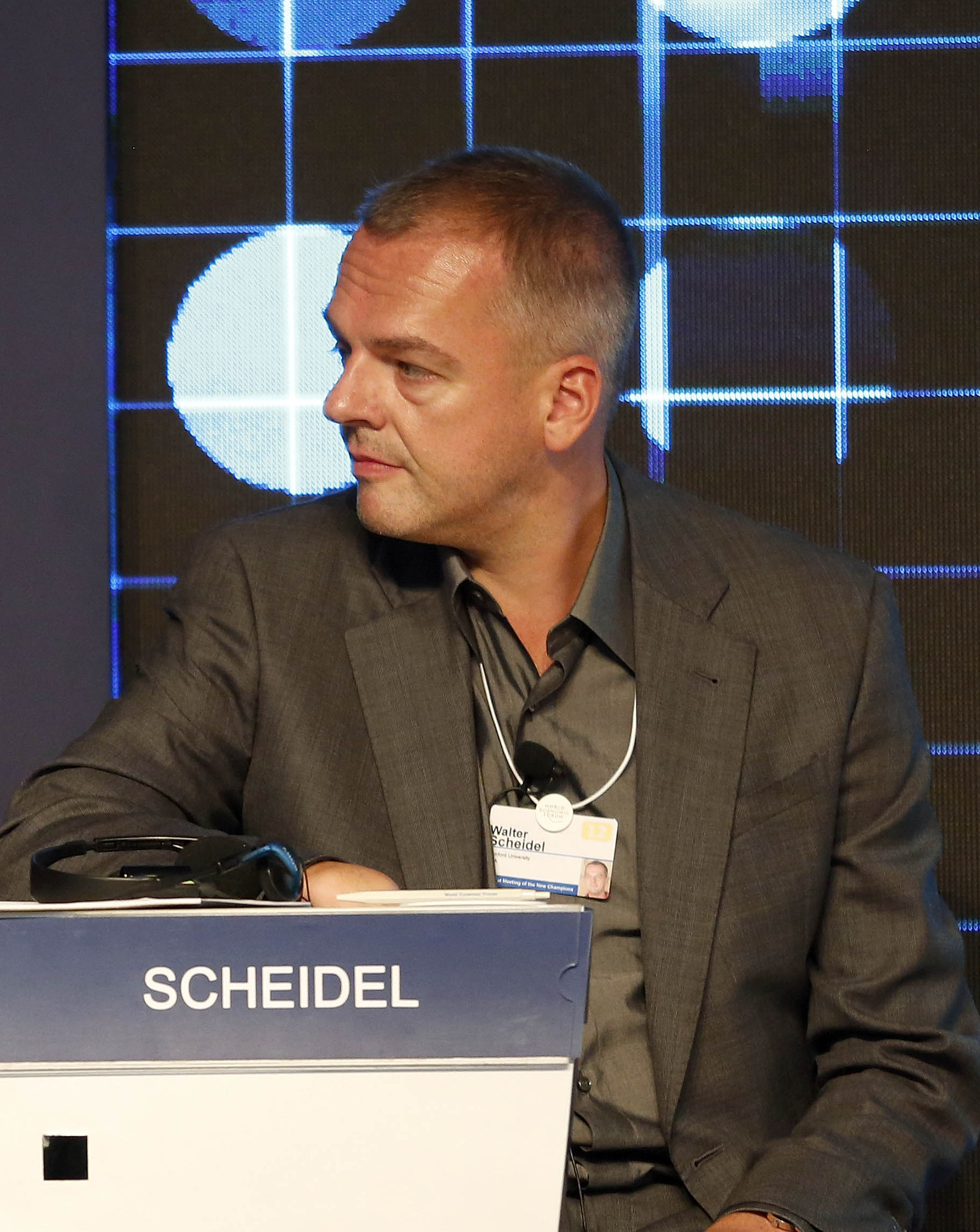
- Scheidel at the World Economic Forum Annual Meeting of the New Champions in 2012
- Born: 9 July 1966 (age 60); Vienna, Austria
- Occupation: Historian

Academic background
- Education: University of Vienna

Academic work
- Institutions: Stanford University

Walter Scheidel (born 9 July 1966) is an Austrian historian who teaches ancient history at Stanford University, California. Scheidel's main research interests are ancient social and economic history, pre-modern historical demography, and comparative and transdisciplinary approaches to world history.

== Biography ==
From 1984 to 1993, Scheidel studied ancient history and numismatics at the University of Vienna, where he obtained his doctorate in 1993. In 1998, he completed his habilitation at the University of Graz. From 1990 to 1994, he worked as an administrative and research assistant at the University of Vienna. As an Erwin Schrödinger Fellow of the Austrian Research Council, he spent 1995 as a visiting scholar at the University of Michigan in Ann Arbor. From 1996 to 1999, he was Moses and Mary Finley Research Fellow in Ancient History at Darwin College, Cambridge. During this period, he also served as visiting professor at the École des Hautes Études en Sciences Sociales in Paris and the University of Innsbruck.

In 1999, Scheidel moved to the United States, where he initially held visiting positions at Stanford University and the University of Chicago. In 2003, he took up his current position in the Department of Classics at Stanford, where he was promoted to professor in 2004 and received an endowed chair, the Dickason Professorship in the Humanities, in 2008. He is also a Kennedy-Grossman Fellow in Stanford's Human Biology program.

Scheidel has published six academic monographs and more than 260 papers and reviews, and has edited or co-edited 16 other books. He is co-editor of a monograph series for Oxford University Press and was co-founder of the Princeton/Stanford Working Papers in Classics, the world's first online repository for working papers in the field. In May 2012, Scheidel and Elijah Meeks launched the interactive website ORBIS: The Stanford Geospatial Network Model of the Roman World. He has been awarded a New Directions Fellowship of the Andrew W. Mellon Foundation and a Guggenheim Fellowship and is a Corresponding Member of the Austrian Academy of Sciences.

== Reception ==
The Great Leveler was shortlisted for the Cundill History Prize 2017 and for the Financial Times and McKinsey Business Book of the Year 2017. One of The Economist's Books of the Year 2017, it was selected by Martin Wolf as his Financial Times Summer Book of 2017. William Easterly wrote in a review of The Great Leveler, which argues that violence is the main contributor to declines in inequality, that "the great virtue of the book is to present a lot of evidence on both sides for the readers to judge the thesis for themselves."

The Financial Times and the Evening Standard named Escape from Rome one of their best books of 2019. In his review, Robert Colvile noted that although “Scheidel has to do an awful lot of heavy lifting” in his book, it “is a measure of Scheidel’s talent and dedication that, by and large, he succeeds.” Escape From Rome was panned by fellow historian Felipe Fernández-Armesto who accuses Scheidel of wholesale oversimplification, "cutting through the chaos of real life and dismissing its messiness." Paolo Tedesco of the University of Tübingen, reviewing the book, described it as "stimulating [and] thought provoking", although he considered that its historical arguments were not convincing.

== Works ==
=== Publications ===
- Grundpacht und Lohnarbeit in der Landwirtschaft des römischen Italien, Frankfurt: Lang, 1994, ISBN 3-631-47904-2
- Measuring Sex, Age and Death in the Roman Empire: Explorations in Ancient Demography, Ann Arbor: Journal of Roman Archaeology, 1996, ISBN 1-887829-21-0
- Debating Roman Demography, Leiden: Brill, 2001 (editor), ISBN 90-04-11525-0
- Death on the Nile: Disease and the Demography of Roman Egypt, Leiden: Brill, 2001, ISBN 90-04-12323-7
- Ostrakismos-Testimonien I: Die Zeugnisse antiker Autoren, der Inschriften und Ostraka über das athenische Scherbengericht aus vorhellenistischer Zeit (487–322 v. Chr.), Stuttgart: Steiner Verlag Stuttgart, 2002 (co-editor), ISBN 3-515-07947-5
- The Ancient Economy, Edinburgh: Edinburgh University Press, and New York: Routledge, 2002 (co-editor), ISBN 0-7486-1322-6
- The Cambridge Economic History of the Greco-Roman World, Cambridge: Cambridge University Press, 2007 (co-editor), ISBN 978-0-521-78053-7
- The Dynamics of Ancient Empires: State Power from Assyria to Byzantium, New York: Oxford University Press, 2009 (co-editor), ISBN 978-0-19-537158-1
- Rome and China: Comparative Perspectives on Ancient World Empires, New York: Oxford University Press, 2009 (editor), ISBN 978-0-19-533690-0
- The Oxford Handbook of Roman Studies, Oxford: Oxford University Press, 2010 (co-editor), ISBN 978-0-19-921152-4
- The Cambridge Companion to the Roman Economy, Cambridge: Cambridge University Press, 2012 (editor), ISBN 978-0-521-89822-5
- The Oxford Handbook of the State in the Ancient Near East and Mediterranean, New York: Oxford University Press, 2013 (co-editor), ISBN 978-0-19-518831-8
- State Power in Ancient China and Rome, New York: Oxford University Press, 2015 (editor), ISBN 978-0-19-020224-8
- Fiscal Regimes and the Political Economy of Premodern States, Cambridge: Cambridge University Press, 2015 (co-editor), ISBN 978-1-107-08920-4
- On Human Bondage: After Slavery and Social Death, Malden: Wiley-Blackwell, 2017 (co-editor), ISBN 978-1-119-16248-3
- The Great Leveler: Violence and the History of Inequality from the Stone Age to the Twenty-First Century, Princeton: Princeton University Press, 2017, ISBN 978-0-691-16502-8
- The Science of Roman History: Biology, Climate, and the Future of the Past, Princeton: Princeton University Press, 2018 (editor), ISBN 978-0-691-16256-0
- Escape from Rome: The Failure of Empire and the Road to Prosperity, Princeton: Princeton University Press, 2019, ISBN 978-0-691-17218-7
- The Oxford World History of Empire, 2 vols., New York: Oxford University Press, 2021 (co-editor), ISBN 978-0-197-53397-0
- What Is Ancient History?, Princeton: Princeton University Press, 2025, ISBN 978-0-691-23665-0

== See also ==
- Roman demography
- Roman economy
