= Paolo Malanima =

Italian economic historian

- Born: 17 December 1950; Calci, Italy
- Education: Scuola Normale Superiore of Pisa
- Scientific career
- Fields: Economic historian
- Workplaces: Institute of Mediterranean Societies, Naples

Paolo Malanima (born 17 December 1950) is an Italian economic historian, Professor Emeritus of Economic History at the Magna Graecia University of Catanzaro, and former director of the Institute of Studies on Mediterranean Societies in Naples. Malanima's main research interests are long-term developments in economic history, particularly the performance of the Italian economy since Classical antiquity, history of energy and global history.

== Life ==
Paolo Malanima received his education in Humanities at the Scuola Normale Superiore in Pisa and the University of Pisa from 1969 to 1973. He was Professor of Economic History and Economics at the University of Pisa from 1977 until 1994, and at the Magna Græcia University in Catanzaro, Calabria, from 1994 until 2021.

In 2002–2013, Malanima was director of the Institute of Studies on Mediterranean Societies (ISSM) in Naples, of the Italian National Council of Research.

Malanima has been president of the European School for Training in Economic and Social Historical Research (ESTER) at the University of Groningen since 2000, member of the executive committee of the programme of Ramses 2 coordinated by the Maison de la Méditerranée in Aix-en-Provence, and member of the scientific committee and council of the "Istituto Internazionale di Storia Economica F. Datini" (both since 2009).

As of 2010, Malanima is on the editorial board of the journals Società e Storia and Rivista di Storia Economica, corresponding editor of the International Review of Social History (since 1993), and a member of the council of Investigaciones de Historia Economica. In the years 2003 to 2009, he was a member of the board of the Italian Society of Historical Demography (SIDES). In 2005-2014, he was the editor of the Rapporto sulle economie del Mediterraneo, an annual periodical published by Il Mulino.

In 2023, Paolo Malanima was awarded the title of Professor Emeritus in Economic History by the Magna Graecia University of Catanzaro, a title conferred by the Ministry of University and Research (MUR) with the Decree 372 07/02/2024.

== Recent works ==
- L'economia italiana. Dalla crescita medievale alla crescita contemporanea, Bologna: Il Mulino, 2002
- Progress, Decline, Growth: Product and Productivity in Italian Agriculture, 1000–2000, Economic History Review, Vol. 57, No. 3, 2004, pp. 437–464 (co-author)
- Cycles and Stability. Italian Population before the Demographic Transition (225 B.C. – A.D. 1900), Rivista di Storia Economica, Vol. 21, No. 3, 2005, pp. 197–232 (co-author), ISSN 0393-3415
- Urbanisation and the Italian Economy During the Last Millennium, European Review of Economic History, Vol. 9, 2005, pp. 97–122
- Energy Consumption in Italy in the 19th and 20th Centuries, Napoli: Issm-Cnr, 2006
- Pre-modern European Economy. One Thousand Years (10th–19th Centuries), Leiden-Boston: Brill 2009
- GDP in Pre-Modern Agrarian Economies (1–1820 AD). A Revision of the Estimates, Rivista di Storia Economica, Vol. 25, No. 3, 2009, pp. 391–419 (co-author)
- 150 Years of the Italian Economy, 1861–2010, Journal of Modern Italian Studies, Vol. 15, 2010, pp. 1–20 (co-author)
- Urbanisation 1700–1870, in Broadberry, S.; O'Rourke, K. (eds.), The Cambridge Economic History of Modern Europe, I, Chap. 10, Cambridge: Cambridge University Press, 2010
- Il divario Nord-Sud in Italia 1861-2011, (with V. Daniele), Rubbettino, Soveria Mannelli, 2011.
- Geography, market potential and industrialization in Italy 1871–2001](with V. Daniele and N. Ostuni, Papers in Regional Science, 97: 639–662.
- The Economy of Renaissance Italy, Routledge, Oxon and New York, 2022.

== See also ==
- Elio Lo Cascio
