= Milton Gilbert =

American economist

Milton Gilbert (1909 – September 28 or 29, 1979) was an economist and finance expert who worked at the United States Department of Commerce, Organisation for European Economic Cooperation (OEEC) and Bank for International Settlements.

== Early life and education ==
Gilbert was born in Philadelphia in 1909. He obtained a Bachelor of Science degree at Temple University and in 1937 received a Ph.D. in economics from the University of Pennsylvania. Gilbert studied under Simon Kuznets and was influenced heavily by Kuznets' approach, though the two would have disagreements in the 1940s.

== Career ==
=== United States Department of Commerce (1941–1950) ===
From 1941 to 1950, Gilbert was chief of the National Income Division of the United States Department of Commerce. While there, he was part of the foundational work done by the United States to develop a system of national income accounting and GDP calculation. In that capacity, he had disagreements with economist Simon Kuznets (the founder of national income accounting in the United States). Gilbert and his colleagues were of the view that these calculations should be done to serve United States government fiscal policy, and that government spending should be included in the GDP calculations. Gilbert's view on the inclusion of government in GDP was heavily influenced by his cousin, the Keynesian economist and Harvard teacher Richard Gilbert, the director of the Defense Economic Section of the Office of Price Administration and Civilian Supply (OPACS), where he saw firsthand the effect of Kuznets' GDP definition: a request for additional government spending by OPACS in 1941 was denied on the grounds that it would not increase national income.

In a meeting in September 1944 between the United States, Canada, and the United Kingdom, a consensus is reached around the approach preferred by Gilbert and other government officials.

While at the U.S. Department of Commerce, Gilbert co-edited a volume of Studies in Income and Wealth (a book series) with Dorothy Brady and Kuznets. The volume was published in 1946.

=== Organisation for European Economic Cooperation (Paris, France) (1951–1960) ===
From 1951 to 1960, Gilbert worked as an economist at the Organisation for European Economic Cooperation (OEEC) in Paris, which would be renamed in 1961 to OECD (its present name). The OEEC had, since the start of the Marshall Plan in 1946, been tasked with monitoring spending and economic growth in Europe. While there, he collaborated with Irving B. Kravis on An International Comparison of National Products and the Purchasing Power of Currencies (1954), a pioneering work on international comparison of production and purchasing power. Gilbert co-authored further work along the same lines published in 1958. This work was an early precursor to the International Comparison Program that would be created in 1968 at the University of Pennsylvania which in turn would lead to Real GDP Per Capita for More Than One Hundred Countries by Kravis, Alan W. Heston and Robert Summers in 1978, the first version of the Penn World Table.

=== Bank for International Settlements (Basel, Switzerland) (1960–1975) ===
Gilbert served as Economic Adviser for the Bank for International Settlements (BIS) in Basel, Switzerland from November 1, 1960, to December 31, 1975. He then retired.

While at BIS, Gilbert became a recognized authority of gold, and wrote The Gold Dollar System—Conditions of Equilibrium and the Price of Gold (Essays in International Finance, No. 70), which was published by Princeton University Press in October 1968. The book is available as a PDF from the website of Princeton University's International Economics Section.

== Recognition ==
Gilbert was named a Fellow of the American Statistical Association in 1947.

== Personal life ==
Gilbert lived in Basel, Switzerland, after his retirement in 1975. He was planning his move back to the United States. While making arrangements, he died of a heart attack at George Washington University Hospital in Washington, D.C., on September 28 or 29, 1979.

Gilbert was survived by his wife Ruth, who was from Basel, three children, Arnold and Sheryl of Washington and Carla of San Diego, California, a brother Mort of San Diego, California, and one grandchild.

== See also ==
- Irving Kravis
- Simon Kuznets
- Richard Stone
