= Béla Balassa =

Hungarian economist (1928–1991)

- Born: 6 April 1928; Budapest, Hungary
- Died: 10 May 1991 (aged 63); Washington, D.C., U.S.
- Education: Yale University; University of Budapest
- Known for: Balassa–Samuelson effect
- Scientific career
- Fields: Economics
- Workplaces: Johns Hopkins University
- Thesis: Planning in Theory and Practice: The Hungarian Experience (1959)
- Academic advisors: William Fellner; Lloyd Reynolds; Robert Triffin

Béla Alexander Balassa (6 April 1928 – 10 May 1991) was a Hungarian economist who served as a professor at Johns Hopkins University, and was a consultant to the World Bank.

Balassa is best known for his work on the relationship between purchasing power parity and cross-country productivity differences (the Balassa–Samuelson effect). He is also known for his work on revealed comparative advantage.

Balassa received a law degree from the University of Budapest. He left Hungary after the Hungarian Revolution of 1956 and went to Austria. While there, he received a grant from the Rockefeller Foundation to study at Yale University, where he received M.A. and Ph.D. degrees in economics in 1958 and 1959, respectively. He won the John Addison Porter Prize for 1959. Balassa also did extensive consulting work for the World Bank, serving as an advisor on development and trade policy. According to an authoritative history of the Bank, Balassa was "a protagonist of the Bank's conceptual transformation in the trade-policy area during the 1970s."

Beyond economics, Balassa was a noted gourmet who compiled and periodically updated an unofficial guide to eating well in Paris while remaining within an international agency expense allowance, which circulated among his friends and colleagues.

== Publications ==
- The Theory of Economic Integration. George Allen & Unwin Ltd. London : 1961.
- Trade prospects for developing countries, Homewood, Ill. : 1964.
- Trade Liberalization Among Industrial Countries : Objectives and Alternatives. Published for the Council on Foreign Relations by McGraw-Hill. New York : 1967.
- The Role of Foreign Trade in the Economic Development of Korea, in Foreign Trade and Investment, University of Wisconsin Press.
- The Newly Industrializing Countries in the World Economy, Pergamon Press: New York.
- Policy Responses to External Shocks in Hungary and Yugoslavia: 1974-76 and 1979-81, Volume 1, Economic Performance and Policy, Printed for the Joint Economic Committee, Congress of the United States, October 28, 1985.
- Policy Experiments in Chile, 1973-1983, in The National Economic Policies of Chile, Edward Altman and Ingo Walter, Eds, New York University.
- The "New Growth Path" in Hungary, in Banca Nazionale del Lavoro Quarterly Review, December 1985.

== Biography ==
- 1962–1967 teaching assistant at Yale University
- 1966–1991 Professor at Johns Hopkins University
- 1966– Advisor, the World Bank
- 1970–1971 editor of REStat; chairman of the Association of Comparative Economics
- 1979–1980 chairman of the Association of Comparative Economic Studies
- 1980 Institut de France, Laureate
