= Total Economy Database =

Database of economic data

The Total Economy Database describes itself as "a comprehensive database with annual data covering GDP, population, employment, hours, labor quality, capital services, labor productivity, and Total Factor Productivity for 123 countries in the world".

== History ==
The Total Economy Database was developed at the Groningen Growth and Development Centre (GGDC) in the University of Groningen in the Netherlands in the early 1990s. Starting in the late 1990s, it began to be produced jointly by GGDC and The Conference Board, a nonprofit founded in 1916 that works on the relationship between business and labor in 60 countries. In 2007, the database was transferred over to The Conference Board, and remains with The Conference Board as of 2017.

== Data and refresh frequency ==
The database used to be refreshed annually, in January to include data till the most recent completed year. However, starting 2015, the database has been updated twice a year, once in May and once later in the year (September or November). The database usually includes:

- Output, labor, and productivity from 1950 to the present or most recently completed year
- Regional aggregates from 1990 to the most recently completed year
- Growth accounting and total factor productivity from 1990 or 1995 to the most recently completed year

== Reception ==
Economist and New York Times columnist Paul Krugman has called the Total Economy Database "the easy source for 1950 onwards" for obtaining GDP data and has cited it in blog posts and articles about economic performance, employment, and number of work hours versus leisure hours.

Financial Times columnist Martin Wolf called the Total Economy Database invaluable while using it to make a point about the effects of Brexit.

Our World In Data, a website with data-driven discussion of a number of topics related to long-run economic and human development, uses the Total Economy Database as one of its sources.

McKinsey & Company has cited the Total Economy Database in its report on Mexico's "two-speed" development.

The Total Economy Database is included in a University of California, Berkeley library guide as a source of macroeconomic data.

== See also ==
The following economic data projects are maintained by the Groningen Growth and Development Centre, which was also the original creator of the Total Economy Database:

- Maddison Project
- Penn World Table

Some other datasets that cover similar data:

- World Development Indicators
