= Kravis =

Kravis is a surname. Notable people with the surname include:

- Henry Kravis (born 1944), American businessman
- Irving Kravis (1917–1992), American economist
- Janis Kravis (1935–2020), Latvian architect
- Marie-Josée Kravis (born 1949), Canadian businessperson
