= List of countries by price level =

The list of countries by price level shows countries by their price level index. The data has been collected by the World Bank's International Comparison Program since the 1970s and has been available for almost all World Bank member states and some other territories since 1990.

The Global price level, as reported by the World Bank, is a way to compare the cost of living between different countries. It's measured using Purchasing Power Parities (PPPs), which help us understand how much money is needed to buy the same things in different places. Price level indexes (PLIs), with the world average set at 100, are calculated by dividing the purchasing power parities (PPPs), where 1 PPP equals 1 US dollar in the US, by the market exchange rates, also equated to 1 US dollar.

These ratios are then adjusted to align with the global average, which is standardized at 100. When the PLI exceeds 100, it signifies that the prices in that economy are above the global average. Conversely, a PLI below 100 suggests that the prices are below the world average.

== List ==
List of countries by global price level as % of world average (2021)
Country / territory	Price level
Bermuda	193.5
Barbados	188.9
Cayman Islands	184.7
Switzerland	181.4
Israel	179.1
Iceland	177.1
Turks and Caicos Islands	172.8
Australia	168.6
Norway	165.3
New Zealand	163.2
Faroe Islands	160.7
United States	158.5
Denmark	157.0
Bahamas	154.9
Luxembourg	153.6
Sweden	153.5
Canada	149.1
Finland	146.7
US Virgin Islands	143.8
Japan	142.5
Ireland	141.6
United Kingdom	140.5
Netherlands	137.5
Austria	133.7
Greenland	132.9
San Marino	132.6
Belgium	132.3
Germany	131.6
France	128.5
Puerto Rico	127.5
Anguilla	123.0
Aruba	120.6
Hong Kong	119.7
Italy	115.7
South Korea	114.6
Curacao	113.9
Andorra	113.3
Spain	110.7
Saint Kitts and Nevis	108.2
Cyprus	107.0
Kuwait	106.3
Antigua and Barbuda	106.1
Malta	103.5
Palestine	102.9
Uruguay	102.3
United Arab Emirates	101.9
Grenada	100.8
Portugal	100.8
Slovenia	99.9
China	97.9
Greece	97.5
Qatar	97.0
Macao	96.9
Singapore	95.6
Trinidad and Tobago	92.1
Slovakia	91.3
Latvia	90.2
Chile	88.3
Czech Republic	87.8
Saint Lucia	86.8
Zimbabwe	85.8
Maldives	84.6
Saint Vincent and the Grenadines	84.5
Haiti	84.4
Costa Rica	84.3
Dominica	84.0
Jamaica	83.9
Belize	83.9
Albania	82.1
Cape Verde	81.9
Lithuania	81.4
Taiwan	81.4
Saudi Arabia	80.7
Djibouti	80.4
Panama	79.4
Oman	79.3
Seychelles	79.2
South Africa	79.1
Bahrain	78.3
Mexico	77.7
Hungary	76.9
Croatia	76.4
Comoros	72.9
Jordan	72.4
Namibia	72.0
Ecuador	71.1
Peru	70.8
Poland	70.7
Gabon	70.0
Brazil	69.8
Fiji	69.6
Honduras	69.6
Morocco	69.6
Central African Republic	69.1
Liberia	69.1
Botswana	68.9
Guyana	68.3
El Salvador	68.1
Turkmenistan	68.0
Democratic Republic of the Congo	67.3
Lesotho	66.4
Bulgaria	65.8
São Tomé and Príncipe	65.8
Guatemala	65.7
South Sudan	65.6
Equatorial Guinea	65.4
Serbia	64.8
Ivory Coast	64.4
Republic of the Congo	63.7
Argentina	63.2
Eswatini	63.2
Mauritius	63.2
Brunei	62.8
Somalia	62.5
Romania	62.4
Bosnia and Herzegovina	62.3
Philippines	62.3
Timor-Leste	62.3
Paraguay	62.2
Libya	61.9
Chad	61.6
Dominican Republic	61.3
Kenya	61.2
Montenegro	61.2
Niger	60.8
Senegal	60.7
Benin	60.3
Iraq	59.7
Ghana	58.6
Malawi	58.4
Guinea-Bissau	58.2
Mali	58.2
Lebanon	58.0
Nigeria	58.0
Malaysia	57.9
Togo	57.8
Burkina Faso	57.1
Bolivia	56.4
Colombia	55.7
Mozambique	55.4
Cameroon	55.3
Cambodia	55.2
Thailand	55.2
North Macedonia	54.0
Moldova	53.3
Indonesia	53.3
Uganda	53.1
Mauritania	52.9
Bangladesh	52.7
Tanzania	52.6
Sierra Leone	52.3
Eritrea	51.9
Russia	51.0
Zambia	51.0
Guinea	50.6
Tunisia	49.7
Laos	49.5
Burundi	48.9
Vietnam	48.7
Madagascar	48.6
Turkey	48.6
Mongolia	48.4
Rwanda	48.1
Kazakhstan	48.0
Nicaragua	47.5
Armenia	46.6
Algeria	45.5
Gambia	45.4
Ethiopia	44.8
India	44.4
Sri Lanka	44.2
Angola	43.7
Nepal	43.6
Belarus	43.0
Iran	43.0
Azerbaijan	42.6
Georgia	42.5
Ukraine	42.4
Pakistan	42.3
Bhutan	42.0
Suriname	41.5
Egypt	39.0
Uzbekistan	38.7
Myanmar	38.0
Kyrgyzstan	37.3
Sudan	36.6
Tajikistan	35.6
Syria	30.7
Afghanistan	26.4

== See also ==
- Big Mac Index
- International dollar
- Purchasing power parity
