= Broadspeed GT 2+2 =

1965 Broadspeed GT 2+2
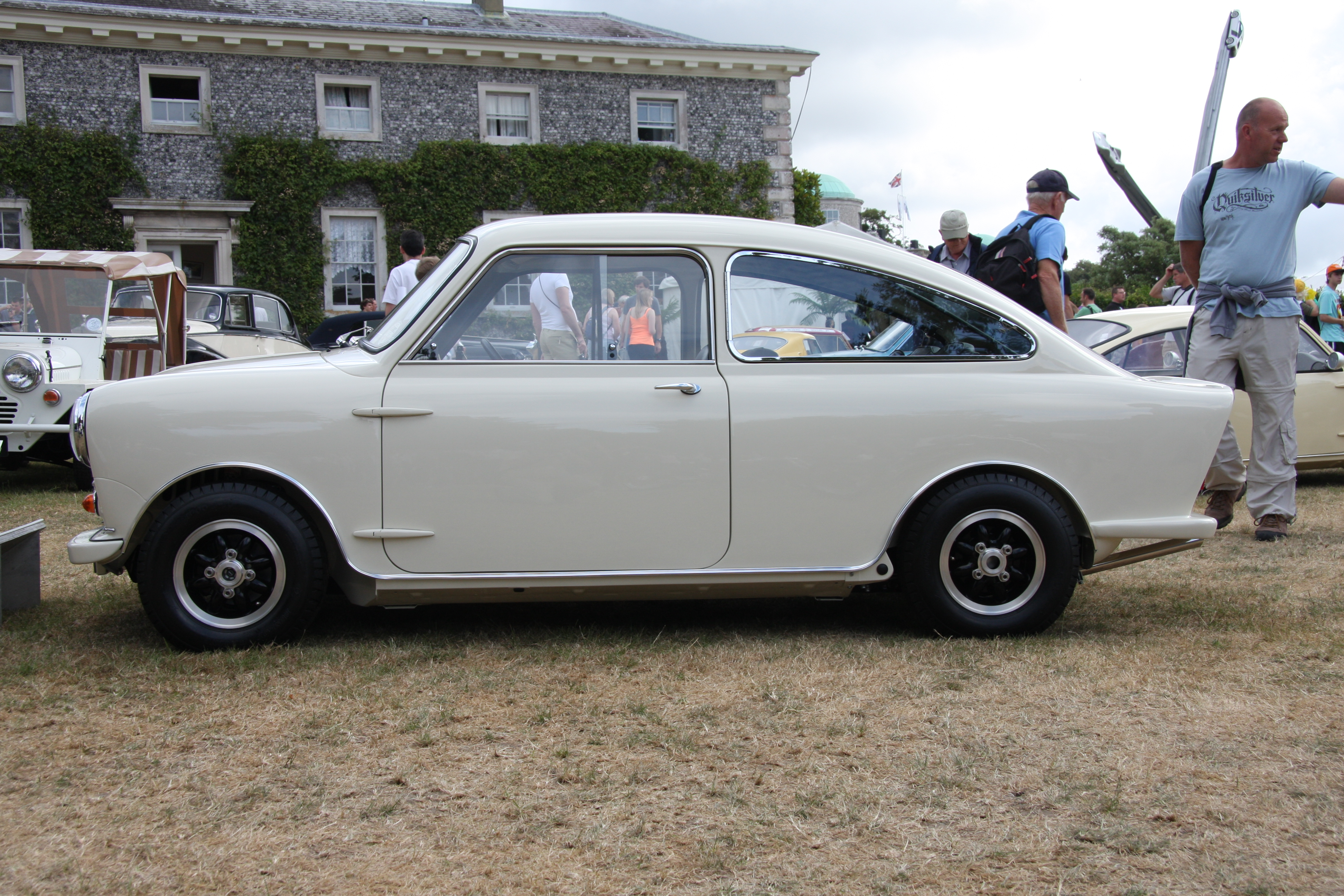

Overview
- Production: 1966–68
- Designer: Tony Bloor

The Broadspeed GT 2+2 is a Mini-based fastback-styled motor vehicle designed by Tony Bloor, Broadspeed's sales manager. It was introduced into the UK market in 1966 and continued in production until 1968, when Broadspeed's factory in Birmingham was scheduled for demolition to make way for a new ring road. By then 28 cars had been built, 16 of them reportedly exported to Spain.

Broadspeed had become well known in the early 1960s for its successful BMC Mini racing team, and for producing a variety of road and race-tuning packages for BMC engines. The GT was the company's first and only foray into car manufacturing.

== Construction ==
Cars and Car Conversions magazine characterised the car as "more the ultimate in conversion than a complete new car" after their test drive. The conversion was achieved by cutting off the rear section of a standard Mini and reducing the door pillars in height by about 2 inches (5.1 cm). Then a fibreglass fastback was bonded to the car in place of the missing rear section, adding about 4 inches (10 cm) to its overall length, and the engine tuned.

The interior was upgraded by the installation of a replacement fascia with additional auxiliary gauges and Restall bucket seats in the front. The new rear seat was designed to fold down to allow access to the boot, as there was no boot lid in the new rear end. The boot was significantly smaller than that of the standard Mini owing to the presence of two fuel tanks, giving the car a range of 300 miles (480 km).

Autocar magazine described the end product of the conversion as "masquerading as a sort of scaled down DB6 Aston Martin".

== Engine and performance ==
The Broadspeed GT was offered in four versions, with the lightweight GTS being top of the range. There was a choice of three engines: 848 cc (51.7 cu in), 998 cc (60.9 cu in) Mini Cooper engine and 1275 cc (77.8 cu in) Mini Cooper S engine. Prices ranged from £799 for the basic 848 cc engined car to £1,500 for the 1275 cc version, equivalent to £35,300 in 2023. (Note: UK Retail Price Index inflation figures are based on data from Clark, Gregory (2017). "The Annual RPI and Average Earnings for Britain, 1209 to Present (New Series)". MeasuringWorth.)

A road test of the 1275 cc Broadspeed GT published in Motorsport magazine in 1966 reported a top speed of 112 mph (180 km/h) and a fuel consumption of 27.9 mpg_{‑imp} (10.1 L/100 km; 23.2 mpg_{‑US}).
