= Measuring economic worth over time =

The measurement of economic worth over time is the problem of relating past prices, costs, values and proportions of social production to current ones. For a number of reasons, relating any past indicator to a current indicator of worth is theoretically and practically difficult for economists, historians, and political economists. This has led to some questioning of the idea of time series of worth having any meaning. However, the popular demand for measurements of social worth over time have caused the production of a number of series.

== The need to measure worth over time ==
People often seek a comparison between the price of an item in the past, and the price of an item today. Over short periods of time, like months, inflation may measure the role an object and its cost played in an economy: the price of fuel may rise or fall over a month. The price of money itself changes over time, as does the availability of goods and services as they move into or out of production. What people choose to consume changes over time. Finally, concepts such as cash money economies may not exist in past periods, nor ideas like wage labour or capital investment. Comparing what someone paid for a good, how much they had to work for that money, what the money was worth, how scarce a particular good was, what role it played in someone's standard of living, what its proportion was as part of social income, and what proportion it was as part of possible social production is a difficult task. This task is made more difficult by conflicting theoretical concepts of worth.

== Theoretical problems ==
One chief problem is the competition between different fundamental conceptions of the division of social product into measurable or theorisable concepts. Marxist and political economic value, neoclassical marginalist, and other ideas regarding proportion of social product not measured in money terms have arisen.

== Practical problems ==
Official measures by governments have a limited depth of the time series, mainly originating in the 20th century. Even within these series, changes in parameters such as consumption bundles, or measures of GDP fundamentally affect the worth of a series.

Historical series computed from statistical data sets, or estimated from archival records have a number of other problems, including changing consumption bundles, consumption bundles not representing standard measures, and changes to the structure of social worth itself such as the move to wage labour and market economies.

== Different series and their use ==
A different time series should be used depending on what kind of economic object is being compared over time:

Consumer Price Indexes and Wage-Price series
Used to compare the price of a basket of standard consumer goods for an "average" individual (often defined as non-agricultural workers, based on survey data), or to assess the ability of individuals to acquire these baskets. For example, used to answer the question, "Has the money price of goods purchased by a typical household risen over time?" or used to make adjustments in international comparisons of standards of living.

Share of GDP
Used to measure income distribution in society or social power of individuals, and the equivalent power of capital. For example, can be used to ask "Has the share of annual production that has gone to workers in the form of income decreased or increased over time?" or "Over the long run do the shares of labor's and capital's income constant over time or do they exhibit trends?"

GDP per capita
Used to compare wage or income relativities over time, for example, used to answer the question, "If in 1870 a grocer earned $40 a week in profit, what would that profit be worth today in terms of social status and economic impact?"

== Wage price series ==
A wage price series is a set of data intended to indicate the real wages and real prices of goods over a span of time, and their relationship to each other through the price of money at the time they were compared. Wage price series are currently collected and computed by major governments. Wage price series are also computed historically by economic historians and non-government organisations. Both contemporary and historical wage price series are inherently controversial, as they speak to the standard of living of working-class people.

== Contemporary wage price series ==
Contemporary wage price series are the result of the normal operation of government economic statistics units, and are often produced as part of the National income accounts.

== Historical wage price series ==
Computing a historical wage price series requires discovering government or non government data, determining if the measures of wage or price are appropriate, and then manipulating the data. Some of these series have been criticised for failing to deal with a number of significant data and theoretical problems.

=== Historical wage price series of the United Kingdom ===
Due to the survival of literary records of economic life from the 13th century in the South of England, extensive attempts have been made to produce long run wage price series regarding Southern England, England in General, or the United Kingdom in the British Isles. Officer's production of a series from 1264 is reliant on a number of assumptions which he readily admits produce questions about his series' representation of reality. Officer is reliant on subseries compiled using different criteria, and these series are reliant upon primary sources that describe different earnings and expenses bundles. The assumption of universal wage labour and a retail goods market, the assumption of money rents, the inability to compute non-market earnings such as obligatory benefits received from masters or the right to squat, all impact on the quality and representative nature of Officer's sources and series.

== See also ==
- Maddison Project
- MeasuringWorth
- Penn World Table
- World Development Indicators
