= R-word =

R-word may refer to:

- R-word index, short for recession index
- R-word, a euphemism for Retard (pejorative), a pejorative term for mentally disabled people
- R-word, another euphemism for Redskin, a pejorative term describing Native Americans in the United States and Indigenous people in Canada
- R-word, a euphemism for rape, used to discuss the topic without explicitly saying the word, in the case of public settings and internet self-censorship (algospeak)
