= Penn effect =

Observed phenomenon in economics

The Penn effect is the economic finding that commodity prices are higher in countries with higher income.

This is often interpreted to mean that real income ratios between high and low income countries are misrepresented by gross domestic product (GDP) conversion at market exchange rates. It is associated with what became the Penn World Table, and it has been a consistent econometric result since at least the 1950s.

However, the "Penn effect", even as Samuelson used it, refers to the general observation: there is correlation between higher price levels and higher per capita income.

The Balassa–Samuelson effect model arises from a project to confirm the result and explicate the cause within the neoclassical framework.

== History ==
Classical economics made simple predictions about exchange rates; it was said that a basket of goods would cost roughly the same amount everywhere in the world, when paid for in some common currency (like gold)^{1}. This is called the purchasing power parity (PPP) hypothesis, also expressed as saying that the real exchange rate (RER) between goods in various countries should be close to one. Fluctuations over time were expected by this theory but were predicted to be small and non-systematic.

Pre-1940, the PPP hypothesis found econometric support, but some time after the Second World War, a series of studies by a University of Pennsylvania team documented a modern relationship: countries with higher incomes consistently had higher prices of domestically produced goods (as measured by comparable price indices), when compared at market exchange rates.

In 1964 the modern theoretical interpretation was set down as the Balassa–Samuelson effect, with studies since then consistently confirming the original Penn effect. However, subsequent analysis has provided many other mechanisms through which the Penn effect can arise, and historical cases where it is expected, but not found. Up until 1994 the PPP-deviation tended to be known as the "Balassa-Samuelson effect", but in his review of progress "Facets of Balassa-Samuelson Thirty Years Later" Paul Samuelson acknowledged the debt that his theory owed to the Penn World Tables data-gatherers, by coining the term "Penn effect" to describe the "basic fact" they uncovered, when he wrote:

The Penn effect is an important phenomenon of actual history, but not an inevitable fact of life.

== Understanding the Penn effect ==
Most things are cheaper in poor (low income) countries than in rich ones. Someone from a "first world" country on vacation in a "third world" country will usually find their money going a lot further abroad than at home. For instance, a Big Mac cost $7.84 in Norway and $2.39 in Egypt in January 2013, at the prevailing USD exchange rate for those two local currencies, despite the fact the two products are essentially the same.

=== The effect's challenge to simple open economy models ===
The (naïve form of the) purchasing power parity hypothesis argues that the Balassa–Samuelson effect should not occur. A simple open economy model treating Big Macs as commodity goods implies that international price competition will force Norwegian, Egyptian, and U.S. burger prices to converge in price. The Penn effect, however, maintains that the general price level will remain consistently higher where (dollar) incomes are high.

=== How identical products can be sold at consistently different prices in different places ===
The law of one price says that the same item cannot sustain two different sale prices in the same market (since everyone would buy only at the lower price). By reversing this law, we can infer that different countries do not share an efficient common market from the fact that prices for the same good are different.

If a McDonald's patron in Oslo were able to eat in an identical Cairo restaurant at one quarter the price they would do so, and price competition would then equalize the Big Mac price throughout the world. Of course, someone can only eat out locally, so regional price differentials can persist; the Oslo and Cairo branches are not in competition. If the Cairo McDonald's starts giving away burgers the price in Oslo will be unaffected, since one is unlikely to dine in Cairo if starting the evening in Oslo, nor can one import an Egyptian meal into Norway by ordering take-out.

=== The price level ===
Measuring 'the' price level involves looking at goods other than burgers, but most goods in a consumer price index (CPI) show the same pattern; equivalent things tend to cost more in high income countries. Most services, perishable goods like the Big Mac, and housing cannot be purchased very far from the point of consumption (where the consumer happens to live). These items form the typical consumer shopping list, and therefore the consumer price level can vary from country to country, just like the burger price.

== The international development implications ==
The deviation in purchasing power parity allows rural Indians to survive on an income below the absolute subsistence level in the rich world. If the money income levels are taken as given, then all else being equal, the Penn effect is beneficial. If it did not apply, millions of the world's poorest people would find that their income was below the survival threshold. However, the effect implies that the money income level disparity as measured by international exchange rates is an illusion, because these exchange rates only apply to traded goods, a small proportion of consumption.

If the genuine income differential (taking local prices into account) is exaggerated by the market exchange rate, so the real difference in the standard of living between rich and poor countries is less than GDP per capita figures would suggest, if converted at market exchange rates. To make a more significant comparison, economists divide a country's average income by its consumer price index.

== See also ==
- The Economist's Big Mac Index consistently shows fourfold differentials in the burger's price.
- Purchasing Power Parity is the situation in which RERs are 1, a nil Penn effect.

== Footnotes ==
^{1} For instance, economists in 1949 expected that one could buy similar quantities of meat in New York for one dollar as in Tokyo for 360 Yen, the pegged nominal exchange rate at the time. It was thought that deviations from this would mostly be caused by problems of supply, and the fact that exchange rates were not allowed to float to market levels by most of the world's central banks (before the 1970s and the end of the Bretton Woods era of gold convertibility).
