= Smallable =

French fashion and interior design company

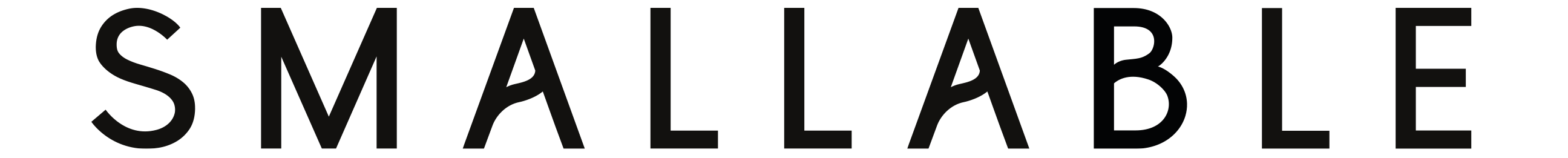
- Industry: E-commerce
- Founded: 2008
- Founder: Cécile Roederer and Pierre Rochand
- Headquarters: Paris, France
- Products: Fashion, furniture, deco, toys, beauty
- Revenue: 75 million euro (2023)
- Number of employees: 90 (2023)
- Website: smallable.com

Smallable is a French company that specialises in the sale of fashion and home décor products for families. The company primarily operates via its e-commerce website. The site features approximately 900 designers.

== History ==
Smallable was founded in Paris in 2008 by Cécile Roederer and Pierre Rochand as an online concept-store dedicated to products for children. The website also offers an online magazine and publishes a birth guide each year. The company targets "digital mums" who have strong purchasing power, with an average order value of nearly 150 euros. The company's activity is tied into a societal trend where adult and children's styles are blurred and where the Consumers themselves share their family experiences.

In 2010, 2 million euros in funding was raised with Alven Capital, primarily to expand into the international market.

In 2013, the brand widened their fashion and décor offering to include products for teenagers.

In 2015, their first boutique opened in Paris. The same year, a second fundraising of 5 million euros was announced.

In 2016, the company began including women's fashion and design into their catalogue, while also launching their own in-house brands.

In 2018, 90% of their turnover was made online, "of which nearly two thirds were generated outside of France"
