= Exchange-rate pass-through =

Exchange-rate pass-through (ERPT) is a measure of how responsive international prices are to changes in exchange rates.

Formally, exchange-rate pass-through is the elasticity of local-currency import prices with respect to the local-currency price of foreign currency. It is often measured as the percentage change, in the local currency, of import prices resulting from a one percent change in the exchange rate between the exporting and importing countries. A change in import prices affects retail and consumer prices. When exchange-rate pass-through is greater, there is more transmission of inflation between countries. Exchange-rate pass-through is also related to the law of one price and purchasing power parity. Subsequent theoretical work has shown that the degree of pass-through also depends on the structure of vertically related markets, with the effect of an exchange-rate shock decomposing into a direct component and an indirect component working through imported-input costs; pass-through tends to be higher under vertical integration than under vertical separation.

== Example ==
Suppose that the US imports widgets from the UK. The widgets cost $10 and £1 costs $1. Then the British Pound appreciates against the dollar and now £1 costs $1.50. Also suppose that the widgets now cost $12.5

There has been a 50% change in the exchange rate and a 25% change in price. The exchange rate pass-through is

$$\frac{25\%}{50\%}=.5.$$

For every 1% increase in the exchange rate, there has been a .5% increase in the price of the widgets.

== Measurement ==
The "standard pass-through regression" is

$$\Delta \ln p_{t} = \alpha+\sum_{i=0}^N\gamma_i \Delta \ln e_{t-i}+\delta \Delta \ln c_t+ \psi\Delta \ln d_t +\epsilon_t,$$

where $p$ is import price, $e$ is the exchange rate, $c$ is marginal costs, $d$ is demand, and $\Delta$ denotes a first difference. The exchange-rate pass-through after $N$ periods is

$$\sum_{i=0}^N\gamma_i.$$

Campa and Goldberg (2005) estimated the long-run exchange-rate pass-through to import prices for the following countries, averaging across the countries from which imports came:

Country	Long-Run Exchange-Rate Pass-Through
Australia	0.69
Canada	0.68
Switzerland	0.94
Czech Republic	0.61
Germany	0.79
Denmark	0.68
Spain	0.56
Finland	0.82
France	1.21
United Kingdom	0.47
Hungary	0.85
Ireland	1.37
Iceland	0.76
Italy	0.62
Japan	1.26
Netherlands	0.77
Norway	0.79
New Zealand	0.62
Poland	0.99
Portugal	0.88
Sweden	0.59
USA	0.41

Measurement of exchange-rate pass-through is typically performed using aggregate price indexes. Some studies have examined how firms in different industries or with different production costs differ in their responses to exchange rates. Studies of firm-level differences explain why exchange-rate pass-through is not equal to one and how globalization caused a decrease in exchange-rate pass-through.
