= GEKS =

Price comparison method

The GauEKS (Gini-Éltető-Köves-Szulc) method is an approach for comparing prices across countries. It is used by the International Comparison Program (ICP) at the World Bank for calculating global relative prices, or purchasing power parities. The method's name comes from the surname initials of four contributors: Corrado Gini (1930), Eltetö Ödön, Pál Köves (1964), and Bohdan Szulc (1964).

It is thought to be a better approach than the Geary-Khamis dollar because does not rely on an average bundle, but rather the bundles from all countries.
