= Irving Kravis =

American economist

Irving B. Kravis (August 30, 1916 - January 3, 1992) was an American economist, best known for his work on international price comparisons, leading to the first version of the Penn World Table.

== Early life and education ==
Kravis was born in 1916. He obtained his undergraduate and graduate degrees at the University of Pennsylvania. There, he was a student of Simon Kuznets, whose interest in national income accounting was influential to Kravis's areas of research. Kravis would also follow Kuznets in associating with the National Bureau of Economic Research.

== Career ==
=== Military service ===
Kravis served the United States in World War II as a first lieutenant in China with the Flying Tigers, for which he received a Bronze Star.

=== Academic career at the University of Pennsylvania ===
After the war, Kravis returned to the University of Pennsylvania to become a faculty member. He served as chairman of the economics department from 1955 to 1958 and again from 1962 to 1967. He also served as associate dean of the Wharton School of Finance and Commerce (the business school of the University of Pennsylvania) from 1958 to 1960. In total, he was on the faculty of the University of Pennsylvania for 37 years.

Kravis played an important role in raising the prestige of the business school, strengthening the undergraduate program to make it more comparable to a liberal arts program, recruiting faculty, and instituting improvements in the quality of education to meet the expansion needs created by the Baby Boomers.

=== Research work ===
In the 1950s, during a visit to Paris, Kravis worked with Milton Gilbert, an economist at the Organisation for European Economic Cooperation (OEEC) (the predecessor to OECD) on international price comparison. This led to An International Comparison of National Products and the Purchasing Power of Currencies, published 1954, a pioneering work on international comparison of production and purchasing power.

In 1956, Kravis published a paper describing the non-availability approach, a theory of internationalization that says that countries import goods that are not available, or prohibitively expensive, at home.

In 1968, the International Comparison Program was created at the University of Pennsylvania by Kravis, Alan W. Heston, Robert Summers, and Zoltan Kenessey to house further research on price comparisons. Kravis, Heston, and Summers continued work on price comparisons, leading to a 1975 paper and then the 1978 paper Real GDP Per Capita for More Than One Hundred Countries that would be the first version of the Penn World Table.

Kravis collaborated on further versions of the Penn World Table; the next version, started in 1975, and published in 1982, incorporated the Geary–Khamis dollar for international price comparison. This was called "Phase III" of the ICP and the 1982 paper provided a definitive account of the standard procedures of the ICP.

One of Kravis's last NBER publications was a review, with Robert E. Lipsey, of the current status of problems with the International Comparison Program.

=== Awards and honors ===
Kravis received fellowships from the Ford Foundation as well as the John Simon Guggenheim Memorial Foundation (the Guggenheim Fellowship). He was a research associate of the National Bureau of Economic Research and a consultant to OECD. He was posthumously honored as Distinguished Fellow of the American Economic Association.

== Personal life ==
Kravis died on January 3, 1992, after falling ill at the Philadelphia airport on the way to receiving the Distinguished Fellow award of the American Economic Association. He had developed both lymphoma and Parkinson's disease at the time of his death. He was survived by his wife, sister, two sons, two daughters, and six grandchildren.
