= Waffle House Index =

Informal metric to rate disaster severity

A Waffle House mostly reduced to rubble in Biloxi, Mississippi, after Hurricane Katrina in 2005

The Waffle House Index is a metric named after the Southern US restaurant chain Waffle House known for its 24-hour, 365-day service. Because the restaurant chain is always open (except in extreme circumstances), it has given rise to an informal but useful metric to determine the severity of a storm and the likely scale of assistance required for disaster recovery. The metric was coined by Craig Fugate in August 2004 after Hurricane Charley. He was leading the Florida Division of Emergency Management. The metric is unofficially used by the Federal Emergency Management Agency (FEMA) to inform disaster response.

== Description ==
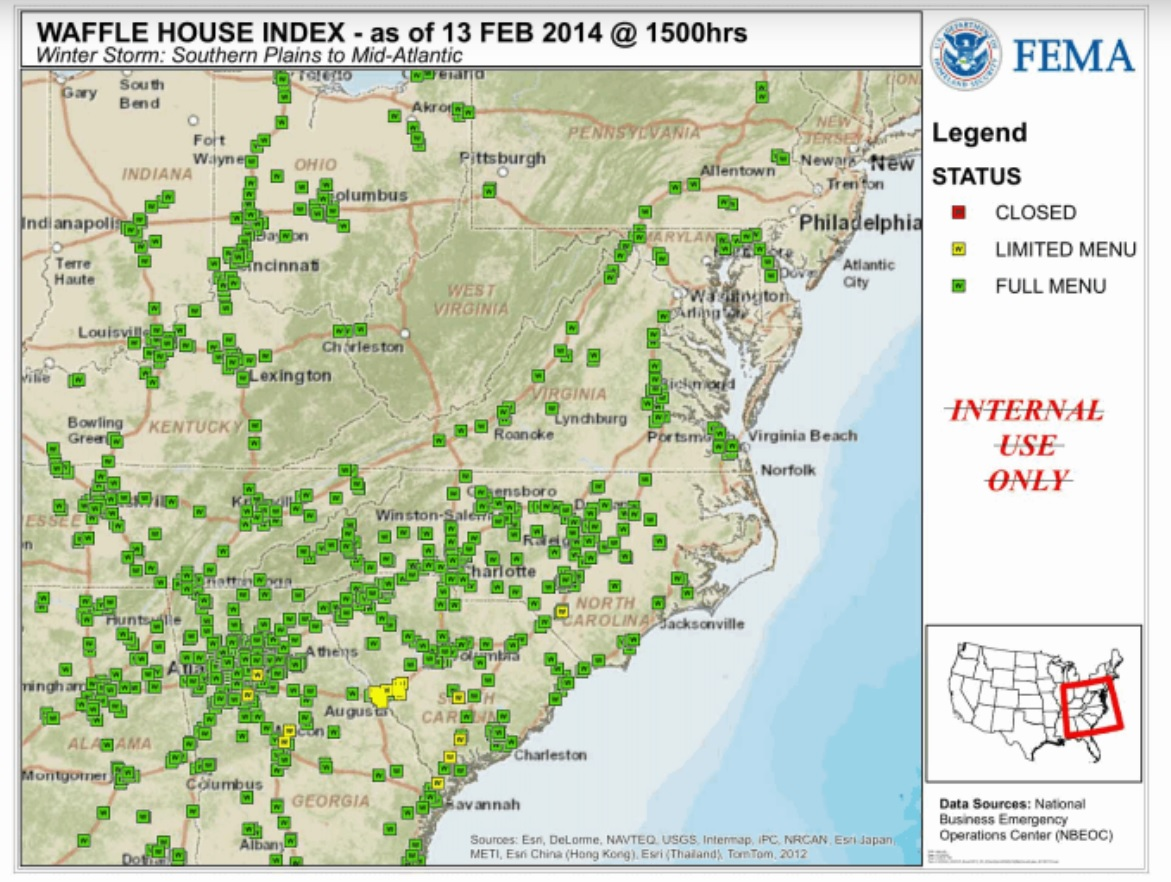
A Waffle House Index map prepared by FEMA during the February 2014 nor'easter, showing disruptions to operations in Georgia and South Carolina.

The index is based on Waffle House's reputation for strong disaster preparedness and for staying open during extreme weather or reopening quickly afterward.

If you get there and the Waffle House is closed? That's really bad...

— Craig Fugate, Former Head of the Federal Emergency Management Agency

=== Levels ===
The index consists of three levels, based on the extent of operations and service at the restaurant following a storm:

Level	Service	Implication
GREEN	Full menu	Restaurant has power and damage is minimal or absent.
YELLOW	Limited menu	Power is either unavailable or supplied by a generator, or food supplies are running low.
RED	Restaurant is closed	Severe or critical damage, flooding or other forms of destruction that discontinues operation.

=== Background ===
"When a Hurricane Strikes, Weather the Storm With Waffles" video news report from Voice of America, September 2018

In August 2004, following Hurricane Charley in Florida, Craig Fugate, who was leading Florida's Division of Emergency Management at the time, along with Tad Warfel and Ben Nelson, coined the scale based on the status of Waffle House restaurants still open in areas that had been hit by a disaster.

The phenomenon was also observed and reported by journalist Matt Dellinger in a 2006 article in The Oxford American, in which he noted that he had "found a way to map the destruction from Hurricane Katrina: look for Waffle Houses."

The term was also used by FEMA Administrator Craig Fugate in May 2011 following the Joplin tornado, during which the two Waffle House restaurants in Joplin remained open.

The measure is based on Waffle House's reputation for staying open during extreme weather and for reopening quickly after very severe weather events such as tornadoes or hurricanes. The chain's disaster preparedness measures include assembling and training "Waffle House jump teams" to facilitate fast reopening after disasters. Waffle House, along with other chains (such as Home Depot, Walmart, and Lowe's) which do a significant proportion of their business in the southern US where there is a frequent risk of hurricanes, have good risk management and disaster preparedness. Because of this, and the fact that a cut-down menu is prepared for times when there is no power or limited supplies, the Waffle House Index rarely reaches the red (closed) level.

The "Waffle House Index" sits alongside more formal measures of wind, rainfall, and other weather information, such as the Saffir–Simpson Hurricane Scale, which are used to indicate a storm's intensity.

Dan Stoneking, FEMA director of external affairs, wrote in a FEMA blog post:

As Craig [Fugate] often says, the Waffle House test doesn't just tell us how quickly a business might rebound – it also tells us how the larger community is faring. The sooner restaurants, grocery and corner stores, or banks can re-open, the sooner local economies will start generating revenue again – signaling a stronger recovery for that community. The success of the private sector in preparing for and weathering disasters is essential to a community's ability to recover in the long run.

— Dan Stoneking, FEMA News of the Day – What do Waffle Houses Have to Do with Risk Management?

A FOIA request response in 2017 included emails saying that the Waffle House Index was a personal project of Craig Fugate's, denying a connection between the Waffle House Index and FEMA's National Business Emergency Operations Center.

=== Examples ===
- In 2022, because of the expected severity of Hurricane Ian, 35 Waffle House restaurants closed in Florida prior to the storm's arrival. Hurricane Ian eventually made landfall as a Category 4 hurricane with winds of 150 miles per hour (240 km/h), peaking out over the Atlantic Ocean as a Category 5 hurricane.
- Ahead of Hurricane Helene in September 2024, a Waffle House in Crawfordville shut down, raising the Waffle House Index to red.
- In preparation for Hurricane Milton in October 2024, Waffle House announced that 25 Waffle House locations in the Tampa Bay area and eight in the Fort Myers area would close on October 8 prior to the storm's arrival.

== See also ==
- Big Mac Index – Economic index published by The Economist
- Tornado intensity and damage – Measurement of strength and severity of tornadoes
- Christmas Price Index
- List of humorous units of measurement
- List of unusual units of measurement
