= Law of one price =

Concept in economics

In economics, the law of one price (LOOP) states that in the absence of trade frictions (such as transport costs and tariffs), and under conditions of free competition and price flexibility (where no individual sellers or buyers have power to manipulate prices and prices can freely adjust), identical goods sold at different locations should be sold for the same price when prices are expressed in a common currency. This law is derived from the assumption of the inevitable elimination of all arbitrage.

See Rational pricing § The law of one price.

== Overview ==
The intuition behind the law of one price is based on the assumption that differences between prices are eliminated by market participants taking advantage of arbitrage opportunities.

There are three prerequisites underlying the law:

- Absence of trade frictions
- Free competition
- Price flexibility.

== Examples ==
=== In regular trade ===
Assume different prices for a single identical good in two locations, no transport costs, and no economic barriers between the two locations. Arbitrage by both buyers and sellers can then operate: buyers from the expensive area can buy in the cheap area, and sellers in the cheap area can sell in the expensive area.

Both scenarios result in a single, equal price per homogeneous good in all locations.

For further discussion, see Rational pricing.

=== In formal financial markets ===
Commodities can be traded on financial markets, where there will be a single offer price (asking price), and bid price. Although there is a small spread between these two values the law of one price applies (to each).

No trader will sell the commodity at a lower price than the market maker's bid-level or buy at a higher price than the market maker's offer-level. In either case moving away from the prevailing price would either leave no takers, or be charity.

In the derivatives market the law applies to financial instruments which appear different, but which resolve to the same set of cash flows; see Rational pricing. Thus:

A security must have a single price, no matter how that security is created. For example, if an option can be created using two different sets of underlying securities, then the total price for each would be the same or else an arbitrage opportunity would exist.

A similar argument can be used by considering arrow securities as alluded to by Arrow and Debreu (1944).

== Aspects of non-applicability ==
The law does not apply intertemporally, so prices for the same item can be different at different times in one market. The application of the law to financial markets is obscured by the fact that the market maker's prices are continually moving in liquid markets. However, at the moment each trade is executed, the law is in force (it would normally be against exchange rules to break it).

The law also need not apply if buyers have less than perfect information about where to find the lowest price. In this case, sellers face a tradeoff between the frequency and the profitability of their sales. That is, firms may be indifferent between posting a high price (thus selling infrequently, because most consumers will search for a lower one) and a low price (at which they will sell more often, but earn less profit per sale).

The Balassa–Samuelson effect argues that the law of one price is not applicable to all goods internationally, because some goods are not tradable. It argues that the consumption may be cheaper in some countries than others, because nontradables (especially land and labor) are cheaper in less-developed countries. This can make a typical consumption basket cheaper in a less-developed country, even if some goods in that basket have their prices equalized by international trade.

== Applications ==
The law of one price has been applied towards the analysis of many public events, such as:

- In 2015, an International Monetary Fund working paper found that the law of one price holds for most tradeable products in Brazil but does not apply in the same way to its non-tradeable goods.
- A director of the Council on Foreign Relations held in 2013 that the then-current Apple iPad mini followed the law of one price, as far as its price nearly reached the same US dollar exchange rate in each applicable country.
- Indonesian governmental oil subsidies against oil smugglers; The smugglers selling stolen government-discounted oil back to its market rate.
- An apparent violation of the law involving international Royal Dutch/Shell stocks. After merging in 1907, holders of Royal Dutch Petroleum (traded in Amsterdam) and Shell Transport shares (traded in London) were entitled to 60% and 40% respectively of all future profits. Royal Dutch shares should therefore automatically have been priced at 50% more than Shell shares. However, they diverged from this by up to 15%. This discrepancy disappeared with their final merger in 2005. In recent years the company has had two different shares, "A" and "B" shares. Although each carries the same rights to dividends etc, they usually trade at different prices. This can be explained by different tax treatments.

== See also ==
- Big Mac index
- Christmas Price Index
- Equal pay for equal work
- KFC Index
- Hemline index
- Men's underwear index
- Price
- Price discrimination
- Price dispersion
- Rational pricing
- Recession index
- Search theory
- Supply and demand
