= Penn World Table =

Data set for countries' GDPs

The Penn World Table (PWT) is a set of national-accounts data developed and maintained by scholars at the University of California, Davis and the Groningen Growth Development Centre of the University of Groningen to measure real GDP across countries and over time. Successive updates have added countries (currently 183), years (1950-2019), and data on capital, productivity, employment and population. The current version of the database, version 10, thus allows for comparisons of relative GDP per capita, as a measure of standard of living, the productive capacity of economies and their productivity level. Compared to other databases, such as the World Bank's World Development Indicators, the time period covered is larger and there is more data that is useful for comparing productivity across countries and over time.

A common practice for comparing GDPs across countries has been to use exchange rates. However, this assumes that this relative price – based on traded products – is representative of all relative prices in the economy, i.e. that it represents the purchasing power parity (PPP) of each currency. By contrast, PWT uses detailed prices within each country for different expenditure categories, regardless of whether the output is traded internationally (say, computers) or not (say, haircuts). These detailed prices are combined into an overall relative price level, typically referred to as the country's PPP. The detailed prices used to compute PPPs are based on data published by the World Bank as part of the International Comparison Program (ICP).

An empirical finding documented extensively by PWT is the Penn effect, the finding that real GDP is substantially understated when using exchange rates instead of PPPs in comparing GDP across countries. The most common argument to explain this finding is the Balassa-Samuelson effect, which argues that as countries grow richer, productivity increases mostly in manufacturing and other traded activities. This drives up wages and thus prices of many (non-traded) services, increasing the overall price level of the economy. The result is that poorer countries, such as China, are shown to be much richer based on PPP-converted real GDP than based on exchange-rate-converted GDP.

The database gets its name from the original developers at the University of Pennsylvania, Robert Summers, Irving Kravis and Alan Heston.

== See also ==
- List of countries by GDP (PPP) per capita, which includes information from Penn World Table.
- Maddison Project, a similar project but with a focus on historical economic statistics
