= Anita Summers =

American economist (1925–2023)

- Born: Anita Arrow; September 9, 1925; New York City, U.S.
- Died: October 22, 2023 (aged 98); Gladwyne, Pennsylvania, U.S.
- Spouse: Robert Summers (m. 1953; died 2012)
- Children: 3 sons (including Lawrence)
- Relatives: Kenneth Arrow (brother), Paul Samuelson (brother-in-law)

Academic background
- Education: University of Chicago; Hunter College

Academic work
- Institutions: Wharton School of the University of Pennsylvania

Anita Arrow Summers (September 9, 1925 – October 22, 2023) was an American educator of public policy, management, real estate and education and was a professor at the University of Pennsylvania.

== Biography ==
Anita Arrow was born in New York City on September 9, 1925. The daughter of Jewish immigrants from Romania, Summers received a B.A. in economics from Hunter College in 1945 and an M.A. from the University of Chicago in 1947. She earned an honorary doctorate from Hunter College. She married Robert Summers in 1953 and left the workforce to raise three sons.

In 1967, she began teaching economics at Swarthmore College. She led the urban economic department at the Federal Reserve Bank of Philadelphia from 1971 to 1979, when she joined the Wharton School of the University of Pennsylvania to start the first public policy department in a business school. She chaired that department from 1983 to 1988. She was a member of Provost's Academic Planning and Budget Committee from 1984 to 1990, in addition to many other University activities. She was Ombudsman of the University of Pennsylvania from 2001 to 2003.

Summers was a recipient of the Excellence in Teaching Awards at Wharton several times. She was a member of the board of directors and chair of the Audit Committee of Meridian Bancorp from 1987 to 1996. She was chair of the Board of Directors of Mathematica Policy Research from 1993 to 2010.

Summers was later on the Board of Trustees of Waverly Heights, Inc. and President of the Penn Association of Senior and emeritus Professors of the University of Pennsylvania.

Summers was also a senior research fellow at Wharton's Samuel Zell and Robert Lurie Real Estate Center. Summers authored and edited many books and reports.

She came from a family of well-known economists, including husband Robert Summers, son Lawrence Summers, brother Kenneth Arrow (who received a Nobel Prize in Economics in 1972) and brother-in-law Paul Samuelson (who received a Nobel Prize in Economics in 1970)

Anita Summers died in Gladwyne, Pennsylvania, on October 22, 2023, at the age of 98.

== Publications ==
- "Manual on procedure for using census data to estimate block income (Research papers - Dept. of Research, Federal Reserve Bank of Philadelphia)" 1975
- "Do schools make a difference? (Reprint series - Institute for Research on Poverty, University of Wisconsin)" 1977
- "Improving the use of empirical research as a policy tool: An application to education (Research paper - Federal Reserve Bank of Philadelphia)" 1979
- "What helps fourth grade students read?: A pupil-, classroom-, program-specific investigation (Research paper)" 1979
- "Urban Change in the United States and Western Europe: Comparative Analysis and Policy" 1993
- Anita A. Summers; Thomas F. Luce (1987). Economic Development Within the Philadelphia Metropolitan Area. University of Pennsylvania Press. ISBN 978-0-8122-1231-0.
- Anita A. Summers; P. C. Cheshire; Lanfranco Senn (1999). Urban Change in the United States and Western Europe: Comparative Analysis and Policy. The Urban Institute. ISBN 978-0-87766-683-7.
