= MeasuringWorth =

Price index calculation website

- Available in: English
- Parent: MeasuringWorth Foundation
- Website: measuringworth.com
- Registration: None
- Launched: 2006; 20 years ago
- Current status: Active

MeasuringWorth is a free online service to calculate relative economic value over time using price indexes. It has data sets, charts, and comparators for prices in several currencies and economic time series for stock markets and the price of gold. The site's comparisons over time were used in over 200 academic works each year in 2018 and 2019.

== Services ==
MeasuringWorth.com has calculators offering measures of the price of gold since the year 1257, comparisons of the British pound sterling to the U.S. dollar since 1791, and other "comparators." Such conversions make implicit assumptions about opportunity costs, and how the potential buyers and sellers would have used their resources given the available alternatives. Therefore, there are multiple comparators for the United States, the United Kingdom, Australia, and Spain. The site also hosts essays and academic papers on the subject of long-term comparisons of economic value.

== History ==
MeasuringWorth was originally a comparator hosted on the EH.net website created by economic historian Samuel H. Williamson and sponsored by the National Science Foundation. In 2006, after EH.net became the Economic History Association's web site, Williamson created a new website dedicated to the MeasuringWorth comparators and data sets.

== See also ==
- Measuring economic worth over time
- Price index – Normalized average of price changes for goods and services
- Purchasing power – Amount of goods and services that can be purchased with a unit of currency
