= Robert Summers (economist) =

American economist (1922–2012)

Robert Summers (June 22, 1922 – April 17, 2012) was an American economist and professor at the University of Pennsylvania, where he taught from 1960. A widely cited early work by Summers is on the small-sample statistical properties of alternate regression estimators where analytical measures are unavailable.

Summers was born in Gary, Indiana. He received his Ph.D. from Stanford University.

He was part of a team at Penn that developed estimates of national income and output across countries which adjust GDP and components for purchasing power parity in the cost of goods and services among different countries, later termed the Penn World Table. This yielded large, systematic differences from the common method of using only international exchange rates to convert national products to a common currency. For that work, Summers and Alan Heston were recognized as American Economic Association Distinguished Fellows for 1998.

Prior to joining the Penn faculty, Summers was on the faculty at Yale University.

Robert Summers was married to Anita Summers. Their son is Lawrence Summers. Robert Summers's brother was Paul Samuelson. (Their older brother Harold, a lawyer, changed his name to Summers in his youth, and Robert did the same.) Lawrence Summers also is a noted economist, as were Samuelson, Anita Summers, and her brother Kenneth Arrow. Summers died in 2012 at the age of 89 at his home in Gladwyne, Pennsylvania.

== See also ==
- Penn effect
