= Balassa–Samuelson effect =

Tendency for consumer prices to be systematically higher in more developed countries

The Balassa–Samuelson effect, also known as Harrod–Balassa–Samuelson effect (Kravis and Lipsey 1983), the Ricardo–Viner–Harrod–Balassa–Samuelson–Penn–Bhagwati effect (Samuelson 1994, p. 201), or productivity biased purchasing power parity (PPP) (Officer 1976) is the tendency for consumer prices to be systematically higher in more developed countries than in less developed countries. This observation about the systematic differences in consumer prices is called the "Penn effect". The Balassa–Samuelson hypothesis is the proposition that this can be explained by the greater variation in productivity between developed and less developed countries in the traded goods' sectors which in turn affects wages and prices in the non-tradable goods sectors.

Béla Balassa and Paul Samuelson independently proposed the causal mechanism for the Penn effect in the early 1960s.

== Theory ==
The Balassa–Samuelson effect depends on inter-country differences in the relative productivity of the tradable and non-tradable sectors.

=== Empirical "Penn Effect" ===
By the law of one price, entirely tradable goods cannot vary greatly in price by location because buyers can source from the lowest cost location. However, most services must be delivered locally (e.g. hairdressing), and many manufactured goods such as furniture have high transportation costs or, conversely, low value-to-weight or low value-to-bulk ratios, which makes deviations from the law of one price, known as purchasing power parity or PPP-deviations, persistent. The Penn effect is that PPP-deviations usually occur in the same direction: where incomes are high, average price levels are typically high.

=== Basic form of the effect ===
The simplest model which generates a Balassa–Samuelson effect has two countries, two goods (one tradable, and a country-specific nontradable) and one factor of production, labor. For simplicity assume that productivity, as measured by marginal product (in terms of goods produced) of labor, in the nontradable sector is equal between countries and normalized to one.

$MPL_{nt,1}=MPL_{nt,2}=1$

where "nt" denotes the nontradable sector and 1 and 2 indexes the two countries.

In each country, under the assumption of competition in the labor market the wage ends up being equal to the value of the marginal product, or the sector's price times MPL. (Note that this is not necessary, just sufficient, to produce the Penn effect. What is needed is that wages are at least related to productivity.)

$w_1=p_{nt,1}*MPL_{nt,1}=p_{t}*MPL_{t,1}$

$w_2=p_{nt,2}*MPL_{nt,2}=p_{t}*MPL_{t,2}$

Where the subscript "t" denotes the tradables sector. Note that the lack of a country specific subscript on the price of tradables means that tradable goods prices are equalized between the two countries.

Suppose that country 2 is the more productive, and hence, the wealthier one. This means that

$MPL_{t,1}<MPL_{t,2}$

which implies that

$p_{nt,1}<p_{nt,2}$.

So with a same (world) price for tradable goods, the price of nontradable goods will be lower in the less productive country, resulting in an overall lower price level.

=== Details ===
A typical discussion of this argument would include the following features:

- Workers in some countries have higher productivity than in others. This is the ultimate source of the income differential. (Also expressed as productivity growth.)
- Certain labour-intensive jobs are less responsive to productivity innovations than others. For instance, a highly skilled Zürich burger flipper is no more productive than his Moscow counterpart (in burger/hour) but these jobs are services which must be performed locally.
- The fixed-productivity sectors are also the ones producing non-transportable goods (for instance haircuts) – this must be the case or the labour intensive work would have been off-shored.
- To equalize local wage levels with the (highly productive) Zürich engineers, Zürich fast food employees must be paid more than Moscow fast food employees, even though the burger production rate per employee is an international constant.
- The CPI is made up of:
  - local goods (which in richer countries are more expensive relative to tradables), and
  - tradables, which have the same price everywhere
- The (real) exchange rate is pegged (by the law of one price) so that tradable goods follow PPP (purchasing power parity). The assumption that PPP holds only for tradable goods is testable.
- Since money exchange rates will vary fully with tradable goods productivity, but average productivity varies to a lesser extent, the (real goods) productivity differential is less than the productivity differential in money terms.
- Productivity becomes income, so the real income varies less than the money income does.
- This is equivalent to saying that the money exchange rate exaggerates the real income, or that the price level is higher in more productive, richer, economies.

=== Equivalent Balassa–Samuelson effect within a country ===
The average asking price for a house in a prosperous city can be ten times that of an identical house in a depressed area of the same country. Therefore, the RER-deviation exists independent of what happens to the nominal exchange rate (which is always 1 for areas sharing the same currency). Looking at the price level distribution within a country gives a clearer picture of the effect, because this removes some complicating factors:

1. The econometrics of purchasing power parity (PPP) tests are complicated by nominal exchange rate noise. (This noise would be an econometric problem, even assuming that the exchange rate volatility is a pure error term).
2. There may be some real economy border effects between countries which limit the flow of tradables or people.
3. Monetary effects, and exchange rate movements (Note: There may be a causal link from exchange rates to productivity, as well as (or instead of) the opposite direction of causation (from productivity to RERs) given by the BS-hypothesis model. Michael E. Porter's The Competitive Advantage of Nations says that currency depreciations can reduce growth, and that 'overvalued' currencies can contribute to domestic productivity growth by 'forcing' efficiency improvements in the tradables sector (by exposing it to international competition at unfavourable terms of trade). In fact, Singapore gave "Competitive Appreciation" as the official reason for the high SGD policy. (Lu & Yu 1999). Other mechanisms through which RERs can affect productivity growth have been advanced, such as the idea that structural transitions caused by exchange rate volatility have a disruptive effect on the real economy. There is some econometric evidence that the causality from exchange rates to productivity is more significant than the reverse, i.e. the BS-effect. (For instance, Strauss, Jack (1999), "Productivity Differentials, the Relative Price of Nontradables and Real Exchange Rates", Journal of International Money and Finance, 18 (3): 383–409, doi:10.1016/S0261-5606(99)85003-7.)) can affect the real economy and complicate the picture, a problem eliminated if comparing regions that use the same currency unit.
4. Taxes are very different in many countries, whereas in a same country taxes are usually equal or similar.

A pint of pub beer is famously more expensive in the south of England than the north, but supermarket beer prices are very similar. This may be treated as anecdotal evidence in favour of the Balassa–Samuelson hypothesis, since supermarket beer is an easily transportable, traded good. (Although pub beer is transportable, the pub itself is not.) The BS-hypothesis explanation for the price differentials is that the 'productivity' of pub employees (in pints served per hour) is more uniform than the 'productivity' (in foreign currency earned per year) of people working in the dominant tradable sector in each region of the country (financial services in the south of England, manufacturing in the north). Although the employees of southern pubs are not significantly more productive than their counterparts in the north, southern pubs must pay wages comparable to those offered by other southern firms in order to keep their staff. This results in southern pubs incurring a higher labour cost per pint served.

== Empirical evidence on the Balassa–Samuelson effect ==
Evidence for the Penn effect is well established in today's world (and is readily observable when traveling internationally). However, the Balassa–Samuelson (BS) hypothesis implies that countries with rapidly expanding economies should tend to have more rapidly appreciating exchange rates (for instance the Four Asian Tigers); conventional econometric tests yield mixed findings for this prediction.

In total, since it was (re)discovered in 1964, according to Tica and Druzic (2006) the HBS theory "has been tested 60 times in 98 countries in time series or panel analyses and in 142 countries in cross-country analyses. In these analyzed estimates, country specific HBS coefficients have been estimated 166 times in total, and at least once for 65 different countries". Many papers have been published since then. Bahmani-Oskooee and Abm (2005) & Egert, Halpern and McDonald (2006) also provide quite interesting surveys of empirical evidence on BS effect.

Over time, the testing of the HBS model has evolved quite dramatically. Panel data and time series techniques have crowded out old cross-section tests, demand side and terms of trade variables have emerged as explanatory variables, new econometric methodologies have replaced old ones, and recent improvements with endogenous tradability have provided direction for future researchers.

The sector approach combined with panel data analysis and/or cointegration has become a benchmark for empirical tests. Consensus has been reached on the testing of internal and external HBS effects (vis a vis a numeraire country) with a strong reservation against the purchasing power parity assumption in the tradable sector.

The vast majority of the evidence supports the HBS model. A deeper analysis of the empirical evidence shows that the strength of the results is strongly influenced by the nature of the tests and set of countries analyzed. Almost all cross-section tests confirm the model, while panel data results confirm the model for the majority of countries included in the tests. Although some negative results have been returned, there has been strong support for the predictions of a cointegration between relative productivity and relative prices within a country and between countries, while the interpretation of evidence for cointegration between real exchange rate and relative productivity has been much more controversial.

Therefore, most of the contemporary authors (e.g.: Egert, Halpern and McDonald (2006); Drine & Rault (2002)) analyze main BS assumptions separately:

1. The differential of productivities between the traded and non-traded sector and relative prices are positively correlated.
2. The purchasing power parity assumption is verified for tradable goods.
3. The RER and relative prices of non-tradable goods are positively correlated.
4. As a consequence of 1, 2, & 3, there is a long-run relationship between productivity differentials and the RER.

Refinements to the econometric techniques and debate about alternative models are continuing in the International economics community. For instance:

"A possible explanation of the BS empirical rejection may simply be that there are additional long-run real exchange determinants that have to be considered." Drine & Rault conclude.

The next section lists some of the alternative proposals to an explanation of the Penn effect, but there are significant econometric problems with testing the BS-hypothesis, and the lack of strong evidence for it between modern economies may not refute it, or even imply that it produces a small effect. For instance, other effects of exchange rate movements might mask the long-term BS-hypothesis mechanism (making it harder to detect if it exists). Exchange rate movements are believed by some to affect productivity; if this is true then regressing RER movements on differential productivity growth will be 'polluted' by a totally different relationship between the variables^{1}.

== Alternative, and additional causes of the Penn effect ==
Most professional economists accept that the Balassa–Samuelson effect model has some merit. However other sources of the Penn effect RER/GDP relationship have been proposed:

=== Distribution sector ===
In a 2001 International Monetary Fund working paper Macdonald & Ricci accept that relative productivity changes produce PPP-deviations, but argue that this is not confined to tradables versus non-tradable sectors. Quoting the abstract:

An increase in the productivity and competitiveness of the distribution sector with respect to foreign countries leads to an appreciation of the real exchange rate, similarly to what a relative increase in the domestic productivity of tradables does.

=== Differences in endowment of labor relative to capital ===
The Bhagwati–Kravis–Lipsey view provides a somewhat different explanation from the Balassa–Samuelson theory. This view states that price levels for nontradables are lower in poorer countries because of differences in endowment of labor and capital, not because of lower levels of productivity. Poor countries have more labor relative to capital, so marginal productivity of labor is greater in rich countries than in poor countries. Nontradables tend to be labor-intensive; therefore, because labor is less expensive in poor countries and is used mostly for nontradables, nontradables are cheaper in poor countries. Wages are high in rich countries, so nontradables are relatively more expensive.

=== Dutch disease ===
Capital inflows (say to the Netherlands) may stimulate currency appreciation through demand for money. As the RER appreciates, the competitiveness of the traded-goods sectors falls (in terms of the international price of traded goods).

In this model, there has been no change in real economy productivities, but money price productivity in traded goods has been exogenously lowered through currency appreciation. Since capital inflow is associated with high-income states (e.g. Monaco) this could explain part of the RER/Income correlation.

Yves Bourdet and Hans Falck have studied the effect of Cape Verde remittances on the traded-goods sector. They find that, as local incomes have risen with a doubling of remittances from abroad, the Cape Verde RER has appreciated 14% (during the 1990s). The export sector of the Cape Verde economy suffered a similar fall in productivity during the same period, which was caused entirely by capital flows and not by the BS-effect. (Note: The BS-hypothesis would still explain the Cape Verde price index rise in its own terms if the incomes from rising emigrant's remittances were counted as local traded-goods 'productivity' increases. In their study of Cape Verde, Bourdet & Falck found that the export sector strengthened during the 1990s period of currency appreciation, which might support the theory of "Competitive Appreciation" mentioned in the footnote above)

=== Services are a 'superior good' ===
Rudi Dornbusch (1998) and others say that income rises can change the ratio of demand for goods and services (tradable and non-tradable sectors). This is because services tend to be superior goods, which are consumed proportionately more heavily at higher incomes.

A shift in preferences at the microeconomic level, caused by an income effect can change the make-up of the consumer price index to include proportionately more expenditure on services. This alone may shift the consumer price index, and might make the non-traded sector look relatively less productive than it had been when demand was lower; if service quality (rather than quantity) follows diminishing returns to labour input, a general demand for a higher service quality automatically produces a reduction in per-capita productivity.

A typical labour market pattern is that high-GDP countries have a higher ratio of service-sector to traded-goods-sector employment than low-GDP countries. If the traded/non-traded consumption ratio is also correlated with the price level, the Penn effect would still be observed with labour productivity rising equally fast (in identical technologies) between countries.

=== Protectionism ===
Lipsey and Swedenborg (1996) show a strong correlation between the barriers to free trade and the domestic price level. If wealthy countries feel more able to protect their native producers than developing nations (e.g. with tariffs on agricultural imports) we should expect to see a correlation between rising GDP and rising prices (for goods in protected industries - especially food).

This explanation is similar to the BS-effect, since an industry needing protection must be measurably less productive in the world market of the commodity it produces. However, this reasoning is slightly different from the pure BS-hypothesis, because the goods being produced are 'traded-goods', even though protectionist measures mean that they are more expensive on the domestic market than the international market, so they will not be "traded" internationally (Note: A typical reason for, and result of, trade barriers, is that domestic productivity of some tradable-good is below international productivity. In order to protect domestic producers import barriers are raised, allowing the local price for the traded good to rise beyond the international price. If this were a common phenomenon then one of the key assumptions of the BS-hypothesis (that traded-goods follow the PPP-hypothesis) would be invalid. However, the essence of the Balassa–Samuelson mechanism would still remain: Even without Free trade it may be harder to increase the productivity in the service sector as rapidly as in mass-production, so if money exchange rates are still based on the output of mass production the differentials in price level could still be caused by the Balassa–Samuelson effect.)

== Trade theory implications ==
The supply-side economists (and others) have argued that raising international competitiveness through policies that promote traded goods sectors' productivity (at the expense of other sectors) will increase a nation's GDP, and increase its standard of living, when compared with treating the sectors equally. The Balassa–Samuelson effect might be one reason to oppose this trade theory, because it predicts that: a GDP gain in traded goods does not lead to as much of an improvement in the living standard as an equal GDP increase in the non-traded sector. (This is due to the effect's prediction that the CPI will increase by more in the former case.)

== History ==
The Balassa–Samuelson effect model was developed independently in 1964 by Béla Balassa and Paul Samuelson. The effect had previously been hypothesized in the first edition of Roy Forbes Harrod's International Economics (1939, pp. 71–77), but this portion was not included in subsequent editions.

Partly because empirical findings have been mixed, and partly to differentiate the model from its conclusion, modern papers tend to refer to the Balassa–Samuelson hypothesis, rather than the Balassa–Samuelson effect. (See for instance: "A panel data analysis of the Balassa-Samuelson hypothesis", referred to above.)

== See also ==
- List of international trade topics
- Free trade, economic inequality, and per capita income
- Mathematical economics, and econometrics
