= Recession index =

Informal economic indicator

The recession index (the R-word index) is an informal index created by The Economist which counts how many stories in The Washington Post and The New York Times use the word “recession” in a quarter.

This simple formula pinpointed the start of recessions in 1981, 1990, and 2001, but was misleading in the early 1990s, when the index indicated a recession for a year after it had officially ended in March 1991.

The index has inspired serious research into testing whether the tone and volume of economic reporting over time has affected people's perceptions. Mark Doms (Federal Reserve Bank of San Francisco) and Norman Morin (Board of Governors of the Federal Reserve System) (2004) created indexes based on the number of articles that contain certain keywords and phrases in the title or first paragraph in the thirty largest newspapers across the US. For instance, the "recession index" is based on the number of articles that mention "recession" or "economic slowdown.".

== See also ==
- Big Mac Index
- Christmas Price Index
- List of unusual units of measurement
- List of humorous units of measurement

== Sources ==
- "The recession index — Words that can harm you — Nov 21st 2002". The Economist. 2002-11-21. Archived from the original on 2012-10-11.
- "R-word index — Warning lights". The Economist, WASHINGTON, DC. 2008-01-10. Archived from the original on 2008-09-26.
