= Janis Kravis =

Latvian architect (1935–2020)

- Born: October 20, 1935; Riga, Latvia
- Died: July 16, 2020 (aged 84); North York, Ontario
- Education: University of Toronto
- Website: https://www.karelia.ca

Janis Kravis (October 20, 1935 – July 16, 2020) was a Latvian architect who established Toronto's first concept store, Karelia, in 1959. A combination café, studio, and retail store, Karelia was a hub for Toronto's mid-century creatives that introduced Marimekko textiles and contemporary Finnish designs to central Canada.

Karelia has been noted as “the city’s entry point for the anti-drab aesthetics of Scandinavian modernism.”

== Career ==
=== Design Career and Recognition ===
Kravis was an influential designer as well as an entrepreneurial importer and merchandiser of contemporary housewares and textiles. Establishing an architecture and design practice in 1963, he designed Three Small Rooms, a concept restaurant for the basement of the Windsor Arms Hotel; the Four Seasons Hotel in Belleville; and the Constellation Hotel in Toronto, which became Scandinavian-inspired landmarks.

Three Small Rooms is recognized as Kravis’ biggest design achievement as he designed and selected every element down to the staff uniforms. The commission included Kravis’ three legged chair which became part of the 2016 exhibition “True Nordic: How Scandinavia Influenced Design in Canada” at the Gardiner Museum in Toronto. The project won many accolades including a design award from the OAA and the Province of Ontario, Department of Tourism in 1967 and the 25 Year Award of Merit in Architectural Excellence awarded by the OAA in 1989. Upon its demolition, the design community was dismayed that the site had not been given heritage status.

In all, the interiors and furniture that Kravis designed during his 60-year career for commercial, corporate, and hospitality clients was characterized “by spatial ingenuity, crafted millwork, colourful textiles, and detailed ceilings designed to activate the interior volume – either with suspended space frames, intricately layered grids, milled wood battens, or innovative lighting.”

Kravis was an early proponent of sustainable design. Initiating the RAIC Interiors Committee and as a Founding member of the OAA Committee on the Environment, Kravis was a leader in steering the profession toward environmentally responsible design and sustainability in buildings. In addition, he was a member of the Canadian Green Building Council and a LEED Accredited Professional.

In 2007, Kravis was awarded a lifetime achievement award at the 3rd Annual Toronto Regional Green Building Festival at Ontario Place which “celebrates the success of visionaries who recognized the importance of sustainable buildings and energy efficiency years ago, and have been working to make green building a reality today.”

== Karelia (1959-1979) ==
Karelia studio was established by Kravis in 1959. From the beginning it "facilitated the Marimekko brand’s early international growth and impact in Canada” — a brand which sparked an international revolution in post-WWII pattern and textile production.” Extending beyond the Toronto community, the studio was also instrumental in raising the awareness and appreciation of contemporary design nationally selling unique furniture, textiles, clothing, housewares and décor from Scandinavian and European designers such as Artek, Haimi, Muurame, Arabia and Iittala.

Kravis founded the boutique after obtaining a bachelor's degree in Architecture from the University of Toronto where he became familiar with Alvar Aalto and the Finnish design movement. At the time, he worked in the office of modernist architectural firm, John B. Parkin Associates, where he met the Finnish architect, Viljo Revell who, along with his associates, won the international competition to design the new Toronto city hall during the 1970s when Toronto wasn't a particularly design-savvy place. Revell and his colleagues introduced Kravis to many important Scandinavian designers and encouraged Kravis to visit Finland where he met and developed a close and lasting friendship with Armi Ratia, the founder of Marimekko. Beginning as the pioneering importer of Marimekko, Kravis moved Karelia to its first independent space in the thriving George Street Village.

Becoming a retail leader in the 60s and 70s, the trajectory of Karelia paralleled broader patterns of urban gentrification in the city. Outgrowing the George Street location, Kravis moved the shop to Lothian Mews which initiated the small-scale shopping explosion that defined the village of Yorkville in midtown Toronto.

In the 1960s, at the height of Scandinavian inflected cultural life in Toronto, Karelia moved to the Manulife Centre at Bloor and Bay Streets, and Kravis opened a second location in the newly invigorated St. Lawrence Market neighbourhood on Front Street East. Integrating, for the first time in Toronto, a Coffee Shop in the Front Street location in 1976 it became a dynamic meeting place for Toronto's design and architecture community. The initial success of the Toronto boutique led to the establishment of Karelia International in 1969, with stores later extending to Vancouver in 1973 and Edmonton in 1978.

Karelia closed in the 1980s due to financial troubles. However, the ongoing international exchange of ideas since its opening inspired and shaped the cultural worlds of Finland and North America.

In 2013, The Textile Museum of Canada in Toronto held the exhibition “Marimekko with Love” which revisited objects from the Karelia archives and traveled to Victoria, B.C., and Seattle.
