= Alan Heston =

American economist (1934–2024)

Alan W. Heston (October 18, 1934 – October 26, 2024) was an American economist best known for his collaborative work with fellow economist Robert Summers and the development of the Penn World Table (PWT).

== Education and early life ==
Heston was born in 1934, and raised in Portland, Oregon. In 1955, he received his B.A. in economics from the University of Oregon. He received his M.A. in economics from the University of Washington in 1957. In 1962, he received his Ph.D. in economics from Yale University, where he studied under James Tobin, the winner of the 1981 Nobel Memorial Prize in Economic Sciences.

== Academic career ==
Heston was a professor emeritus in the Department of Economics at the University of Pennsylvania, where he taught from 1962. Prior to teaching at the University of Pennsylvania, Heston was an assistant professor at Yale University.

Heston co-directed (with Robert Summers) the University of Pennsylvania's Center for International Comparisons (CIC). The precursor to CIC was the United Nations’ (UN) International Comparison Programme (ICP), which Heston joined in its first year in 1968. The ICP developed the first systematic multilateral set of purchasing power comparisons. Heston participated in the ICP's benchmark comparisons and, by 1985, with Summers and Irving Kravis, expanded the number of countries included in the comparison database to 34 countries. That same year Heston and Summers developed benchmark comparisons of gross domestic product estimates on a purchasing power basis for non-benchmark countries for one year. Heston and Summers continued these comparisons and extended the estimates over both time and space in an effort that became the Penn World Table. For that work, Summers and Alan Heston were recognized as American Economic Association Distinguished Fellows in 1998. Heston is considered a leading world expert on international economic comparisons and purchasing power parity.

== Penn World Table ==
In 1991, Heston co-authored with Summers a Quarterly Journal of Economics article titled "The Penn World Table (Mark 5): An Expanded Set of International Comparisons." This article describes the Penn World Table as a set of national-accounts economic time series covering 138 countries. Penn World Table expenditure entries are denominated in a common set of prices in a common currency to enable real quantity comparisons between countries and over time. The table also provides relative price details within and between countries, demographic data, and capital stock estimates. The article introduced an updated, revised, and expanded version of the table with broader applicability to researchers, and was one of the most cited economic papers of the 1990s. Heston's and Summers’ techniques and data are widely used and cited, and a number of international organizations have adopted their methodology.

In developing the Penn World Table, Heston, with Kravis and Summers, produced a series of three publications in 1975, 1978, and 1982. These publications provided the detailed methodology of their international measurement approach to multilateral comparisons. The three economists developed an international price index for the valuation of each country's quantities. These formulas came into the limelight as the re-structuring and assistance programs of the major multilateral investment institutions gained traction in the 1980s and required more refined data for loan and assistance programs.

Heston died on October 26, 2024, at the age of 90.
