= Purchasing power =

Amount of goods and services that can be purchased with a unit of currency

Purchasing power refers to the amount of products and services available for purchase with a certain currency unit. For example, if one spends a single unit of currency at a store to purchase products, then returns at a later date and spends a single unit of currency but is unable to purchase as many products as they had previously, the currency's purchasing power has decreased.

If one's income remains constant but prices rise, their purchasing power decreases. Inflation does not always result in decreased purchasing power, especially if income exceeds price levels. A larger real income means more purchasing power, as it corresponds to the income itself.

Traditionally, the purchasing power of money depended heavily upon the local value of gold and silver, but was also made subject to the availability and demand of certain goods on the market. Most modern fiat currencies, like US dollars, are traded against each other for the purpose of international transfer of payment for goods and services.

Scottish economist Adam Smith noted that having money gives one the ability to "command" others' labor, so purchasing power to some extent is power over other people, to the extent that they are willing to trade their labor or goods for money or currency.

For a price index, its value in the base year is usually normalized to a value of 100. The purchasing power of a unit of currency, say a dollar, in a given year, expressed in dollars of the base year, is 100/P, where P is the price index in that year. So, by definition, the purchasing power of a dollar decreases as the price level rises.

Adam Smith used an hour's labour as the purchasing power unit, so value would be measured in hours of labour required to produce a given quantity (or to produce some other good worth an amount sufficient to purchase the same).

== See also ==
- Big Mac Index
- Collective buying power
- Constant purchasing power accounting
- Consumer price index
- Consumerism
- Consumption (economics)
- Fair trade
- Free trade
- Group buying
- Group purchasing organization
- International dollar
- Measuring economic worth over time
- Purchasing power parity
- Real gross domestic product
