= Tradability =

Viability of selling products far from their place of production

Tradability is the property of a good or service that can be sold in another location distant from where it was produced. A good that is not tradable is called non-tradable. Different goods have differing levels of tradability: the higher the cost of transportation and the shorter the shelf life, the less tradable a good is. Prepared food, for example, is not generally considered a tradable good; it will be sold in the city in which it is produced and does not directly compete with other cities' prepared foods. Some non-commodities and services such as haircuts and massages are also obviously non-tradable. However, in recent years even pure services such as education can be regarded as tradable due to advancements in information and communications technology.

== Price equalization ==
Perfectly tradable goods, like shares of stock, are subject to the law of one price: they should cost the same amount wherever they are bought. This law requires an efficient market. Any discrepancy that may exist in pricing perfectly tradable goods because of foreign currency price movements, for instance, is called an arbitrage opportunity. Goods that cannot be costlessly traded are not subject to this law.

Less than perfectly tradable goods are subject to distortions such as the Penn effect, for example, a lowering of prices in less wealthy place. Perfectly non-tradable goods are not subject to any leveling of price, thus the disparity between similar parcels of real estate in different locations.

There should be no distortions in purchasing power parity for perfectly tradable goods. The differences between it and other methods are the result of non-tradable goods and the above-mentioned Penn effect.
