= Ingo Walter =

Ingo Walter is a professor of finance, corporate governance and ethics as well as Vice Dean of Faculty at New York University's Stern School of Business.

== Academic Interests ==
Walter researches and consults in the areas of international trade policy, international banking, environmental economics, and economics of multinational corporate operations.

Professor Walter received his A.B. and M.S. degrees from Lehigh University, and his Ph.D. degree in 1966 from New York University. He taught at the University of Missouri - St. Louis from 1965 to 1970 and has been on the faculty at New York University since 1970. He held a joint appointment as Professor of International Management at INSEAD from 1986 to 2005 and remains a visiting professor there.

== Books ==
Walter is the author, co-author, or editor of 26 books, including:

- Walter, Ingo; Roy Smith (2006). Governing the Modern Corporation. New York: Oxford University Press. ISBN 0-19-517167-5.
- Walter, Ingo (2004). Mergers and Acquisitions in Banking and Finance: What Works, What Fails and Why?. New York: Oxford University Press. ISBN 0-19-515900-4.
- Walter, Ingo; Roy Smith (2000). High Finance in the Euro-Zone. London: Prentice Hall. ISBN 0-273-63737-1.
- Walter, Ingo (1997). The Political Economy of European Financial Integration. Cambridge: MIT Press. ISBN 0-262-69203-1.
- Walter, Ingo (1997). Street Smarts: Linking Professional Conduct and Shareholder Value in the Securities Industry. Boston: Harvard Business School Press. ISBN 0-87584-653-X.
- Walter, Ingo (1990). The Secret Money Market: Inside the dark world of Tax Evasion, Financial Fraud, Insider Trading, Money Laundering, and Capital Flight. New York, NY: Harper Business. ISBN 0-88730-489-3.
