= Christmas Price Index =

Humorous economic indicator

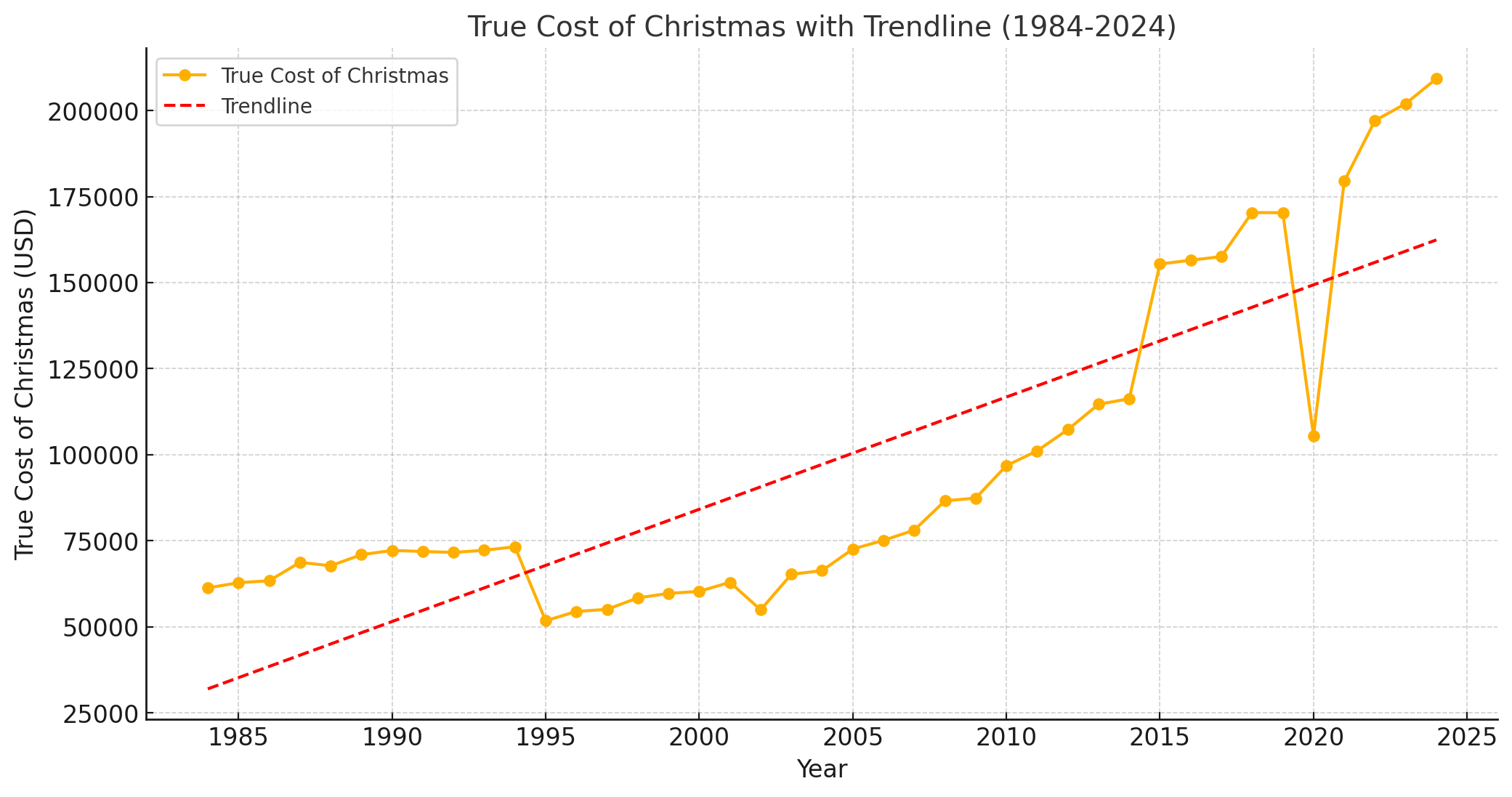
True cost of Christmas, 1984–2024

The Christmas Price Index is a tongue-in-cheek economic indicator, maintained by the U.S. bank PNC Wealth Management, which tracks the cost in USD of the items in the carol "The Twelve Days of Christmas". The woman responsible for maintaining the list since 1986 is Rebekah M. McCahan.

== Origins ==
The Christmas Price Index was conceived by the Chief Economist of Provident National Bank as a humorous commodity price index to measure the changing cost of goods over time. Commodity price indices, as compiled by economics, use a "market basket" of certain goods and then measure the cost of the goods from year to year to gauge inflation in different sectors of the economy.

The Christmas Price Index chose the items in the popular Christmas carol "The Twelve Days of Christmas" as its market basket: a partridge in a pear tree, two turtle doves, three French hens, four calling birds, five golden rings, six geese, seven swans, eight maids, nine dancing ladies, ten leaping lords, eleven pipers, and twelve drummers. According to tradition, the purchasing of the items begins on December 25 and ends on January 5.

== Methodology ==
Number of gifts of each type and number received each day and their relationship to figurate numbers

PNC compiles both a "Christmas Price Index" and "The True Cost of Christmas". The "Christmas Price Index" is calculated by adding the cost of the items in the song. The "True Cost of Christmas", however, is calculated by buying a partridge in a pear tree on each of the twelve days, buying two turtle doves from the second day onward, for a total of 22 turtle doves, etc., for the complete set of 364 items.

The price of each item is set as follows:

- The pear tree comes from a local Philadelphia nursery.
- The partridge, turtle dove, and French hen prices are determined by the Cincinnati Zoo and Botanical Garden.
- The price of a canary at Petco is used for the calling bird, though the price of a blackbird (colly bird) may reflect the original version of the song.
- Gordon Jewelers sets the cost of the gold rings, though the gold rings of the song may actually refer to ring-necked pheasants.
- The maids are assumed to be unskilled laborers earning the US federal minimum wage.
- The Philadelphia Dance Company provides estimates for the salary of "ladies dancing".
- The Philadelphia Ballet estimates the salary for the "leaping lords".
- The going rate for drummers and pipers is that of a Pennsylvania musicians' union.

== Results ==
Christmas Price Index (US$)
Year	Christmas Price Index	Δ% in CPI	True Cost of Christmas
1984	$12,623.10	+1.44%	$61,318.94
1985	$12,765.99	+1.13%	$62,818.92
1986	$12,920.25	+1.21%	$63,402.22
1987	$13,871.75	+7.36%	$68,740.80
1988	$13,785.63	−0.62%	$67,745.74
1989	$14,598.78	+5.90%	$70,961.21
1990	$15,231.72	+4.34%	$72,205.12
1991	$15,455.79	+1.47%	$71,907.19
1992	$15,581.96	+0.82%	$71,618.71
1993	$15,760.70	+1.15%	$72,258.42
1994	$15,944.20	+1.16%	$73,258.42
1995	$12,481.65	−21.72%	$51,764.94
1996	$13,195.86	+5.72%	$54,478.36
1997	$13,343.86	+1.12%	$55,086.26
1998	$14,214.90	+6.53%	$58,405.09
1999	$14,940.17	+5.10%	$59,719.33
2000	$15,210.22	+1.81%	$60,307.18
2001	$15,748.81	+3.54%	$62,935.17
2002	$14,558.05	−7.56%	$54,951.31
2003	$16,885.28	+15.99%	$65,264.28
2004	$17,296.91	+2.44%	$66,334.46
2005	$18,348.87	+6.08%	$72,608.02
2006	$18,920.59	+3.12%	$75,122.03
2007	$19,507.25	+3.10%	$78,100.10
2008	$21,080.10	+8.06%	$86,608.51
2009	$21,465.56	+1.83%	$87,402.81
2010	$23,439.38	+9.20%	$96,824.29
2011	$24,263.18	+3.50%	$101,119.84
2012	$25,431.18	+6.1%	$107,300.24
2013	$27,393.18	+7.70%	$114,651.18
2014	$27,673.21	+1.00%	$116,273.06
2015	$34,130.99	+0.6%	$155,407.18
2016	$34,363.49	+0.7%	$156,507.88
2017	$34,558.65	+0.6%	$157,558.00
2018	$38,926.03	+11.2%	$170,362.26
2019	$38,993.59	+0.17%	$170,298.03
2020	$16,168.14	-58.5%	$105,561.80
2021	$41,205.58	+5.7% (+64.6%) (Note: The 2021 index increased by 5.7% based on the last comparable figure in 2019, or by 64.6% compared to the reduced 2020 index.)	$179,454.19
2022	$45,523.27	+10.5%	$197,071.09
2023	$46,729.86	+2.7%	$201,972.66
2024	$49,263	+5.4%	$209,272
2025	$51,476.12	+4.5%	$218,542.98

Like other lighthearted economic indicators, such as The Economist's Big Mac Index which tracks the price of the Big Mac hamburger in different countries, the Christmas Price Index nevertheless produces results which have meaningful interpretations.

In general, the prices in the index have reflected the growing service economy in the United States—prices for goods have mostly fallen, but prices for labor have risen greatly. The cost of hiring ladies and lords, for example, has risen over 300 percent. After the high cost of the dancers, the seven swans are the most expensive item on the index; the unpredictable breeding cycle of swans makes their supply uncertain, and in 1995 a US Trumpeter swan breeding program led to their price halving. Much as the United States Consumer Price Index excludes volatile energy and food prices from its "core" index, the core Christmas Price Index excludes the swans; for 2008, the total price index rose 8.1% from 2007, while the core index rose only 1.1%. The cheapest item in the index is the partridge, which, in 2008, could be purchased for $20. Costs have generally risen and fallen along with the standard Consumer Price Index.

The survey also tracks the cost of ordering the items online; doing so is significantly more expensive, in part due to shipping costs. In 2008, PNC estimated the total cost at $31,956.62, up 2.3% from 2007, while purchasing all 364 items online would cost $131,150.76, an increase of 1.8%. However, if the buyer were to purchase each item from the least expensive vendor, the total index would be $19,844.95, a discount of 5.86%.

The 2020 index did not include nine Ladies Dancing, ten Lords-A-Leaping, eleven Pipers Piping, or twelve Drummers Drumming due to COVID-19 restrictions on live performances.

In 2019, an attempt was made to calculate a redneck version of the index for Jeff Foxworthy's "Redneck 12 Days of Christmas." The calculation was hampered by the overwhelming cost of one of the twelve items on Foxworthy's list, "nine years' probation," which was calculated from the salary of a probation officer over nine years and subtracting the cost to the state to incarcerate someone over that same length of time; this entry accounted for 98% of the over $275,000 index, which itself was seven times higher than the corresponding standard Christmas Price Index. Discounting the probation, the 11 remaining items cost $6,019.36.

== Criticisms ==
The Christmas Price Index has been criticized for a number of reasons. First, the index does not clearly define the products that comprise each of the twelve gifts. For example, the price for the eight "maids a-milking" only includes the cost of eight laborers at federal minimum wage, while milking also requires at least a milk cow, goat, or other such animals, which is an additional cost.

Second, the index also relies on only one data source per gift when a more reliable approach might use several retailers.

Third, the index prices products that do not actually correspond with the actual gift described. The ten "lords a-leaping" are valued by using the cost of hiring male ballet dancers instead of real lords, as lordships are a title of nobility not recognized in the United States.
