= World Development Indicators =

World Bank database

World Development Indicators (WDI) is the World Bank’s premier compilation of international statistics on global development. Drawing from officially recognized sources and including national, regional, and global estimates, the WDI provides access to approximately 1,600 indicators for 217 economies, with some time series extending back more than 50 years. The database helps users find information related to development, both current and historical. The topics covered in the WDI range from poverty, health, and demographics to GDP, trade, and the environment.

The World Development Indicators website provides access to data as well as information about data coverage, curation, and methodologies, and allows users to discover what type of indicators are available, how they are collected, and how they can be visualized to analyze development trends.

== Data sources ==
A share of the indicators in WDI come from World Bank Group surveys and data collection efforts, but the majority are based on data originally collected, compiled and published by other sources, including other international organizations such as UN specialized agencies (sometimes in cooperation with the World Bank), national statistical offices, organizations with a specific research or monitoring focus, the private sector, and academic studies.

== Accessing the data ==
The World Bank’s Open Data site provides access to the WDI database free of charge to all users. Users can browse the data by Country, Indicators, Topics, and via the Data Catalog. The WDI database can be accessed directly via DataBank, a query tool where users can select series, economies, and time periods, and do bulk downloads in Excel or CSV, or via API. In addition, data can be programmatically accessed using Stata, R, and Python modules.

== WDI and the Sustainable Development Goals ==
World Development Indicators takes a comprehensive view of the world and currently includes many of the official SDG indicators as well as other data that are relevant to SDGs. For example, in addition to official indicators on the income/consumption growth of the bottom 40 percent of the population relative to the average as per SDG target 10.1, the WDI presents indicators like the Gini index or income shares by decile or quintile that are relevant for SDG goal 10 on inequality. SDG related indicators can also be explored in the SDG dashboard, which uses WDI data.
