= International Comparison Program =

Compares global prices and economic output data

The International Comparison Program (shortened ICP) is a partnership of various statistical administrations of up to 199 countries guided by the World Bank. The main partners of this program are the World Bank, IMF, UN, ADB, OECD, CISSTAT, Eurostat, AfDB ESCWA, ECLAC, DFID, ABS, IDB, NMoFA who are also all part of the executive board.

The Program produces internationally comparable price and volume measures for gross domestic product (GDP). Its component expenditures are based on purchasing power parities (PPPs). The International Comparison Program holds surveys collecting price and expenditure data for the entire range of final goods and services at intervals of some few years (the last two were separated by six years). The surveys cover GDPs of countries including their consumer goods, services, government services and capital goods. The ICP tries to make different countries GDPs comparable by calculating them in PPP both currency converters and spatial price deflators.

The responsibility for the ICP within regions is shared between the national and regional agencies which represent various countries. National statistical offices carry out data collection but regional agencies provide guidance, collection, coordinating of data and data validation. Regional agencies also put together and finalize the regional comparisons.

The ICP has published its PPP results ten times so far – the first time for 1970 (a preliminary study for 1967 was also carried out) and the latest for 2021.

== See also ==
- Big Mac Index
- International dollar
- List of countries by GDP (PPP)
- List of countries by GDP (PPP) per capita
- Measures of national income and output
- Purchasing power parity
- Relative purchasing power parity
- World Bank
