= Big Mac Index =

Economic index published by The Economist

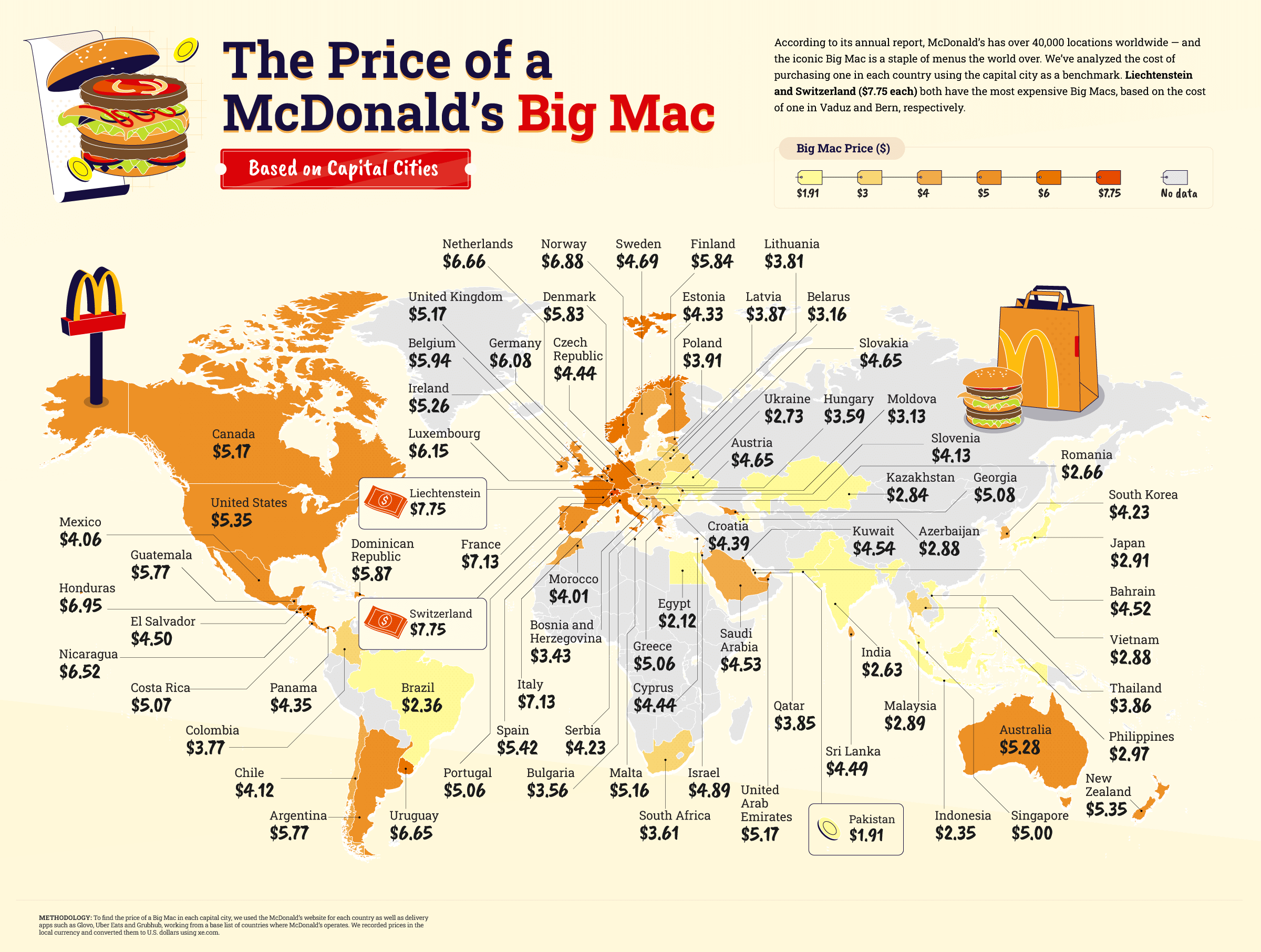
Big Mac index, November 2022

The Big Mac Index is a price index published since 1986 by The Economist as an informal way of measuring the purchasing power parity (PPP) between two currencies and providing a test of the extent to which market exchange rates result in goods costing the same in different countries. It "seeks to make exchange-rate theory a bit more digestible." The index compares the relative price worldwide to purchase the Big Mac, the flagship hamburger sold at McDonald's restaurants.

== Overview ==
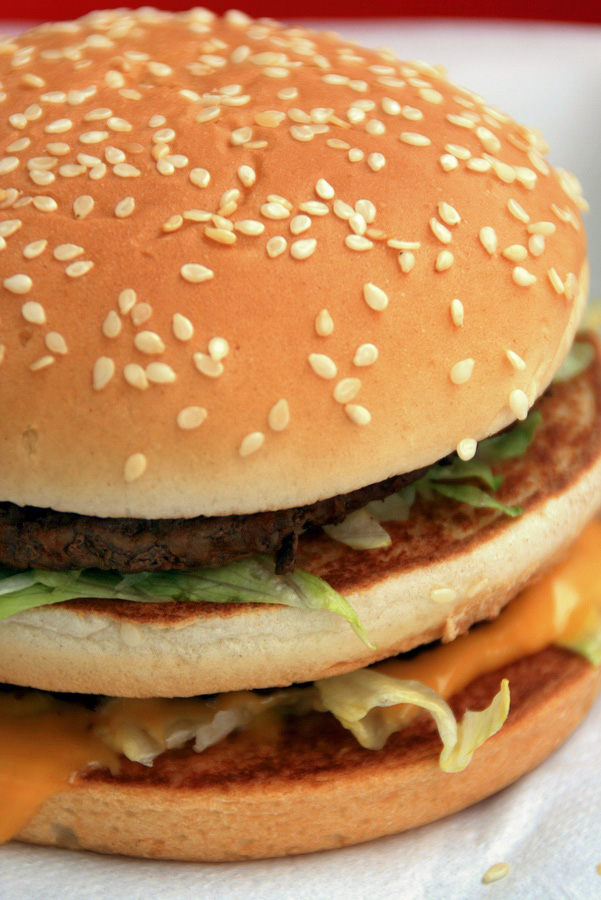
A McDonald's Big Mac hamburger

The Big Mac index was introduced in The Economist in September 1986 by Pam Woodall as a semi-humorous illustration of PPP and has been published by that paper annually since then. Although the Big Mac Index was not intended to be a legitimate tool for exchange rate evaluation, it is now globally recognised and featured in many academic textbooks and reports. The index also gave rise to the word burgernomics.

The theory underpinning the Big Mac index stems from the concept of PPP, which states that the exchange rate between two currencies should equalize the prices charged for an identical basket of goods. However, in reality, sourcing an identical basket of goods in every country provides a complex challenge. According to the Organisation for Economic Co-operation and Development (OECD), over "3,000 consumer goods and services, 30 occupations in government, 200 types of equipment goods and about 15 construction projects" are included in the current PPP calculations. In an effort to simplify this important economic concept, The Economist proposed that a single McDonald's Big Mac could be used instead of a basket of goods. A McDonald's Big Mac was chosen because of the prevalence of the fast food chain worldwide, and because the sandwich remains largely the same across all countries. Although a single sandwich may seem overly simplistic for PPP theory, the price of a Big Mac is derived from the culmination of "many local economic factors, such as the price of the ingredients, local wages, or how much it costs to put up billboards and buy TV ads". As a result, the Big Mac index provides a "reasonable measure of real-world purchasing power".

The purpose of the Big Mac index is to calculate an implied exchange rate between two currencies. In order to calculate the Big Mac index, the price of a Big Mac in a foreign country (in the foreign country's currency) is divided by the price of Big Mac in a base country (in the base country's currency). Typically, the base country used is the United States.

For example, using figures from July 2023:

1. In Switzerland, a Big Mac costs 6.70 Swiss francs.
2. In the U.S., a Big Mac costs US$5.58.
3. The implied exchange rate is 1.20 francs per dollar, that is 6.70 francs/$5.58 = 1.20.

Consistent with PPP economic theory, the Big Mac index also provides a method to analyse a currency's level of under/over-valuation against a base currency. In order to calculate whether a currency is under/over-valued, the implied exchange rate (as defined by the Big Mac index) must be compared to the actual exchange rate. If the implied exchange rate is greater than the actual exchange rate, then the analysed currency is overvalued against the base currency. If the implied exchange rate is less than the actual exchange rate, then the analysed currency is undervalued against the base currency.

For example, using figures for July 2023:

1. The implied exchange rate according to the Big Mac index is 1.20 francs per dollar
2. The actual exchange rate is 0.87 francs per dollar
3. The Swiss franc is overvalued by 38.5% against the U.S. dollar, that is (1.20-0.87)/0.87 = 38.5%

== Variants ==
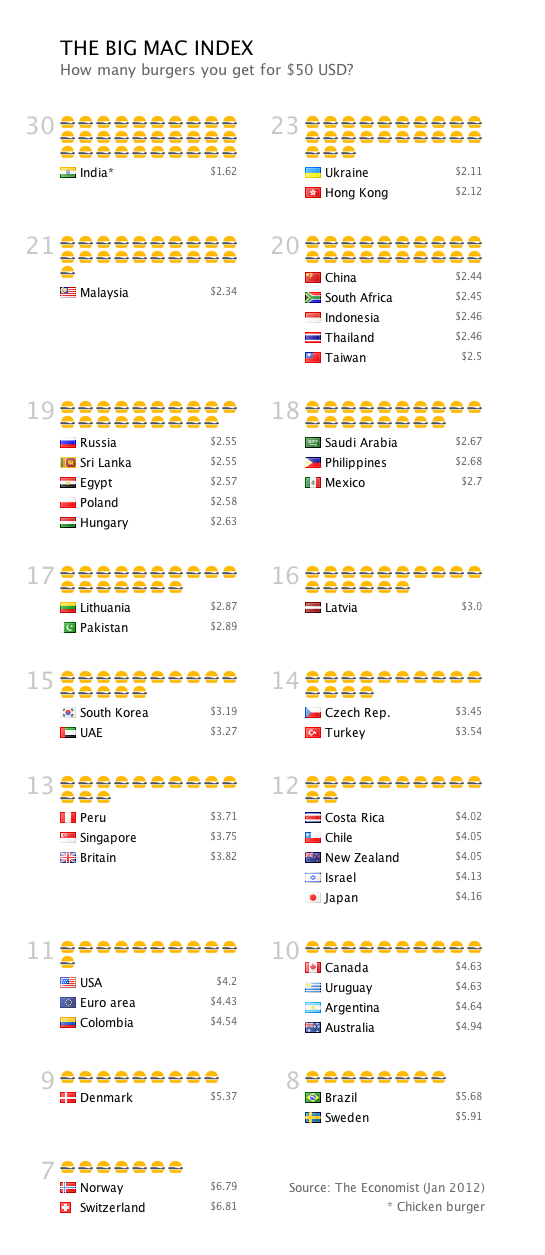
- How many burgers do you get for $50? (January 2012, equivalent to $70 in 2025)
  The Economist sometimes produces variants on the theme. For example, in January 2004, it showed a Tall Latte index with the Big Mac replaced by a cup of Starbucks coffee.
- Bloomberg L.P. introduced the Billy index where they convert local prices of IKEA's Billy bookshelf into U.S. dollars and compare the prices.

== Limitations ==
While economists widely cite the Big Mac index as a reasonable real-world measurement of purchasing power parity, the burger methodology has some limitations.

Map of countries with at least one McDonald's restaurant, showing the lack of restaurants in Africa (2022)

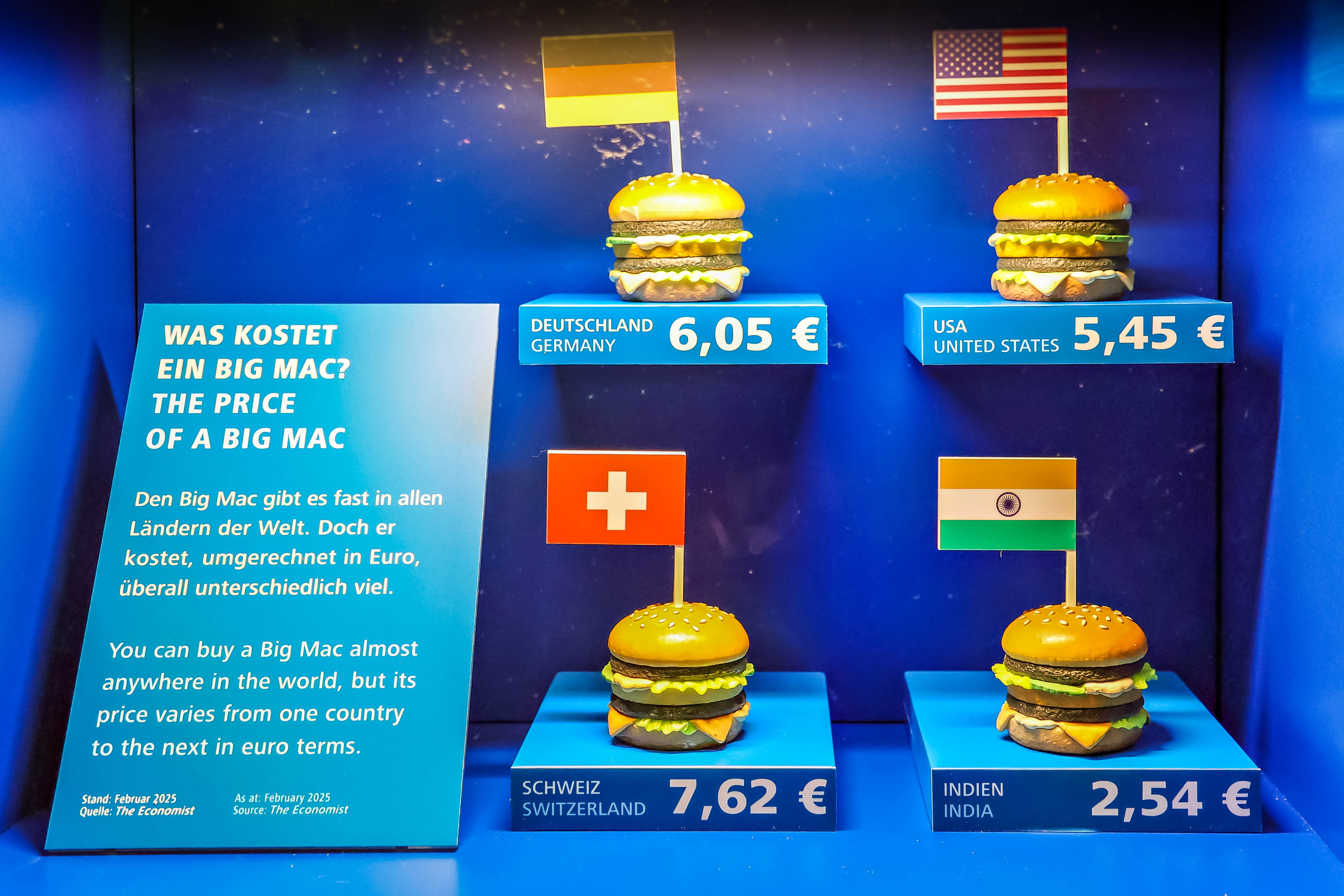
Exhibit on the Big Mac Index in the Money Museum Frankfurt (2025)

The Big Mac Index is limited by geographical coverage, due to the presence of the McDonald's franchise. For example, in Africa McDonald's is only present in Morocco, Egypt, South Africa and Mauritius (there has been a similar index created solely for Africa called the "KFC Index": as the name suggests, instead of using a Big Mac, this index uses KFC's Original 15-piece bucket to compile its data).

In many countries, eating at international fast-food chain restaurants such as McDonald's is relatively expensive in comparison to eating at a local restaurant, and the demand for Big Macs is not as large in countries such as India as in the United States. Social status of eating at fast food restaurants such as McDonald's in a local market, what proportion of sales might be to expatriates, local taxes, levels of competition, and import duties on selected items may not be representative of the country's economy as a whole.

In addition, there is no theoretical reason why non-tradable goods and services such as property costs should be equal in different countries: a pound of American beef used in the Big Mac's patties is not the same price as a pound of beef in China. This is the theoretical reason PPPs differ from market exchange rates over time. The relative cost of high-margin products, such as essential pharmaceutical products or cellular telephony, might compare local capacity and willingness to pay as much as relative currency values.

Nevertheless, McDonald's is also using different commercial strategies which can result in huge differences for a product. Overall, the price of a Big Mac will be a reflection of its local production and delivery cost, the cost of advertising (considerable in some areas), and most importantly what the local market will bear – quite different from country to country, and not all a reflection of relative currency values.

In some markets, a high-volume and low-margin approach makes most sense to maximize profit, while in others a higher margin will generate more profit. Thus the relative prices reflect more than currency values. For example, a hamburger costs only €1 in France, and €1.50 in Belgium, but overall, McDonald's restaurants in both countries cost roughly the same. Prices of Big Macs can also vary greatly between different areas within a country. For example, a Big Mac sold in New York City will be more expensive than one sold at a McDonald's located in a rural area.

One other example is that Russia had one of the cheapest Big Macs at its time in 2019, despite the fact that Moscow was then the most expensive city in the world. Standard food ingredients are cheap in Russia, while restaurants suitable for business dinners with English speaking staff are expensive.

=== Manipulation ===
Critics of the presidency of Cristina Fernández de Kirchner in Argentina and many economists believe that the government falsified consumer price data for years to understate the country's true inflation rate. The Economist stated in January 2011 that the Big Mac index "does support claims that Argentina's government is cooking the books. The gap between its average annual rate of burger inflation (19%) and its official rate (10%) was far bigger than in any other country." That year the press began reporting on unusual behavior by the more than 200 Argentinean McDonald's restaurants. They no longer prominently advertised Big Macs for sale and the sandwich, both individually and as part of value meals, was being sold for an unusually low price compared to other items. Guillermo Moreno, Secretary of Commerce in the Kirchner government, reportedly forced McDonald's to sell the Big Mac at an artificially low price to manipulate the country's performance on the Big Mac index. In June 2012, the price of the Big Mac value meal suddenly rose by 26%, closer to that of other meals, after The Economist, The New York Times, and other media reported on the unusual pricing. A Buenos Aires newspaper stated "Moreno loses the battle".

=== Comparison issues ===
The Big Mac (and virtually all sandwiches) vary from country to country with differing nutritional values, weights and even nominal size differences.

Not all Big Mac burgers offered by the chain are exclusively beef. In India – which is a predominantly Hindu country – beef burgers are not available at any McDonald's outlets. The Chicken Maharaja Mac serves as a substitute for the Big Mac.

There is a lot of variance with the exclusively beef "Big Mac": the Australian version of the Big Mac has 22% fewer calories than the Canadian version, and is 8% lighter than the version sold in Mexico.

On 1 November 2009, all three of the McDonald's in Iceland closed, primarily due to the high cost of importing most of the chain's meat and vegetables, by McDonald's demands and standards, from the Eurozone. At the time, a Big Mac in Iceland cost 650 krona ($5.29), and the 20% price increase that would have been needed to stay in business would have increased that cost to 780 krona ($6.36). Fish and lamb are produced in Iceland, while beef is often imported (but also exported).

== Figures ==
Six most expensive (July 2023) This statistic shows the most expensive places to buy a Big Mac.

1. Switzerland – $7.73 (6.70 CHF)
2. Norway – $6.92 (70 NOK)
3. Uruguay – $6.86 (259 UYU)
4. Argentina – $5.99 (1,650 ARS)
5. EU – $5.82 (5.28 EUR)
6. Sweden – $5.74 (60.27 SEK)

Six cheapest (July 2023) This statistic shows the least expensive places to buy a Big Mac.

1. Taiwan – $2.39 (75 TWD)
2. Indonesia – $2.52 (38,000 IDR)
3. India – $2.54 (209 INR)
4. Egypt – $2.62 (81.00 EGP)
5. South Africa – $2.81 (49.90 ZAR)
6. Philippines – $2.82 (155 PHP)

Six fastest earned (July 2015) This statistic shows the average working time required to buy one Big Mac in selected cities around the world in 2015.

1. Hong Kong – 8.6 min
2. Luxembourg – 10.3 min
3. Japan, Tokyo – 10.4 min
4. Switzerland, Zürich – 10.6 min
5. United States, Miami – 10.7 min
6. Switzerland, Geneva – 10.8 min

Six slowest earned (July 2015) This statistic shows the average working time required to buy one Big Mac in selected cities around the world in 2015.

1. Kenya, Nairobi – 172.6 min
2. Philippines, Manila – 87.5 min
3. Mexico, Mexico City – 78.4 min
4. Indonesia, Jakarta – 66.7 min
5. Egypt, Cairo – 62.5 min
6. Ukraine, Kyiv – 54.7 min

== See also ==
- Banana equivalent dose
- Christmas Price Index
- Golden Arches Theory of Conflict Prevention
- Li Keqiang index, another index by The Economist
- List of countries by price level
- List of humorous units of measurement
- List of unusual units of measurement
- Recession index
- Waffle House Index
