= The European Miracle =

1981 book by Eric Lionel Jones

The European Miracle: Environments, Economies and Geopolitics in the History of Europe and Asia
- Author: Eric Jones
- Language: English
- Genre: History, economic theory
- Publisher: Cambridge University Press
- Publication date: 1981
- Publication place: Australia
- Media type: Hardback
- Followed by: Growth Recurring: Economic Change and World History

The European Miracle: Environments, Economies and Geopolitics in the History of Europe and Asia is a book written by Eric Jones in 1981 providing a historical interpretation of the sudden rise of Europe during the late Middle Ages. Surging ahead of the Islamic and Chinese civilizations in the early modern period, the book claims, Europe rose in global power and prominence to a complete domination of world trade and politics that remained unchallenged until the early 20th century.

This process started with the first European contacts and subsequent colonization of great expanses of the world. The Industrial Revolution further reinforced it.

Jones's book gave rise to the term European miracle. It is closely related to the idea of the Great Divergence, which applies a similar lens to a later period in history, theorizing the 18th-century culmination of the European miracle process and the subsequent "imperial century" of Britain.

== Summary ==
Jones aims to explain why modern states and economies developed first in the peripheral and late-coming culture of Europe. He attempts to argue a concatenation of various factors, in particular the interplay of natural and economic factors that has worked to Europe's advantage and to the disadvantage of its Asian competitors.

The European miracle theory purports that, as women began marrying later and having fewer children, the development of the European nuclear family led to better population control in Europe compared than in the rest of the world, which "multiplied insensately." Europe was thus not vulnerable to Malthusian crises and so could form a progressive capitalist society.

Urbanization is also adduced as a factor. Crucially, the cities were also semi-autonomous, especially the Italian city-states. The growth of banking, accounting and general financial infrastructure in such cities is seen as unique and vital to the rise of Europe.

== Reception ==
Jones's study is one of the most influential books dedicated to the question of European exceptionalism. Some historians, in particular those of the "California school", feel that Jones overstated the degree of difference between Europe and non-European regions on the eve of the Industrial Revolution.

The attention attracted by the book has also resulted in it being described by the American historian Joel Mokyr as "the whipping boy of those who have resented what they viewed as historiographical triumphalism, eurocentricity, and even racism." It has been attacked by thinkers such as James Blaut, Andre Gunder Frank, Kenneth Pomeranz, and John M. Hobson, who accuse Jones of Eurocentrism and "cultural racism" (Blaut's term).

== See also ==
- Western empires
- Early Modern Europe
- Age of Exploration
- Dutch Golden Age
- Spanish Golden Age
- Pan-European identity
- Eurocentrism
- Great Divergence
- The Enlightenment

== Editions ==
- Jones, Eric (1981). The European Miracle: Environments, Economies and Geopolitics in the History of Europe and Asia. Cambridge University Press. ISBN 978-0-521-52783-5.
- Jones, Eric (1987). The European Miracle: Environments, Economies and Geopolitics in the History of Europe and Asia. Cambridge University Press. ISBN 978-0-521-33670-3.
- Jones, Eric (2003). The European Miracle: Environments, Economies and Geopolitics in the History of Europe and Asia. Cambridge University Press. ISBN 978-0-521-52783-5.
