= The WEIRDest People in the World =

2020 book by Joseph Henrich

The WEIRDest People in the World How the West Became Psychologically Peculiar and Particularly Prosperous
- Author: Joseph Henrich
- Subject: Evolutionary psychology, European history
- Publisher: Farrar, Straus and Giroux
- Publication date: 8 September 2020
- Media type: Print
- Pages: 704 pp (hardcover)
- ISBN: 978-0374173227

The WEIRDest People in the World: How the West Became Psychologically Peculiar and Particularly Prosperous is a 2020 book by Harvard University professor Joseph Henrich that aims to explain history and psychological variation using approaches from cultural evolution and evolutionary psychology. In the book, Henrich explores how institutions and psychology jointly influence each other over time. More specifically, he argues that a series of Catholic Church edicts on marriage that began in the 4th century undermined the foundations of kin-based society and created the more analytical, individualistic thinking prevalent in western societies.

== Summary ==
The first part, "The Evolution of Societies and Psychologies", describes WEIRD (Western, Educated, Industrialized, Rich and Democratic) populations "in broad strokes", according to reviewer Pauline Grosjean. Henrich discusses the research of Richard Nisbett suggesting that people in WEIRD cultures think reductively with a focus on personal attributes and intentions, while Asians think holistically with a focus on relationships and situations. Non-Westerners will emphasize family connections and allegiances. Henrich also presents a large body of evidence that WEIRD people are more trusting of strangers and more likely to give blood than most humans. Westerners, according to reviewer Judith Shulevitz, "identify more as members of voluntary social groups—dentists, artists, Republicans, Democrats, supporters of a Green Party—than of extended clans."

The second part of the book, "The Origins of WEIRD People", provides a comparative political account of how societies have used religion to scale up from families to states. More specifically, the author draws on an array of qualitative and quantitative evidence to argue that religious beliefs, impersonal markets, urbanization and competition among voluntary associations like guilds, charter towns, universities and religious orders shifted people's psychology and social lives. Uniquely, the author both discusses how present-day institutions shape psychology and seats these processes in an account of the past.

The third section, "New Institutions, New Psychologies", is about how the Catholic Church and its offshoot, Protestantism, shaped early institutions and psychology, paving the way (in the view of the author) for modern institutions. While accounts of modern history frequently argue that the Protestant Reformation created individualism and a belief in rule of law, Henrich argues that edicts by the Church that he calls the "Marriage and Family Program" (MFP) reduced clannishness, making Western Europeans more analytic and individualistic, leading to various intermediating institutions and trust in abstract rules.

In the final section, "Birthing the Modern World," Henrich specifically challenges the "rationalist" view that modern Western institutions resulted from reason triumphing over religious dogma. Instead, he argues that these institutions are the accidental byproduct of specific policies of the Catholic Church that dismantled Europe’s kin-based institutions. Without clan backing, the Church left nuclear families isolated and vulnerable, forcing them to innovate to survive and, ultimately, create the modern world.

== Reception ==
In The Week, the book was billed as "a work of dazzling ambition ... Henrich goes to great pains to back [his arguments] up with a huge variety of 'data points' and statistics." Andrew Wilson of The Gospel Coalition dubbed the book "sweeping, polymathic, counterintuitive, and provocative. In a number of places, it looks like Henrich is shoehorning facts into his theory ... but he hits far more than he misses ... the splutters of incredulity you experience are more than made up for by the breadth and chutzpah of the narrative." Wilson compared it with the work of N. T. Wright. Wilson had also discussed the Philip Jenkins book Fertility and Faith (which makes a different argument), and described it as "more focused" than The WEIRDest People in the World.

In Kirkus Reviews it was praised as a "fascinating, vigorously argued work that probes deeply into the way 'WEIRD people' think."

Hilton Root, Professor of Public Policy at George Mason University, said that despite "jumping from the fifth century to the High Middle Ages ... the book makes a significant contribution to the study of what makes the West unique and will be a landmark of early twenty-first-century social science." He further argues that Henrich's application of social science to uncover universal laws of social science was methodologically original and that there is strong evidence for limiting kinship in the development of modernity, but notes that a reader would not learn about more general context of European society, citing as an example that the Henrich's merely noted in passing that marriage rules did not apply to elites. They also argue that tracing the psychology of Western society to a Church ban on cousins weddings is "itself WEIRD".

Judith Shulevitz of The Atlantic was skeptical of the claim that WEIRD and non-WEIRD people possess opposing cognitive styles, saying differences in subjects' personal experience may be the reason for differences in Triad Task responses. She also said the author's "indifference to individual and institutional intentions is guaranteed to drive historians nuts." However, Shulevitz argued that through this "macro-cultural relativism," Henrich provides a "big-picture approach [that] soars above the reigning paradigms in the study of European history ... Henrich offers a capacious new perspective that could facilitate the necessary work of sorting out what's irredeemable and what's invaluable in the singular, impressive, and wildly problematic legacy of Western domination."

A reviewer in The Economist said they were not fully convinced of Henrich's thesis that the Roman Catholic church ushered in a more fluid society, saying that more likely "the medieval church was negotiating with, rather than moulding, a social reality which was evolving fast as cities emerged." The reviewer also criticized the dichotomy between Western-style and kinship-intensive societies, noting that one family can contain a range of roles and attitudes.

Pauline Grosjean, Professor in the School of Economics at University of New South Wales, noted in Science that marriage age has varied over time and that the colonies of the U.S. and Australia (places with abundant land) saw a sharp drop in marriage age among migrating 19th century Europeans; she described this as evidence against Henrich's suggestion that the Church's marriage prohibitions explain the Europeans' propensity for late marriage, though both the U.S. and Australia had sentiments of anti-Catholicism as both were more Protestant in their formation. Additionally, she said Henrich fails to address "the role that states may have played as competitors and regulators of the Church".

Philosopher Daniel Dennett praised The WEIRDest People in the World as an "engagingly written, excellently organized and meticulously argued book ... One of the first lessons that must be learned from this important book is that the WEIRD mind is real; ... we must stop assuming that our ways are 'universal.'" However, Dennett claimed that on "why the church fathers enforced these prohibitions so tenaciously against resistance over the centuries, this is still a bit of a mystery. ... This book calls out for respectful but ruthless vetting".

Razib Khan wrote that "Henrich's engrossing narrative is filled with neat facts and insightful theories. The sequence of coincidences and correlations across history, psychology, and anthropology make for compelling reading." Khan said the author "makes a strong case that the Christian Church's MFP was the cause for the transformation of Western European society during the medieval period. ... But the second half of the book is arguably much more tendentious, as the author attempts to answer the great riddle of economic historians, the 'great divergence' between the West and the rest."

Nicholas Guyatt of The Guardian anticipated that scholars would point out the uneven effects of the church's "marriage and family programme" across time and space; the Protestant church accepting cousin marriage more than its Catholic rival; and the increase in cousin marriage across many European societies in the 17th and 18th centuries. Guyatt also said the book insufficiently discusses the wrongs of the west, overly stereotypes non-WEIRD societies, lacks insight into the phenomenon of non-Europeans carrying ideas and practices; and emphasizes "the supposedly discrete nature of culture and [the] virtues of 'weird' thinking" almost to the point of endorsing social Darwinism. Henrich said that the book aims to fill the void often used by white supremacists (the absence in public discourse of scientific explanations for global diversity) with a deep "explanation for these patterns, and how off-the-mark those claiming genetics or 'superior' cultures are."

The journalist Coleman Hughes has also referenced Henrich's book when criticizing hereditarianism and discussing the impact of culture on psychology.

Brysbaert (2026) remarked that Henrich's book fails to mention that among the WEIRD people, those from English-speaking countries are often seen as the standard, against which others are compared. He proposed to use the term WEIRDES people (from Western, Educated, Industrialized, Rich, Democratic and English-Speaking countries) to refer to the English centricity of much psychological research.
