= Shulevitz =

Shulevitz (Hebrew: שולביץ) is a surname of Jewish origin. Notable people with the surname include:

- Judith Shulevitz (born 1963), American journalist, columnist, editor and culture critic
- Uri Shulevitz (1935–2025), American writer and illustrator of children's books
