= The Eastern Origins of Western Civilisation =

Book by John M. Hobson

- The cover, showing a Zheng He treasure ship behind Columbus's Santa María
- Author: John M. Hobson
- Language: English
- Subject: World History
- Publisher: Cambridge University Press
- Publication date: 5 July 2004
- Publication place: United Kingdom
- Media type: Print (Hardback & Paperback)
- Pages: 392
- ISBN: 0-521-54724-5

The Eastern Origins of Western Civilisation, written by the political scientist John M. Hobson in 2004, is a book that argues against the historical theory of the rise of the West after 1492 as a "virgin birth", but rather as a product of Western interactions with a more technically and socially advanced Eastern civilization.

The text reinterprets Eurocentric ideas of Europe's contributions to world development. For example, it provides evidence that a complex system of global trade existed long before Mercantilist Europe, that social and economic theories in the Enlightenment came from encounters with new cultures rather than with Greek and Roman heritage, and that modern European hegemony resulted from situational advantages rather than from inherent superior traits.

== Key ideas ==
- Many inventions critical to European progress were Chinese innovations.
- Europeans appropriated many Eastern resources such as land, labour and markets through imperialism.
- European powers did not create world trade, but rather used American silver to integrate into bustling Indian and Chinese markets.
- The belief that European hegemony derived from free trade, reasoned rule, and democracy is a patriotic myth. European powers won trading rights by force, and Britain developed the industrial revolution under harsh regulations.
- Cultural movements and ideas were spurred by contact with the outside world, particularly with the East.

== Response ==
A reviewer for the Culture Mandala wrote Hobson's work "complements and builds on the insights of Frank, Braudel and others to illustrate in great detail both how substantial China's historical achievement has been and how much the West has distorted history to serve the purpose of its imperial civilizing mission".

John Hall of McGill University, writing in the English Historical Review, asserted that Hobson's work is prone to wild exaggerations and "tends to cite only those parts of an author’s work that agree with his argument, and misses out whole realms of scholarship". Hobson, Hall continues, "tends to give us bad sociology," and his construct of Eurocentrism is "often a straw man." Hall remarks that Hobson makes "odd claims," such as asserting that "Adam Smith depended upon Chinese intellectual discoveries," and that Hobson's "general picture seems to fail".

== See also ==
- James Morris Blaut
- Andre Gunder Frank
- Samir Amin
- Jack Goldstone
- Roy Bin Wong
- Jack Goody
- Kenneth Pomeranz
- Victor Lieberman
- Tonio Andrade
- Janet Abu-Lughod
- Angus Maddison
