= James Morris Blaut =

Professor of anthropology and geography

- Born: October 27, 1927; New York City, New York U.S.
- Died: November 11, 2000 (aged 73); Chicago, Illinois, U.S.
- Occupation: Anthropologist
- Years active: 1958–2000
- Known for: Anti-Eurocentrism

Academic background
- Education: University of Chicago

Academic work
- Discipline: Geography
- Institutions: Clark University; University of Puerto Rico; College of the Virgin Islands; University of Illinois at Chicago

James Morris Blaut (October 20, 1927 – November 11, 2000) was an American professor of anthropology and geography at the University of Illinois at Chicago. His studies focused on agricultural microgeography (geographical activity of villagers), cultural ecology, theory of nationalism, philosophy of science, historiography and the relations between the First and the Third World. He was a critic of Eurocentrism. Blaut was one of the most widely read authors in the field of geography.

== Life and career ==
James Morris Blaut was born on October 20, 1927, in New York City. He attended the Little Red School House and Elisabeth Irwin High School. He entered the University of Chicago in 1944 at the age of sixteen, as part of the program for advanced high-school students, and achieved two bachelor's degrees (in 1948 and 1950). Next, from 1948 to 1949, he studied at the New School for Social Research, from 1949 to 1950 at the Imperial College of Tropical Agriculture in Trinidad, and from 1950 at Louisiana State University. After the end of the Korean War, he also served in the United States Army, and was involved in an incident which resulted in the court-martial of his commander and the dismissal of the camp's commandant. In 1954, he was drafted into the army, went to basic training at Camp Gordon, Georgia and served for two years rising to the rank of private first class.

He received his PhD in 1958, at which time he was already working at Yale University. In 1960, he moved to the University of Puerto Rico, where he stayed till 1963. In 1964 he moved to the College of the Virgin Islands. In 1967 he returned to the United States for a position at Clark University, where in 1969 he helped establish the Antipode Journal and the Union of Socialist Geographers. In 1971, told that his activities and ideas were too extreme for Clark, he moved back to the University of Puerto Rico, and finally to University of Illinois at Chicago.

Blaut died from heart failure at his home on November 11, 2000, before he had completed a trilogy of books criticizing Eurocentric theories of a "European miracle". The series begins with The Colonizer’s Model of the World and is followed by Eight Eurocentric Historians, in which he accuses Max Weber, Lynn White, Robert Brenner, Jared Diamond, Eric Jones, Michael Mann, John A. Hall, and David Landes of eurocentrism.

He was a member and activist of Henry A. Wallace's Progressive Party. He supported a variety of activists' campaigns during the Vietnam War. He was also a supporter of the Puerto Rican independence movement.

== Legacy and honors ==
Blaut received several awards for distinguished service and scholarship, such as the Association of American Geographers's Distinguished Scholarship Award in 1997.

The Cultural and Political Ecology Study Group of the Association of American Geographers issues the annual James M. Blaut Award in recognition of innovative scholarship in cultural and political ecology. The Socialist and Critical Geography Specialty Group of the AAG also issues a James Blaut Award and has a Memorial Lecture.

In his private life, his hobbies included bird watching.

== Publications ==
- 1987 – The National Question: Decolonising the Theory of Nationalism (London: Zed Books)
- 1992 – Fourteen Ninety-Two: The Debate on Colonialism, Eurocentrism and History (with contributions by S. Amin, R. Dodgshon, A. G. Frank, and R. Palan; Trenton, NJ: AfricaWorld Press)
- 1993 – The Colonizer’s Model of the World: Geographical Diffusionism and Eurocentric History (NY: Guilford Press)
- 2000 – Eight Eurocentric Historians (NY: Guilford Press)

== See also ==
- Andre Gunder Frank
- Samir Amin
- Angus Maddison
- John M. Hobson
