= Providentialism =

Belief that all events on Earth are controlled by God

In Christianity, providentialism is the belief that all events on Earth are controlled by God.

== Belief ==
Providentialism was sometimes viewed by its adherents as differing between national providence and personal providence. Some English and American Christians came to view personal providentialism as backward and superstitious, while continuing to believe in national providentialism. National providentialism was described by the British historian Nicholas Guyatt as encompassing three broader beliefs: God judged nations on the virtues of its leaders, there is a special role for certain nations, and finally that God worked out a master plan through the role of various nations.

Providentialism was frequently featured in discussions of European political and intellectual elites seeking to justify imperialism in the 19th century, on the grounds that the suffering caused by European conquest was justified under the grounds of furthering God's plan and spreading Christianity and civilization to distant nations. In the words of historians, it was an interpretive framework of occurring natural, political and social events at a time when the religious and the secular were not clearly divided.

Providentialism may be understood as the acceptance of the belief that all that happens in the world is for the greater good, since, "God created the social order and appointed each individual in his place within it."

== See also ==
- Occasionalism
- Problem of evil
- Theodicy
