= Eric Jones (economic historian) =

British-Australian economist and historian

Eric Lionel Jones (21 September 1936 – 1 March 2024) was a British-Australian economist and historian, known for his 1981 book The European Miracle.

Jones received a doctorate in economic history from the University of Oxford. From 1970 to 1975, he was professor of economics at Northwestern University in the United States. From 1975 to 1994, he was a professor of economics and economic history at La Trobe University, in Australia. Jones has also had visiting appointments at Yale University, the University of Manchester, Princeton University, the Humboldt University of Berlin, and the Center for Economic Studies at LMU Munich.

As of the early 2000s, he was the Emeritus Professor of Economic Systems and Ideas at La Trobe University, and he held a half-time Professorial Fellow position at the Melbourne Business School of the University of Melbourne in Australia and the part-time Professor of Economics position at the Graduate Center of International Business of the University of Reading in the United Kingdom.

Jones has also acted as a consultant for businesses and international organizations such as the World Bank.

Curated selections of his own publications and some of the many books from his wide ranging, personal library are held by the British Enterprise Heritage Trust, and by the Hayek Library at the Vinson Centre of the University of Buckingham.

Eric Lionel Jones died on 1 March 2024 aged 87.

== Work ==
Eric Jones specialized in economic history, global economics, international affairs and economic systems, particularly in those of the Asian-Pacific region.

Eric Jones is the author of numerous articles and books.

His most notable work is The European Miracle: Environments, Economies and Geopolitics in the History of Europe and Asia book (published in 1981). The work popularized the term European miracle, but some scholars describe his interpretation as 'Eurocentric'. Subsequent editions of the book contained additional introductory discussions of the topic. The book continues to be influential. In 2025, The European Miracle and Beyond: Essays in Honour of Professor E. L. Jones was published by Palgrave Macmillan. In 2026, Polity published The Rise and Fall of China's Economic Miracle: 1950 - 2030 by Jones's friend Kent G. Deng at the London School of Economics.

In Growth Recurring (1988) Jones focused on the states system theory as the decisive factor in the development of the West.

== Bibliography ==
=== Books ===
- Seasons & Prices: the role of the weather in English agricultural history (London: Allen & Unwin, 1964)
- Agriculture and the Industrial Revolution (Basil Blackwell, 1974)
- The European Miracle: Environments, Economies and Geopolitics in the History of Europe and Asia (Cambridge University Press, 1981)
- A Gazetteer of English Urban Fire Disasters 1500-1900 (Geo Books, 1984) [with S. Porter and M. Turner]
- Growth Recurring: Economic Change in World History (Clarendon Press, 1988)
- Coming Full Circle: An Economic History of the Pacific Rim (Westview Press, 1993) [with L.E. Frost and C.M. White]
- The Record of Global Economic Development (Edward Elgar, 2002)
- Cultures Merging: a historical and economic critique of culture (Princeton N.J., 2006)
- Locating the Industrial Revolution: inducement and response (World Scientific, 2010)
- The Fabric of Society and how it creates wealth (Arley Hall Press, 2013) [with Charles F. Foster]
- Revealed Biodiversity: an economic history of the human impact (World Scientific, 2014)
- The Middle Ridgeway and its environment (Wessex Press, 2016) [with P. J. Dillon and illustrated by Anna Dillon].
- Small Earthquake in Wiltshire: Seventeenth-century conflict and its resolution (Hobnob Press, 2017)
- Landed Estates and Rural Inequality in England: From the mid-seventeenth century to the present (Palgrave Macmillan series on economic history, 2018)
- Barriers to Growth: English economic development from the Norman Conquest to Industrialisation (Palgrave Macmillan, 2020)
- A History of Livestock and Wildlife: animal wealth and human usage (Cambridge Scholars Publishing, 2023)

=== Book reviews ===
Date	Review article	Work(s) reviewed
1995	Jones, Eric (October 1995). "Up the organisation". Books. Quadrant. 39 (10): 79–81.	Sampson, Anthony (1995). Company man : the rise and fall of corporate life. HarperCollins.
