= Wen-yuan Qian =

American professor of history

- 錢文源
- Born: April 14, 1936; Shanghai
- Died: August 21, 2003 (aged 67); Jacksonville, Illinois
- Citizenship: American
- Education: University of Michigan (PhD)
- Alma mater: Peking University
- Occupations: Historian of science; sinologist
- Employer(s): Zhejiang University; Blackburn College; MacMurray College
- Known for: The Great Inertia: Scientific Stagnation in Traditional China
- Scientific career
- Thesis: Axiomaticism in Science Development. (1988)

Wen-yuan Qian (Chinese: 錢文源; 14 April 1936 – 21 August 2003) was an American professor of history who taught at Blackburn College and MacMurray College.

== Early life and education ==
Qian was born in Shanghai. He studied physics at Peking University, graduating in 1959.

== Career ==
Qian taught physics at Zhejiang University from 1959 to 1980. During the Cultural Revolution, he was branded an "ideological counter-revolutionary." In 1980, the government of the People's Republic of China sent Qian to the United States to continue his studies while his wife and daughter remained in China. In 1983, he graduated from Northwestern University with a Master of Arts in history. Qian was funded by the W. Clement Stone Foundation to translate several works from Chinese to English.

In 1985, Qian published his most known work, The Great Inertia: Scientific Stagnation in Traditional China. The work was framed as a challenge to Joseph Needham's Science and Civilisation in China, and has been analyzed in relation to it. He believed that political conditions, particularly the imperial examination system, stymied the development of modern science in dynastic China. Qian saw the neglect of formal logic and rigorous proof as a central cause in the failure to develop modern science. At the time, Qian's thesis was considered controversial among sinologists. Victor H. Mair called The Great Inertia an "arching cry of a thoughtful critic from within the Chinese tradition addressed to the enthusiastic advocate from without."

In 1988, Qian graduated from the University of Michigan with a doctorate in history and began teaching history at Blackburn College the same year. From 1992 to 2002, he taught history at MacMurray College. Qian died in 2003 in Jacksonville, Illinois.

== Works ==
- Qian, Wen-yuan (1988). Axiomaticism in Science Development (PhD thesis). hdl:2027.42/161851. OCLC 21402755.
- Qian, Wen-yuan (June 1985). "Science Development: Sino-Western Comparative Insights". Science Communication. 6 (4): 377–405. doi:10.1177/107554708500600404. hdl:2027.42/68479. ISSN 0164-0259. OCLC 4651285863.
- Qian, Wen-yuan (1985). The Great Inertia: Scientific Stagnation in Traditional China. Croom Helm. ISBN 978-0-7099-2104-2. LCCN 84014217. OCLC 10914880. OL 2851872M.
- Qian, Wen-yuan (1982-10-01). "The Great Inertia: An Introduction to a Causal Inquiry into Traditional China's Scientific Stagnation". Comparative Civilizations Review. 9 (9). ISSN 0733-4540. OCLC 8091893947.

== See also ==
- Great Divergence
- History of science and technology in China
