= Linda Weiss =

Australian political scientist

- Born: Linda M. Weiss
- Education: London School of Economics and Political Science
- Occupations: Political scientist, professor, writer

Linda M. Weiss is an Australian political scientist known for her work in comparative and international politics, particularly in economic development and state capacity. She currently serves as Professor Emeritus in Government and International Relations at the University of Sydney.

Weiss earned her PhD from the London School of Economics and Political Science in 1985. She has lectured and held visiting scholar roles in Britain, France, Italy, Denmark, South Korea, and the United States.

Her research focuses on how state power impacts economic development and high technology.

Her early research focused on statecraft in Europe and East Asia, before shifting to discussing the United States. Her works include The Myth of the Powerless State, America Inc.? Innovation and Enterprise in the National Security State, and States and Economic Development (with John M. Hobson).

In 2004, she was elected a Fellow of the Academy of the Social Sciences in Australia. Aarhus University appointed her Honorary Professor of Political Science in 2007. In 2009, the University of Sydney made her Professor Emeritus. In 2020, she was recognised by The Australian as one of Australia's top leaders in their field.

== Selected publications ==
- “Reviving Economic Statecraft for National Security”, American Affairs, Summer 2024, Vol VIII, No.2 (3-21)
- America, Inc.? Innovation and Enterprise in the National Security State, (Cornell University Press, 2014). ISBN 0801479304
- ‘U.S. Technology Procurement in the National Security Innovation System’. In V. Lember, R. Kattel, & T. Kalvet (eds) Public Procurement, Innovation and Policy: International Perspectives, pp. 259-285. (Springer, 2014). ISBN 978-3642402579
- Developmental Politics in Transition: The Neoliberal Era and Beyond. Co-editor and contributor, with Kyung-Sup Chang and Ben Fine. (Springer, 2012). ISBN 9781349333325
- States in the Global Economy: Bringing Domestic Institutions Back In. 2003. Editor & Contributor, (Cambridge University Press, 2003). ISBN 0-521-52538-1
- The Myth of the Powerless State, (Cornell University Press & Polity Press, 1998). ISBN 0-8014-8543-6
- States and Economic Development: A Comparative Historical Analysis, co-authored with John Hobson, (Polity Press, 1995). ISBN 0-7456-1457-4
- Creating Capitalism: Small industry and the Italian State, (Blackwell, 1988). ISBN 0-631-15733-6
