= Joseph Henrich =

American evolutionary biologist (born 1968)

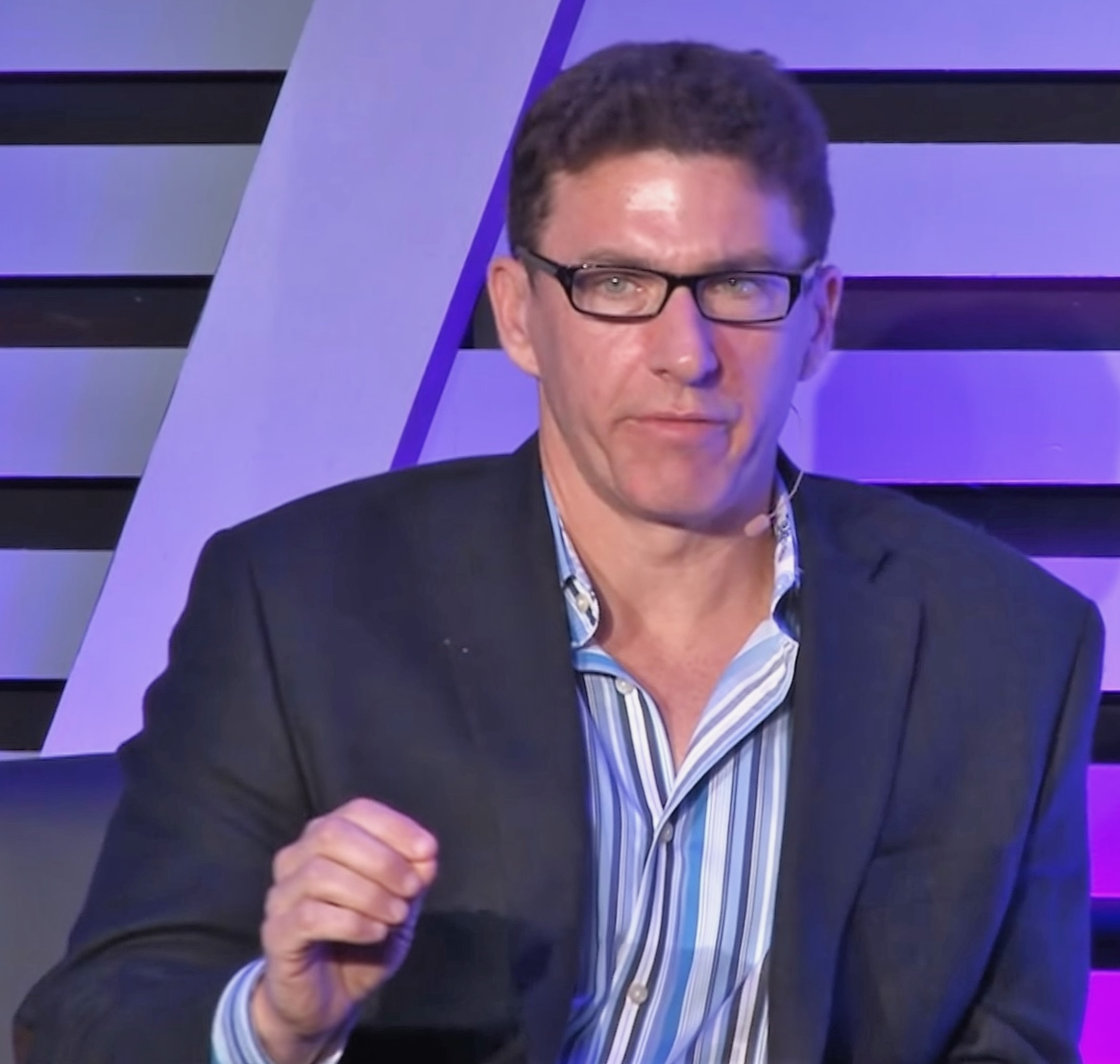
- Henrich in 2016
- Born: 1968 (age 57–58)
- Education: University of Notre Dame (BA, BS); University of California at Los Angeles (MA, PhD)
- Awards: Presidential Early Career Award for Scientists and Engineers (2003)
- Scientific career
- Fields: Anthropology
- Institutions: Emory University; University of British Columbia; Harvard University
- Website: henrich.fas.harvard.edu

Joseph Henrich (born 1968) is an American anthropologist and professor of human evolutionary biology at Harvard University. Before arriving at Harvard, Henrich was a professor of psychology and economics at the University of British Columbia. He is interested in the question of how humans evolved from "being a relatively unremarkable primate a few million years ago to the most successful species on the globe", and how culture shaped our species' genetic evolution.

== Biography ==
Henrich holds bachelor's degrees in anthropology and aerospace engineering from the University of Notre Dame, earned in 1991. From 1991 to 1993, he worked as a Test and Evaluation Systems Engineer for General Electric Aerospace (sold to Martin Marietta in 1993) in Springfield, Virginia. In 1995, he earned a master's degree and, four years later, a doctorate in anthropology from the University of California at Los Angeles.

From 2002 to 2007, Henrich was on the faculty of Emory University in the Department of Anthropology. He became then the Canada Research Chair in Culture, Cognition and Coevolution at the University of British Columbia, where he was a professor in the departments of psychology and economics. In 2015, he was named Professor and Chair of the Department of Human Evolutionary Biology at Harvard University.

Henrich is a recipient of the 2003 Presidential Early Career Award for Scientists and Engineers and the 2022 Hayek Prize.

== Research ==
Henrich's research areas include cultural learning, the evolution of cooperation, social stratification, prestige, technological change, economic decision-making, and the evolution of monogamous marriage and of religion. Early in his career, Henrich led teams of anthropologists and economists in conducting behavioral experiments to test the foundations of game theory in diverse societies around the world. This body of research demonstrated that not only did the predictions of standard game theory, rooted in canonical assumptions of self-interest, fail across a diverse range of human societies, but that they failed in different ways in different places.

Henrich's research on the origins and evolution of religions argues that the beliefs, rituals, and devotions that compose religious traditions have been shaped not only by reliably developing features of human minds but also by competition among groups. Intergroup competition would have favored supernatural beliefs and ritual practices that increased within-group cooperation, harmony, or solidarity. Building on the observation that most human societies have permitted polygamy, Henrich has argued that normative monogamy spread culturally because it reduces male-male competition and thereby promotes success in competition with other societies.

Henrich's research has documented, and sought to explain, psychological differences across populations and around the world. This work argues that the most commonly used participants in psychological and behavioral research are not only a single type of population within a global spectrum, but that they are particularly psychologically peculiar. To raise the consciousness of researchers to this issue, Henrich and his collaborators dubbed the populations most commonly tapped for psychological and behavioral research as "WEIRD", a backronym that stands for "Western, Educated, Industrialized, Rich, and Democratic", and which summarizes the background of most participants in psychological research. Henrich has also written that the psychological peculiarities of "WEIRD" populations are a legacy of the influence of the medieval Catholic Church's ban on cousin marriage. He has argued that the isolated and vulnerable nuclear families created by Church policies were forced to rely on and invest in new kinds of associations for the support they needed and that the growth of these associations created the modern world (including the "peculiar" and individualistic psychology of modern people).

== Selected publications ==
=== Books ===
- Henrich, Joseph; Bowles, Samuel; Boyd, Robert; Camerer, Colin; Fehr, Ernst; Gintis, Herbert (2004). Foundations of Human Sociality: Economic Experiments and Ethnographic Evidence from Fifteen Small-Scale Societies. Oxford New York: Oxford University Press. ISBN 9780199262052.
- Henrich, Joseph; Henrich, Natalie (2007). Why Humans Cooperate: A Cultural and Evolutionary Explanation. Oxford.
- Henrich, Joseph; Ensminger, Jean (2014). Experimenting with Social Norms: Fairness and Punishment in Cross-Cultural Perspective. Russell Sage Foundation Press.
- Henrich, Joseph (2016). The Secret of Our Success: How Culture is Driving Human Evolution, Domesticating our Species, and Making us Smarter. Princeton University Press. ISBN 9780691166858.
- Henrich, Joseph (2020). The WEIRDest People in the World: How the West Became Psychologically Peculiar and Particularly Prosperous. Farrar, Straus and Giroux. ISBN 9780374173227.
