= John M. Hobson =

John Montagu Hobson, FBA (born 27 December 1962) is a political scientist, international relations scholar and academic. Since 2005, he has been Professor of Politics and International Relations at the University of Sheffield.

== Academic career ==
Born in Montreal, Canada, on 27 December 1962, John Montagu Hobson studied political science at the London School of Economics. Having gained his PhD in historical sociology in 1991, with his thesis titled "The tax-seeking state: Protectionism, taxation and state structures in Germany, Russia, Britain and America, 1870-1914" he then relocated to Australia. He taught international relations at La Trobe University in Melbourne between 1992 and 1997. Between 1997 and 2004 he taught international relations and international political economy as a senior lecturer at the University of Sydney. He then returned to the UK in 2004 and since 2005 he has been Professor of Politics and International Relations at the University of Sheffield.

== Honours and awards ==
In 2015, Hobson was elected a Fellow of the British Academy, the United Kingdom's national academy for the humanities and social sciences.

== Selected bibliography ==
=== Books ===
- (Co-authored with Linda Weiss) States and Economic Development: A Comparative Historical Analysis (Polity Press, 1995).
- The Wealth of States: A Comparative Sociology of International Economic and Political Change (Cambridge University Press, 1997).
- The State and International Relations (Cambridge University Press, 2000).
- Historical Sociology of International Relations (Cambridge University Press, 2002).
- The Eastern Origins of Western Civilisation (Cambridge University Press, 2004).
- Everyday Politics of the World Economy (Cambridge University Press, 2007).
- Selected Writings of John A. Hobson, 1932–1938: The Struggle for the International Mind (Editor) (Routledge, 2011).
- The Eurocentric Conception of World Politics: Western International Theory, 1760–2010 (Cambridge University Press, 2012).
- Multicultural Origins of the Global Economy: Beyond the Western-Centric Frontier (Cambridge University Press, 2020).
- Globalizing International Theory: The Problem with Western IR Theory and How to Overcome It (Editor) (Routledge, 2022)

=== Articles ===
- Hobson, John M. (December 1995). "The myth of the nightwatchman state". Quadrant. 39 (12): 65–71.

== See also ==
- Andre Gunder Frank
- Samir Amin
- Angus Maddison
- James Morris Blaut
