= R. Palan =

- Education: University of Madras, India; University of Leicester, United Kingdom; Harvard Business School, United States of America; Federation University, Australia
- Occupations: Social entrepreneur, educator, author
- Spouse: Kamatchi Malayandi
- Website: palan.org

R. Palan is a Malaysian social entrepreneur, educator and author. He serves as the Pro-Chancellor of the University of Cyberjaya. He is the founding director of SMRT Holdings Berhad and the Cyberjaya Education Group, and the founder of Yayasan Palan (The Palan Foundation), a charitable and educational non-profit foundation based in Malaysia.

== Early life and education ==
In 1974, Palan enrolled in the University of Madras, where he pursued a bachelor's degree in Chemistry and then a Master's degree in Arts (Medical and Psychiatric Social Work) at the Madras School of Social Work, graduating in 1979. Subsequently, he completed his MSc (Psychology) with the University of Leicester, United Kingdom. He completed his Advanced Management Programme with the Harvard Business School, USA. He also completed his PhD (Education) with Federation University, Ballarat, Victoria, Australia.

== Career ==
Palan began his career as a training and human resources specialist. He founded the SMR Group, which was listed on the ACE Market of Bursa Malaysia Securities Berhad in 2006. The company's principal services were Education, Human Resources Services and HR Technology. The company was listed on the ACE market of Bursa Malaysia Securities Berhad.

In 2015, Palan co-founded Yayasan Palan (The Palan Foundation), a Malaysian non-profit organization that provides educational scholarships. In the same year, he was appointed Pro-Chancellor of the University of Cyberjaya.

In 2018, following the listing of Cyberjaya Education Group Berhad on the Main Market of Bursa Malaysia Securities Berhad, he became its Group Managing Director.

Palan founded the Cyberjaya Education Group, a private higher education group that includes the University of Cyberjaya and its campuses in Kuching, Kota Kinabalu, and Cyberjaya Central. He previously served on the Board of the University of Malaya and also held positions as Director of UM Holdings Berhad and Chairman of UM Specialist Centre.

== Bibliography ==
- Stuck in the Middle: Why the Toughest Decisions are Never Black and White (2026)
- Essential Business Lessons: The Thought Leaders Playbook (2024)
- Malaysian Indians and Education: Reimagined Development Opportunities (chapter contributor, Routledge, 2023)
- Reflections on an Entrepreneur
- The Global Journey of an Asian
- Competency Management: a practitioner's guide
- Tips on Competency Management
- Performance Management & Measurement: The Asian Context
- The Magic of Making Training Fun!
- Tips on Making Training FUN!
- Tips on High Impact Training
- Creative Training Tips
- Frame Jokes for Trainers
- Frequently asked questions in HRD
- 101 Questions in Training (Co-authored)
- Games Trainers Play (Co-authored)
- Creating Your Own Rainbow
- Tips on Creating Your Own Rainbow
- People Development in Sarawak: The Journey of Taib Mahmud

== Awards ==
Dr. Palan is the recipient of the Darjah Kebesaran Panglima Setia Mahkota (PSM), which carries the honorary title "Tan Sri", the DPMP award, which carries the title "Dato'", and the Johan Bintang Kenyalang (JBK), among other awards from several global organizations.

In 2022, he was awarded an Honorary Doctorate in Entrepreneurship Education by Universiti Kebangsaan Malaysia.
