= Nicholas Guyatt =

British historian, author and lecturer

Nicholas Guyatt (born 1973) is a British historian and author and a professor of North American history at the University of Cambridge in the United Kingdom.

== Career ==
Guyatt studied at Emmanuel College, Cambridge, receiving a BA in English and a MPhil in Political Thought and Intellectual History. He did his doctorate at Princeton University under Daniel T. Rodgers where he received a Ph.D. in history. Guyatt stayed in Princeton to teach after which he moved to a teaching position at Simon Fraser University in Vancouver where he stayed for three years. He returned to the United Kingdom in 2008 as a lecturer in modern history at the University of York. In 2014 he moved to University of Cambridge where he became a fellow at Jesus College and senior lecturer in North American history. He was later promoted to reader and then professor.

Guyatt's specific interests are on the racial and religious history of the United States. He also wrote a popular book, Have a Nice Doomsday (2007), on Christian fundamentalist belief in the Rapture and how it is changing American foreign policy towards Israel.

== Selected bibliography ==
- Providence and the Invention of the United States, 1607-1876 (2007), a historical study of American ideas of providential nationalism.
- Bind Us Apart: How Enlightened Americans Invented Racial Segregation (2016).
- The Hated Cage (2024), about US prisoners in Dartmoor Prison during the War of 1812.
