= Judith Shulevitz =

American journalist

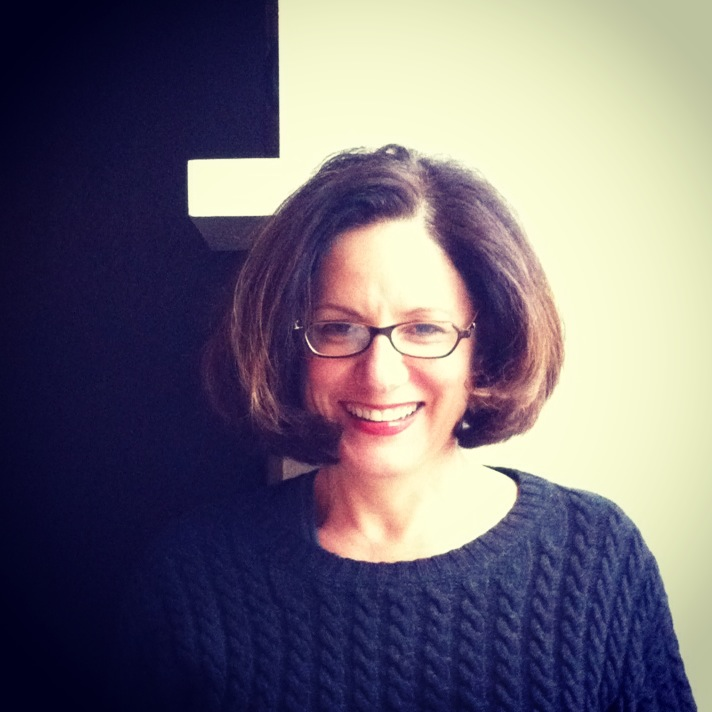
Profile photo of Judith Shulevitz

Judith Anne Shulevitz is an American journalist, editor and culture critic. She has been a columnist for Slate, The New York Times Book Review, and The New Republic. She is a contributing writer for The Atlantic.

== Career ==
Shulevitz got her start editing as co-editor of Lingua Franca with Margaret Talbot. The magazine won a National Magazine Award for General Excellence under their editorship in 1993. Shulevitz later worked as deputy editor and columnist at New York Magazine. She was one of the founding editors of Slate, the culture editor, and a daily columnist for the magazine. Shulevitz wrote the "Close Reader" column for The New York Times Book Review from 2001 through 2003 and wrote and edited for The New Republic from 2011 through 2014. Her essays have also appeared in The New Yorker, The Forward, and many other publications. She is currently a contributing writer for The Atlantic.

Shulevitz published her first book, The Sabbath World: Glimpses of a Different Order of Time (Random House) in 2010. The New Yorker called it "a swift, penetrating book intent on shattering the habits of mindless workaholism," and The Atlantic called it "gorgeously written." Rebecca Goldstein, in The New York Times, wrote, "True to the tradition she loves, [Shulevitz] displays a reassuring double-mindedness toward almost everything except erudition."

== Personal life ==
Shulevitz is Jewish and graduated from Yale University in 1986, having majored in French. She married Nicholas Lemann in 1999. Lemann is a professor at, and was formerly the dean of, the Columbia University Graduate School of Journalism. They have two children.

== Books ==
- The Sabbath World: Glimpses of a Different Order of Time (Random House, March 2010)
