= 49th New York Infantry Regiment =

- Active: September 18, 1861 to June 27, 1865
- Country: United States
- Allegiance: Union
- Branch: Infantry
- Size: 825, (Note: As reported back to Adjutant General Hillhouse upon departure from New York on December 10, 1861) 846
- Nickname(s): 2nd Buffalo Regiment
- Equipment: Model 1842 Springfield Muskets (.69 caliber, smoothbore, on 21 Sep 1861) (Note: On 18 Sep 1861, 846 Harper's Ferry smooth bore Model 1842s, altered from flint to percussion locks. As reported back to Adjutant General on December 31, 1863. This was the number turned in when issued Springfields and Enfields.)
- Engagements: American Civil War: Siege of Yorktown; Battle of Williamsburg; Battle of Beaver Dam Creek; Seven Days Battles; Battle of Garnett's & Golding's Farm; Battle of Savage's Station; Battle of White Oak Swamp; Battle of Malvern Hill; Battle of South Mountain; Battle of Antietam; Battle of Fredericksburg; Battle of Chancellorsville; Battle of Franklin's Crossing; Battle of Gettysburg; Battle of Fairfield; Bristoe Campaign; Mine Run Campaign; Battle of the Wilderness; Battle of Spotsylvania Court House; Battle of Totopotomoy Creek; Battle of Cold Harbor; Siege of Petersburg; Battle of Jerusalem Plank Road; Battle of Fort Stevens; Third Battle of Winchester; Battle of Fisher's Hill; Battle of Cedar Creek; Battle of Fort Stedman; Appomattox Campaign; Third Battle of Petersburg; Battle of Sailor's Creek; Battle of Appomattox Court House

Commanders
- Colonel: Daniel D. Bidwell,
- Colonel: Erastus D. Holt
- Colonel: George H. Selkirk
- Lieutenant Colonel: William C. Alberger
- Lieutenant Colonel: George W. Johnson

Insignia
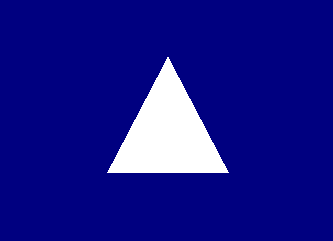
- IV Corps (2nd Division) badge

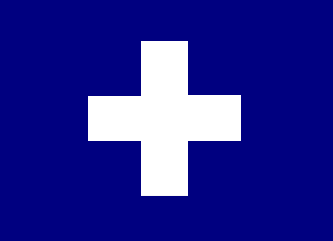
- VI Corps (2nd Division) badge

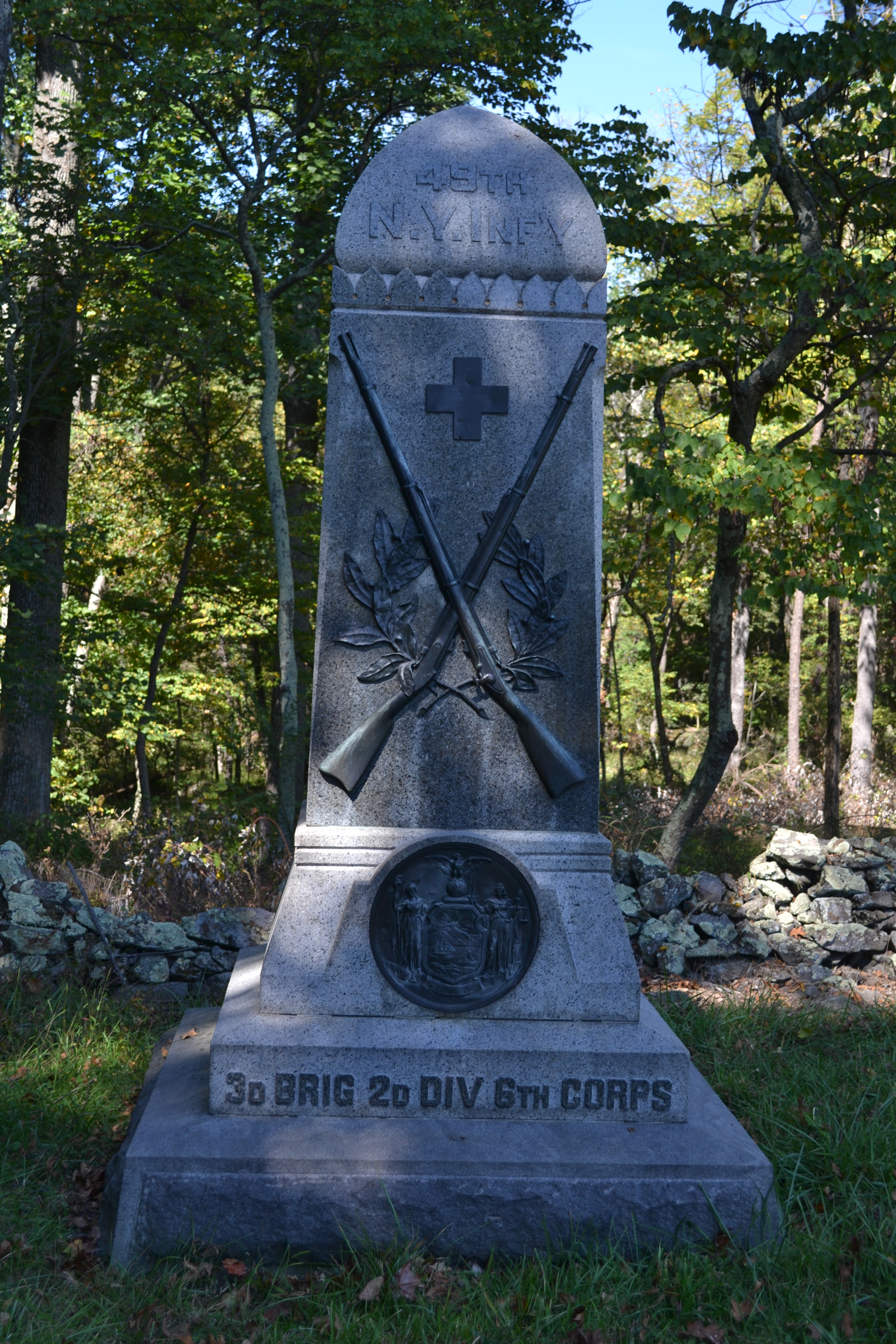
Monument to the 49th New York Volunteer Infantry at Gettysburg

The 49th New York Infantry Regiment was an infantry regiment in the Union Army during the American Civil War.

== Service ==
The 49th New York Infantry was organized at Buffalo, New York and mustered in for three years service on September 18, 1861, under the command of Colonel Daniel D. Bidwell, an attorney from Buffalo.

The regiment was attached to Stevens' 3rd Brigade, W. F. Smith's Division, Army of the Potomac, to March 1862. 3rd Brigade, 2nd Division, IV Corps, Army of the Potomac, to May 1862. 3rd Brigade, 2nd Division, VI Corps, Army of the Potomac, and Army of the Shenandoah, to June 1865.

The 49th New York Infantry mustered out of service on June 27, 1865.

== Affiliations, battle honors, detailed service, and casualties ==
=== Organizational affiliation ===
Attached to:

- BGEN Isaac Ingalls Stevens' 3rd Brigade, BGEN "Baldy" Smith's Division, Army of the Potomac (AoP), to March, 1862
- 3rd Brigade' 2nd Division, IV Corps, AoP, to May, 1862.
- 3rd Brigade' 2nd Division, IV Corps, AoP, and Army of the Shenandoah (AoS) to June, 1865.

=== List of battles ===
The official list of battles in which the regiment bore a part:

- Siege of Yorktown
- Battle of Williamsburg
- Battle of Beaver Dam Creek
- Seven Days Battles
- Battle of Garnett's & Golding's Farm
- Battle of Savage's Station
- Battle of White Oak Swamp
- Battle of Malvern Hill
- Battle of South Mountain
- Battle of Antietam
- Battle of Fredericksburg
- Battle of Chancellorsville
- Battle of Franklin's Crossing
- Battle of Gettysburg
- Battle of Fairfield
- Bristoe Campaign
- Mine Run Campaign
- Battle of the Wilderness
- Battle of Spotsylvania Court House
- Battle of Totopotomoy Creek
- Battle of Cold Harbor
- Siege of Petersburg
- Battle of Jerusalem Plank Road
- Battle of Fort Stevens
- Third Battle of Winchester
- Battle of Fisher's Hill
- Battle of Cedar Creek
- Battle of Fort Stedman
- Appomattox Campaign
- Third Battle of Petersburg
- Battle of Sailor's Creek
- Battle of Appomattox Court House

=== Detailed service ===
==== 1861 ====
- Left New York for Washington, D.C., September 20, 1861.
- Action at Dranesville, Va., December 20, 1861
- Moved to Camp near Lewinsville, defenses of Washington. D.C., until March 1862.

==== 1862 ====
- Advance on Manassas, Va., March 10–15, 1862.
- Ordered to the Peninsula March 22.
- Action at Lee's Mills April 5.
- Siege of Yorktown April 5-May 4.
- Lee's Mills April 16.
- Battle of Williamsburg May 5.
- Mechanicsville May 23–24.
- Seven Days Battles before Richmond June 25-July 1.
- Garnett's Farm June 27.
- Garnett's and Golding's Farm June 28.
- Savage's Station June 29.
- White Oak Swamp June 30.
- Malvern Hill July 1.
- At Harrison's Landing until August 16.
- Movement to Fort Monroe, then to Centreville August 16–27.
- In works at Centreville August 28–31, and cover Pope's retreat to Fairfax Court House September 1.
- Maryland Campaign September 6–22.
- Battle of Crampton's Pass, South Mountain September 14.
- Battle of Antietam September 16–17.
- Duty in Maryland until October 29.
- Movement to Falmouth, Va., October 29-November 19.
- Battle of Fredericksburg December 12–15.
- Duty at Falmouth, Va., until April 1863.

==== 1863 ====
- "Mud March" January 20–24, 1863.
- At Falmouth until April 27.
- Chancellorsville Campaign April 27-May 6.
- Operations about Franklin's Crossing April 29-May 2.
- Battle of Maryes Heights, Fredericksburg, May 3.
- Salem Heights May 3–4.
- Banks' Ford May 4.
- Deep Run Ravine June 5–13.
- Battle of Gettysburg July 2–4.
- Pursuit of Lee July 5–24.
- Fairfield, Pa., July 7.
- Duty on line of the Rappahannock until October.
- Bristoe Campaign October 9–22.
- Advance to line of the Rappahannock November 7–8.
- Rappahannock Station November 7.
- Mine Run Campaign November 26-December 2.
- Duty near Brandy Station until May 1864.

==== 1864 ====
- Campaign from the Rapidan to the James May 3-June 15.
- Battle of the Wilderness May 5–7.
- Spotsylvania May 8–12.
- Spotsylvania Court House May 12–21.
- Assault on the Salient or "Bloody Angle" May 12.
- North Anna River May 23–26.
- On line of the Pamunkey May 26–28.
- Totopotomoy May 28–31. Cold Harbor June 1–12.
- Before Petersburg June 17–18.
- Siege of Petersburg June 17-July 9.
- Jerusalem Plank Road June 22–23.
- Moved to Washington, D.C., July 9–11.
- Repulse of Early's attack on Fort Stevens and the northern defenses of Washington July 11–12.
- Pursuit of Early July 14–22.
- Sheridan's Shenandoah Valley Campaign August 7-November 28.
- Near Charlestown August 21–22.
- Gilbert's Ford, Opequan Creek, September 13.
- Battle of Winchester September 19.
- Fisher's Hill September 22.
- Battle of Cedar Creek October 19.
- Duty in the Shenandoah Valley until December.
- Moved to Washington, then to Petersburg December 13–16.
- Siege of Petersburg December 16, 1864 to April 2, 1865..

==== 1865 ====
- Fort Fisher, Petersburg, March 25, 1865.
- Appomattox Campaign March 28-April 9.
- Assault on and fall of Petersburg April 2.
- Pursuit of Lee April 3–9. Sailor's Creek April 6.
- Appomattox Court House April 9.
- Surrender of Lee and his army.
- March to Danville, Va., April 23–27.
- Duty there until May 18.
- Moved to Richmond, then to Washington May 18-June 2.
- Corps Review June 8.

== Casualties ==
The regiment lost a total of 320 men during service; 15 officers and 126 enlisted men killed or mortally wounded, 5 officers and 174 enlisted men died of disease. The regiment's bloodiest battles were Antietam, 2nd Fredericksburg, The Wilderness, and Spotsylvania Court House.

Of note, the 49th New York Volunteer Infantry Regiment, commanded by COL Bidwell, brought 414 men into action, but lost only two enlisted men wounded. This was because Neill's 3rd Brigade of VI Corps was one of the last to reach the battlefield on Thursday, July 2, and was held in reserve on the Baltimore Pike at Rock Creek. On Friday, the third day of the battle, the brigade deployed to the north of the Pike on the east side of Rock Creek to push back Confederate skirmishers that were threatening the army's main supply and communications route. It advanced to where its monument is now located, taking light casualties.

== Armament ==
Soldiers in the 49th were armed with 825 Model 1842 Muskets. By the end of the first full year of hard campaigning, the regimented returned 846 Model 1842 smoothbore percussion muskets to the Adjutant General. The regiment reported the following survey result to U.S. War Department:

- A — 29 Springfield Rifled Muskets, model 1855, 1861, National Armory (NA) (Note: In government records, National Armory refers to one of three United States Armory and Arsenals, the Springfield Armory, the Harpers Ferry Armory, and the Rock Island Arsenal. Rifle-muskets, muskets, and rifles were manufactured in Springfield and Harper's Ferry before the war. When the Rebels destroyed the Harpers Ferry Armory early in the American Civil War and stole the machinery for the Richmond Aresenal, the Springfield Armory was briefly the only government manufacturer of arms, until the Rock Island Arsenal was established in 1862. During this time production ramped up to unprecedented levels ever seen in American manufacturing up until that time, with only 9,601 rifles manufactured in 1860, rising to a peak of 276,200 by 1864. These advancements would not only give the Union a decisive technological advantage over the Confederacy during the war but served as a precursor to the mass production manufacturing that contributed to the post-war Second Industrial Revolution and 20th century machine manufacturing capabilities. American historian Merritt Roe Smith has drawn comparisons between the early assembly machining of the Springfield rifles and the later production of the Ford Model T, with the latter having considerably more parts, but producing a similar numbers of units in the earliest years of the 1913–1915 automobile assembly line, indirectly due to mass production manufacturing advancements pioneered by the armory 50 years earlier.) and contract, (.58 Cal.)
- B — 34 Springfield Rifled Muskets, model 1855, 1861, NA and contract, (.58 Cal.); 2 Enfield Rifled Muskets. (Note: When the American arms company, Robbins & Lawrence’s went bankrupt after the Crimean War ended, the New York firm of Fox, Henderson & Company, a creditor, agreed to accept 5,600 Pattern 1853 guns to be assembled by Vermont Arms as payment for their credit interest in the now bankrupt company. In 1858 Vermont Arms also failed, and the remaining inventory and assets were sold at auction. The State of New York purchased the completed arms and stored them in their armories. New York merchants like Fox, Henderson & Company also sold many of the completed arms to southern states during 1860 and early 1861. The states had purchased the arms in preparation for the Civil War that they were sure was about to happen. Finally waking up to the arms purchases going on under their noses, in New York, on January 21, 1861, the NYPD intercepted and impounded 38 cases of rifled muskets that were being headed to Alabama and Georgia. The Enfields in New Yorks inventory were mostly American-made like the Windsors and license-built in Liege, Belgium.) (.58 and .577 Cal.)
- C — 35 Springfield Rifled Muskets, model 1855, 1861, NA and contract, (.58 Cal.); 2 Enfield Rifled Muskets. (.58 and .577 Cal.)
- D — 32 Springfield Rifled Muskets, model 1855, 1861, NA and contract, (.58 Cal.);
- F — 18 Springfield Rifled Muskets, model 1855, 1861, NA and contract, (.58 Cal.); 14 Enfield Rifled Muskets. (.58 and .577 Cal.)
- G — 25 Springfield Rifled Muskets, model 1855, 1861, NA and contract, (.58 Cal.); 30 Enfield Rifled Muskets. (.58 and .577 Cal.)
- H — 33 Springfield Rifled Muskets, model 1855, 1861, NA and contract, (.58 Cal.); 3 Enfield Rifled Muskets. (.58 and .577 Cal.)
- I — 19 Springfield Rifled Muskets, model 1855, 1861, NA and contract, (.58 Cal.); 9 Enfield Rifled Muskets. (.58 and .577 Cal.)
- K — 37 Springfield Rifled Muskets, model 1855, 1861, NA and contract, (.58 Cal.); 3 Enfield Rifled Muskets. (.58 and .577 Cal.)

It appears they continued with a mix of Springfields and Enfields. The 57 Enfields reported at Fredericksburg were drawn from New York Armories.

=== Rifle-muskets ===
Issued weapons

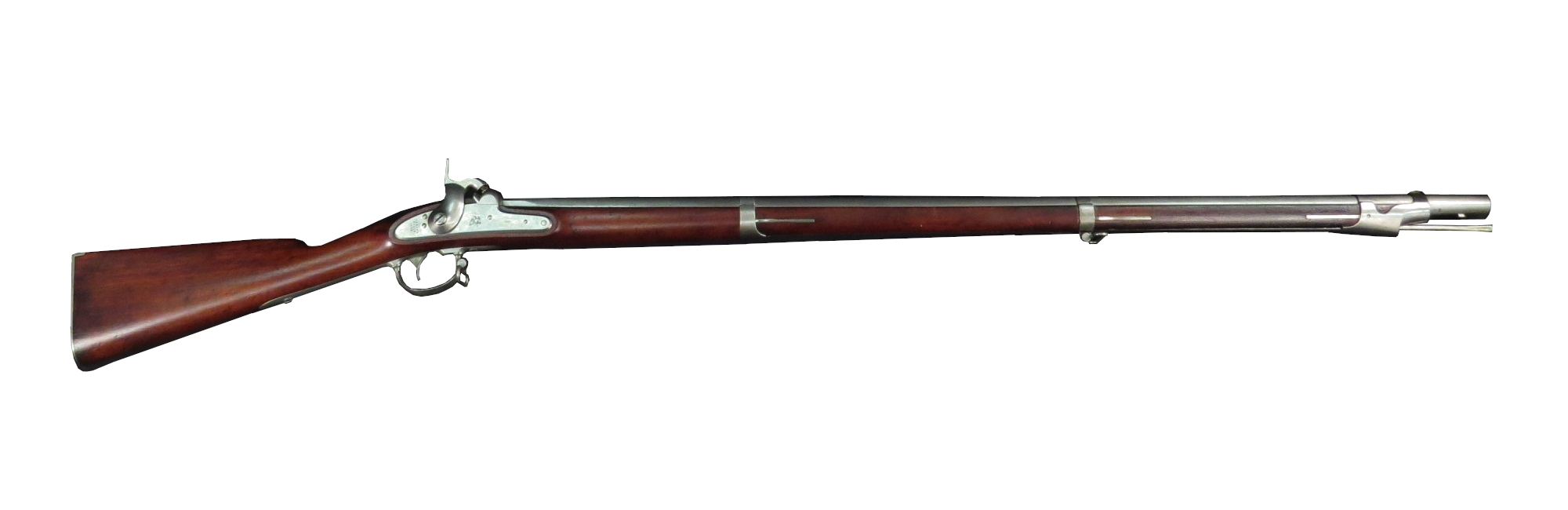
Model 1842 smoothbore musket

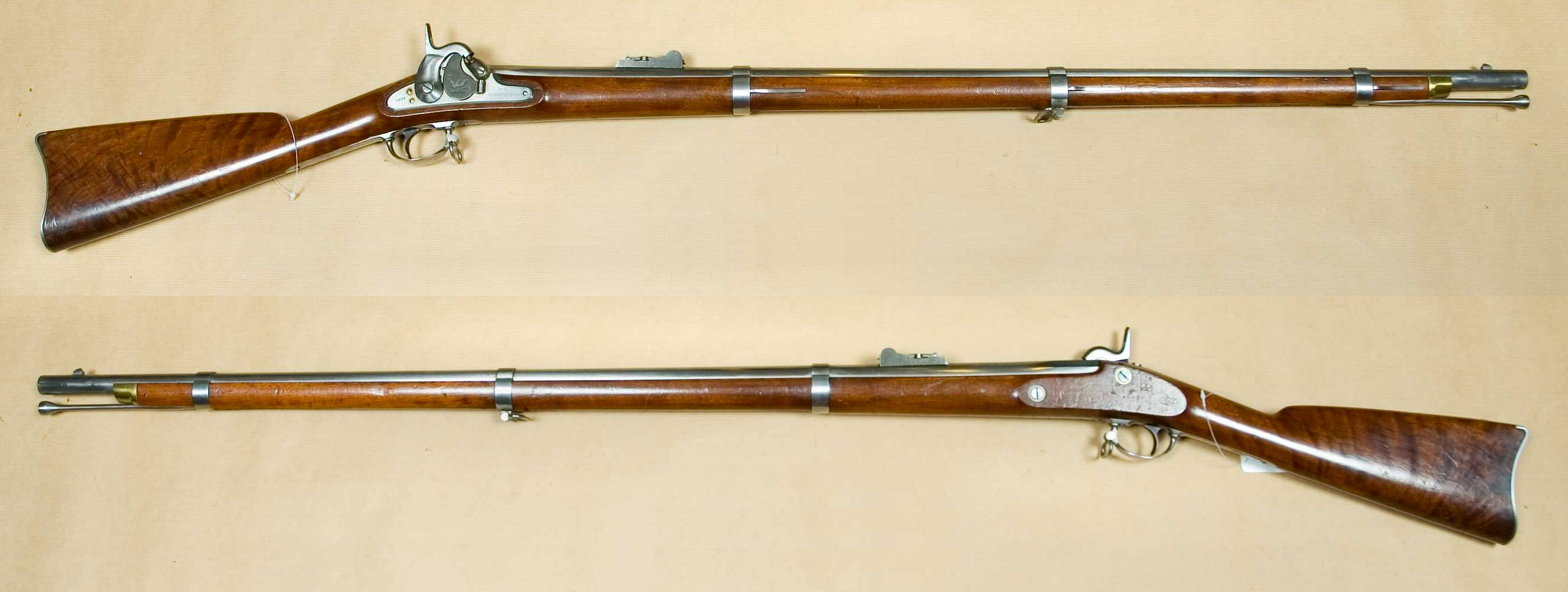
Springfield Model 1855

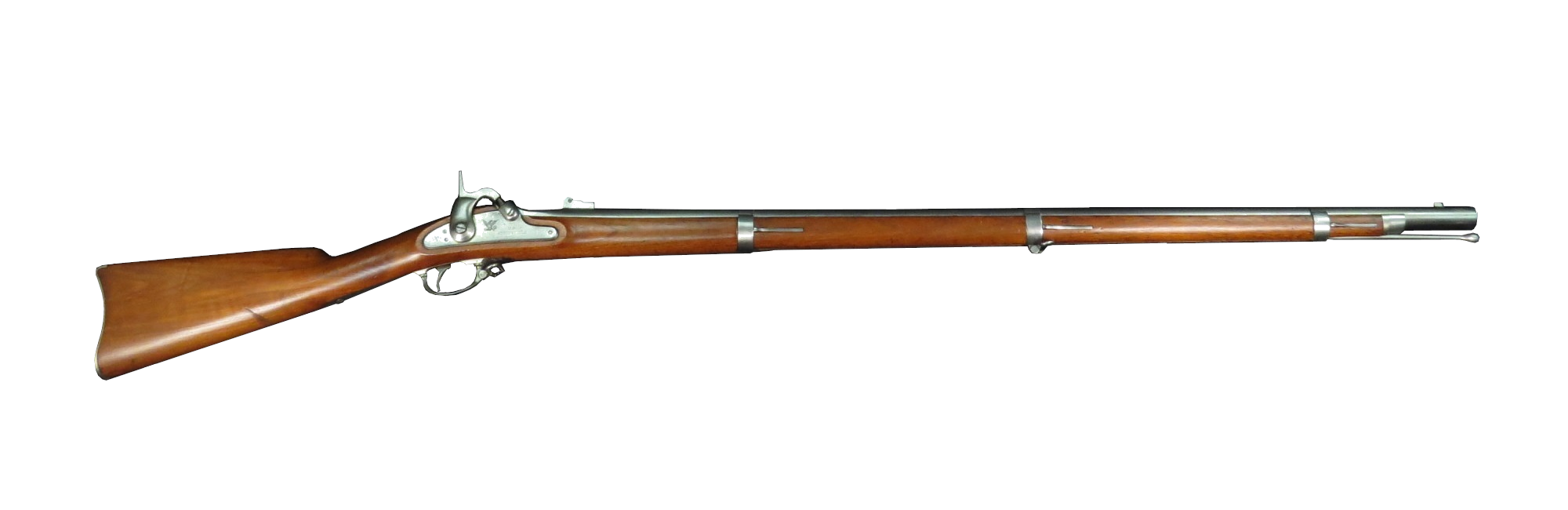
Springfield Model 1861

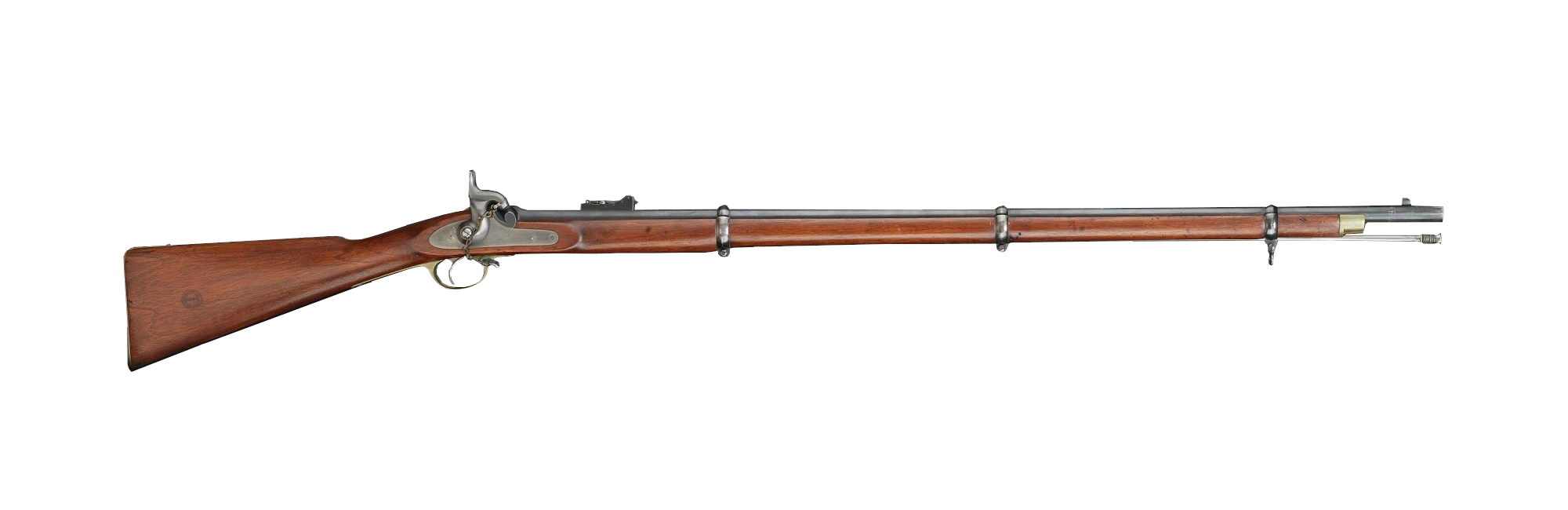
Pattern 1853 Enfield rifle-musket

== Uniform ==
The men of the regiment were initially issued the standard gray militia uniform. In early 1862, they received standard blue sack coats, sky blue infantry trousers, and the sky blue infantry winter overcoat.

== Commanders ==
- Colonel Daniel D. Bidwell - promoted to brigadier general August 11, 1864
- Colonel Erastus D. Holt - commanded at the Battle of Fort Stevens while at the rank of captain after Ltc Johnson was mortally wounded; killed in action at the Third Battle of Petersburg
- Colonel George H. Selkirk
- Lieutenant Colonel William C. Alberger - commanded at the Battle of Antietam until wounded in action
- Lieutenant Colonel George W. Johnson - commanded at the Battle of Antietam while at the rank of major after Ltc Alberger was wounded; commanded at the Battles of the Wilderness and Spotsylvania Court House; mortally wounded in action at the Battle of Fort Stevens

== Notable members ==
- 2nd Lieutenant John P. McVeane, Company D - Medal of Honor recipient for action at the Battle of Chancellorsville

== See also ==
- List of New York Civil War regiments
- New York in the Civil War
