= 43rd New York Infantry Regiment =

- Active: September 21, 1861, to June 27, 1865
- Country: United States
- Allegiance: Union
- Branch: Infantry
- Nickname(s): Albany And Yates' Rifles; Vinton Rifles
- Engagements: Lee's Mill: Williamsburg; Seven Days Battles; Antietam; Chancellorsville; Deep Run; Gettysburg; Rappahannock Station; Locust Grove; Auburn; Mine Run; Wilderness; Spotsylvania Courthouse; Cedar Creek; Cold Harbor; Petersburg; Sailor's Creek; Appomattox

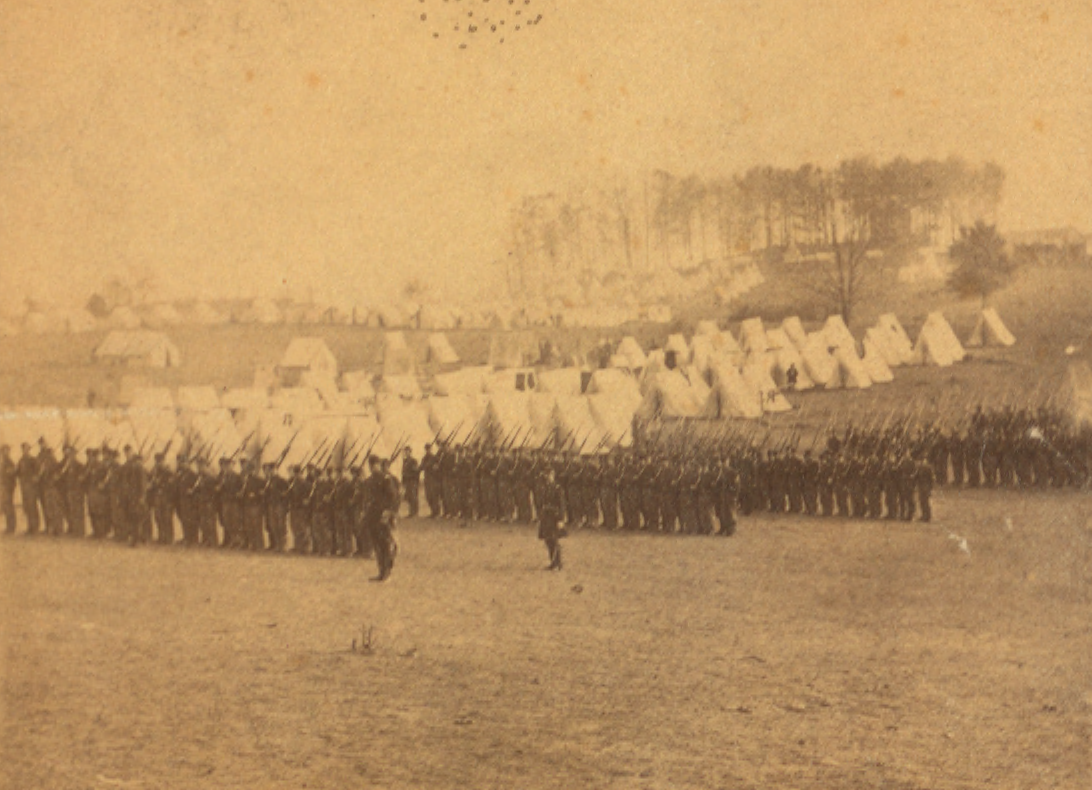
43rd New York Volunteer Infantry Regiment at Camp Griffin, Virginia

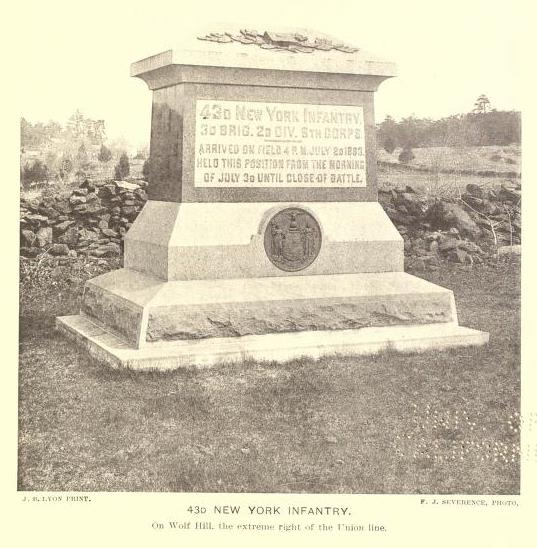
43rd New York Infantry Monument, Gettysburg Battlefield.

The 43rd New York Infantry Regiment was an infantry regiment of the Union Army during the American Civil War. The 43rd New York was mustered in on September 21, 1861, and mustered out June 27, 1865. It was recruited largely in the Albany and New York City areas, fought in many engagements and took heavy casualties.

== Recruiting areas ==
The 43rd New York Infantry was recruited in the following areas:

- A Company: Albany
- B Company: Albany
- C Company: Albany and Oneonta
- D Company:Albany
- E Company: Canajoharie
- F Company: Hudson Falls
- G Company: Schenectady
- H Company: New York City
- I Company: New York City
- K Company: Cooperstown

== Commanders ==
- Colonel Francis Laurens Vinton (Note: Promoted to Brigadier General.)
- Colonel Benjamin F. Baker (Note: Resigned.)
- Colonel Charles A. Milliken

== Battle record ==
1. Lee's Mill
2. Williamsburg
3. Seven Days Battles (After the Seven Days Battles, the regiment was consolidated into one battalion)
4. Antietam
5. Chancellorsville
6. Deep Run
7. Gettysburg
8. Rappahannock Station
9. Locust Grove
10. Auburn
11. Mine Run
12. Wilderness
13. Spotsylvania Courthouse
14. Cedar Creek
15. Cold Harbor
16. Petersburg
17. Sailor's Creek
18. Appomattox

== Casualties ==
The 43rd NY suffered 693 casualties: 117 officers and men killed or mortally wounded, 332 wounded and recovered, and 244 missing or captured.

== See also ==
- List of New York Civil War regiments
