= John P. McVeane =

American Civil War soldier

- Born: 1842; Toronto, Canada West
- Died: May 10, 1864 (aged 21–22); Virginia
- Burial place: Forest Lawn Cemetery, Buffalo, New York
- Military career
- Allegiance: United States of America
- Branch: United States Army; Union Army
- Service years: 1861–1864
- Rank: 2nd Lieutenant
- Units: (New York (state)) Company D, 49th New York Infantry
- Conflicts: Battle of Chancellorsville; American Civil War
- Awards: Medal of Honor

John P. McVeane (1842 – May 10, 1864) was an American soldier who fought in the American Civil War. McVeane received his country's highest award for bravery during combat, the Medal of Honor. McVeane's medal was won for capturing the flag from a Confederate Color bearer at Fredericksburg Heights. He was posthumously honored with the award on September 21, 1870.

McVeane was born in Toronto, Ontario, Canada. He joined the 49th New York Volunteer Infantry from Buffalo, New York in August 1861. He was commissioned as a 2nd Lieutenant in October 1863, and was mortally wounded during the Battle of the Wilderness. McVeane was one of 30 Canadians to win the Medal of Honor.

== Medal of Honor citation ==
The President of the United States of America, in the name of Congress, takes pride in presenting the Medal of Honor (Posthumously) to Corporal John P. McVeane, United States Army, for extraordinary heroism on 4 May 1863, while serving with Company D, 49th New York Infantry, in action at Fredericksburg Heights, Virginia. Corporal McVeane shot a Confederate Color Bearer and seized the flag; also approached, alone, a barn between the lines and demanded and received the surrender of a number of the enemy therein.

== See also ==
- List of American Civil War Medal of Honor recipients: M–P
