= The Wealth and Poverty of Nations =

1998 book by David Landes

- Cover of first U.S. edition
- Author: David S. Landes
- Language: English
- Subject: Economic history
- Publisher: Little, Brown
- Publication date: 1998
- Publication place: United States
- ISBN: 9780316908672
- OCLC: 1158368656

The Wealth and Poverty of Nations: Why Some Are So Rich and Some So Poor is a 1998 book by historian and economist David Landes. He attempted to explain why some countries and regions experienced near miraculous periods of explosive growth while the rest of the world stagnated. The book compared the long-term economic histories of different regions, specifically Europe, United States, Japan, China, the Arab world, and Latin America. In addition to analyzing economic and cliometric figures, he credited intangible assets, such as culture and enterprise, to explain economic success or failure.

Landes was Emeritus Professor of Economics and Coolidge Professor of History at Harvard University.

== Content ==
In The Wealth and Poverty of Nations, Landes revives, at least in part, several theories he believes have been incorrectly discarded by academics over the previous forty years:

- The 'cultural thesis' or Protestant work ethic of Max Weber, whereby the values imposed by the Protestant religion on its adherents would have pushed them to value hard work, timeliness, enterprise, free market and free-thinking to a much greater extent than for their Catholic brethren, which would explain the great success of northern Protestant regions such as the Netherlands, Great Britain, Denmark and parts of Germany as compared to southern Catholic nations such as Spain and France.
- The 'hydraulic thesis' in Karl A. Wittfogel's Oriental Despotism: A Comparative Study of Total Power, in which despots would control the use of water in order to submit the population to its will.
- The 'climate thesis' that posits that tropical climes are, ceteris paribus, poor candidates for development.
- Many of the theories of Adam Smith, whose Wealth of Nations is borrowed from for the title.

He also spends a good deal of effort to debunk claims that the Asian miracle did not happen, was not significant, or was financed by European colonialism, and he draws a correlation between the economic level of a country and the way it treats its women.

In short, he argues that the vast economic growth of the Industrial Revolution was no accident but instead resulted from several qualities of Europe, including its climate, political competition, economic freedom and attitude towards science and religion, more specifically from certain countries in Western Europe, primarily England.

== Criticism and response ==
Critics have charged Landes with eurocentrism in his analysis, a charge which Landes himself does not deny; in fact, he embraces it explicitly, arguing that an explanation for an economic miracle that happened originally only in Europe (though he deals with the later "Asian miracle" in Wealth and Poverty) must of necessity be a Eurocentric analysis, thus siding at least at some level with thinkers such as Bernard Lewis. Following Daniel Bell, knowledge is the necessary link between "The European miracle" and the American post-industrial society.

Landes and Andre Gunder Frank, author of ReOrient: Global Economy in the Asian Age (ISBN 0520214749), are noted for having come to very different conclusions about the long-term significance of economic developments in "the West" during the modern era and publicly debated their findings in 1998 at Northeastern University.

Additionally, an alternate theory relies on literacy and the gap between Protestants and Catholics as an explanation for the difference in economic results.

The economist Paul Krugman remarked in "The Trouble with History", an article published on his MIT-hosted blog, that the book, while containing an enormous amount of information, offered very few ideas. "What [does]... Landes actually believe? And the answer, which seems to me to be damning, is that I am not sure. [...] So I am still waiting for a book that helps me understand what really happened in this utterly perplexing century.... Whoever writes that book will have to be a person unafraid of offering theories as well as facts, and therefore of saying things that might turn out to be wrong."

== See also ==
- Great Divergence
- Guns, Germs, and Steel
- The Rise and Fall of the Great Powers
- The Civilizing Process
- The European Miracle
- The Rise of the West: A History of the Human Community
- The Clash of Civilizations
- A Farewell to Alms
- Civilization: The West and the Rest
