= The Unbound Prometheus =

1969 book by David S. Landes

- Title page for The Unbound Prometheus: Technological Change and Industrial Development in Western Europe from 1750 to the Present (1969)
- Author: David Landes
- Subject: Economic history
- Publisher: Cambridge University Press
- Publication date: 1969
- ISBN: 052107200X

The Unbound Prometheus: Technological Change and Industrial Development in Western Europe from 1750 to the Present is an economic history book by David S. Landes, first published in 1969 by Cambridge University Press. Its focus is on the Industrial Revolution in England and its spread to the rest of Western Europe. Its principal contribution is the argument in favor of the Second Industrial Revolution.

The Unbound Prometheus first appeared in the Cambridge Economic History of Europe, Volume VI in 1965, but it was expanded for the 1969 edition. A second edition was published in 2003, which included an additional preface and afterward. As of 2008, the book had been reprinted four times.

The book deals with innovations and inventions that brought about modernization and technological developments in Western Europe beginning in the 18th century. It explores why Europe was the first to industrialize and argues that industrialization is just one part of a larger process of modernization during which a culture significantly changes its social order, institutional order, attitudes, values, and government in order to promote and accommodate further change. In addition, the book also discusses the economic boom that has occurred since the industrial revolution began and argues that only through continued industrialization can the world sustain itself economically in the coming years.

The Unbound Prometheus is considered a classic text in the field of economic history.
