= Revolution in Time =

Book by David Landes

Revolution in Time: Clocks and the Making of the Modern World
- Author: David S. Landes
- Publication date: 1983
- ISBN: 0-674-76802-7

Revolution in Time: Clocks and the Making of the Modern World, is an influential history book by David S. Landes. Its focus is on the history of the measure of time and its interdependence with the evolution of the various civilisations over the centuries.

The book was first published in 1983 by Belknap Press of the Harvard University Press (hardback ISBN 0-674-76800-0, paperback ISBN 0-674-76802-7) and has been expanded in its second edition, published in 2000: ISBN 0-674-00282-2, copyright 1983, 2000 by the President and Fellows of Harvard College. The book deals with innovations and inventions that brought about modernization and technological developments in timekeeping in the whole world. It is considered to be one of the preeminent works on the history of horology.
