= David Landes =

American economist and historian

David S. Landes
- Born: April 29, 1924; New York City
- Died: August 17, 2013 (aged 89); Haverford, Pennsylvania

Academic background
- Education: Harvard University; City College of New York

Academic work
- Discipline: Economic History
- Institutions: Harvard University
- Awards: Docteur honoris causa, Université de Lille, France, 1973; Docteur ès Sciences économiques et sociales, honoris causa, Université de Genève, Switzerland, 1990; Doctor, honoris causa, University of Ancona, 1990; Docteur ès Sciences économiques, Université de Neuchâtel, 1991; Docteur honoris causa, Eidgenössische Technische Hochschule, Zurich, 1993; Doctor honoris causa, Bard College, 1999; Professor honoris causa, Ecole des Hautes Etudes Commerciales, Jouy-en-Josas, 2000

David Saul Landes (April 29, 1924 – August 17, 2013) was a professor of economics and of history at Harvard University. He is the author of Bankers and Pashas, Revolution in Time, The Unbound Prometheus, The Wealth and Poverty of Nations, and Dynasties. Such works have received both praise for detailed retelling of economic history, as well as scorn on charges of Eurocentrism, a charge he openly embraced, arguing that an explanation for an economic miracle that happened originally only in Europe must, by necessity, be a Eurocentric analysis.

== Career ==
Landes earned a Ph.D. from Harvard University in 1953, after a B.A. from City College of New York in 1942. While he waited his call-up to serve in World War II, Landes studied cryptanalysis. He was assigned to the Signal Corps, where he worked on deciphering Japanese coded messages.

Historian Niall Ferguson called him one of his "most revered mentors".

Landes was a member of the American Academy of Arts and Sciences, the United States National Academy of Sciences, and the American Philosophical Society.

His son Richard Landes is a historian and author.

== Works ==
- Landes, David S. (2007). Dynasties: Fortunes and Misfortunes of the World's Great Family Businesses: Why Some Are So Rich and Some So Poor. New York: Viking. ISBN 978-0-670-03338-6.
- Landes, David S. (1998). The Wealth and Poverty of Nations: Why Some Are So Rich and Some So Poor. New York: W.W. Norton. ISBN 0-393-04017-8.
- Landes, David S. (1983). Revolution in Time. Cambridge, Massachusetts: Harvard University Press. ISBN 0-674-00282-2.
- Landes, David. S. (1969). The Unbound Prometheus: Technological Change and Industrial Development in Western Europe from 1750 to the Present. Cambridge, New York: Press Syndicate of the University of Cambridge. ISBN 0-521-09418-6.
- Landes, David S., Bankers and Pashas: International Finance and Economic Imperialism in Egypt (1958)

== See also ==
- Environmental determinism
