= Battle of Franklin's Crossing =

Battle of the American Civil War

- Part of the American Civil War
Date	June 5–6, 1863
Location	Spotsylvania County / Stafford County, near Fredericksburg, Virginia 38°16′58″N 77°26′35″W
Result	Confederate Victory

Belligerents
Confederate States	United States

Commanders and leaders
General A.P. Hill	General John Sedgwick

Strength
Corps	Corps

Casualties and losses
41 (6 dead, 35 captured)	57 (9 dead)

The Battle of Franklin's Crossing, also known as Deep Run, took place near Fredericksburg, Virginia on June 5, 1863. Union forces under General John Sedgwick skirmished with Confederate troops under General A. P. Hill during a reconnaissance to determine the movements and location of General Robert E. Lee's Army of Northern Virginia. Confederate forces repulsed the Union probe. The small fight was the first action in the Gettysburg campaign.

== Background ==
On June 3, Robert E. Lee decided to begin his second invasion of Northern soil and accordingly ordered his army to withdraw the lines around Fredericksburg and move into the Shenandoah Valley. To cover the withdrawal, Lee left A. P. Hill's 3rd Corps, with orders to remain along the lines until the Army was safely away.

Word of Lee's movements reached Union general Joseph Hooker almost immediately. To determine the validity of the various reports he was receiving, at 7 am on June 5, Major General Daniel Butterfield ordered the 6th Corps under John Sedgwick to prepare to lay bridges across the Rappahannock River at Franklin's Crossing, the Army of the Potomac's third attempt to do so within six months.

== The battle ==
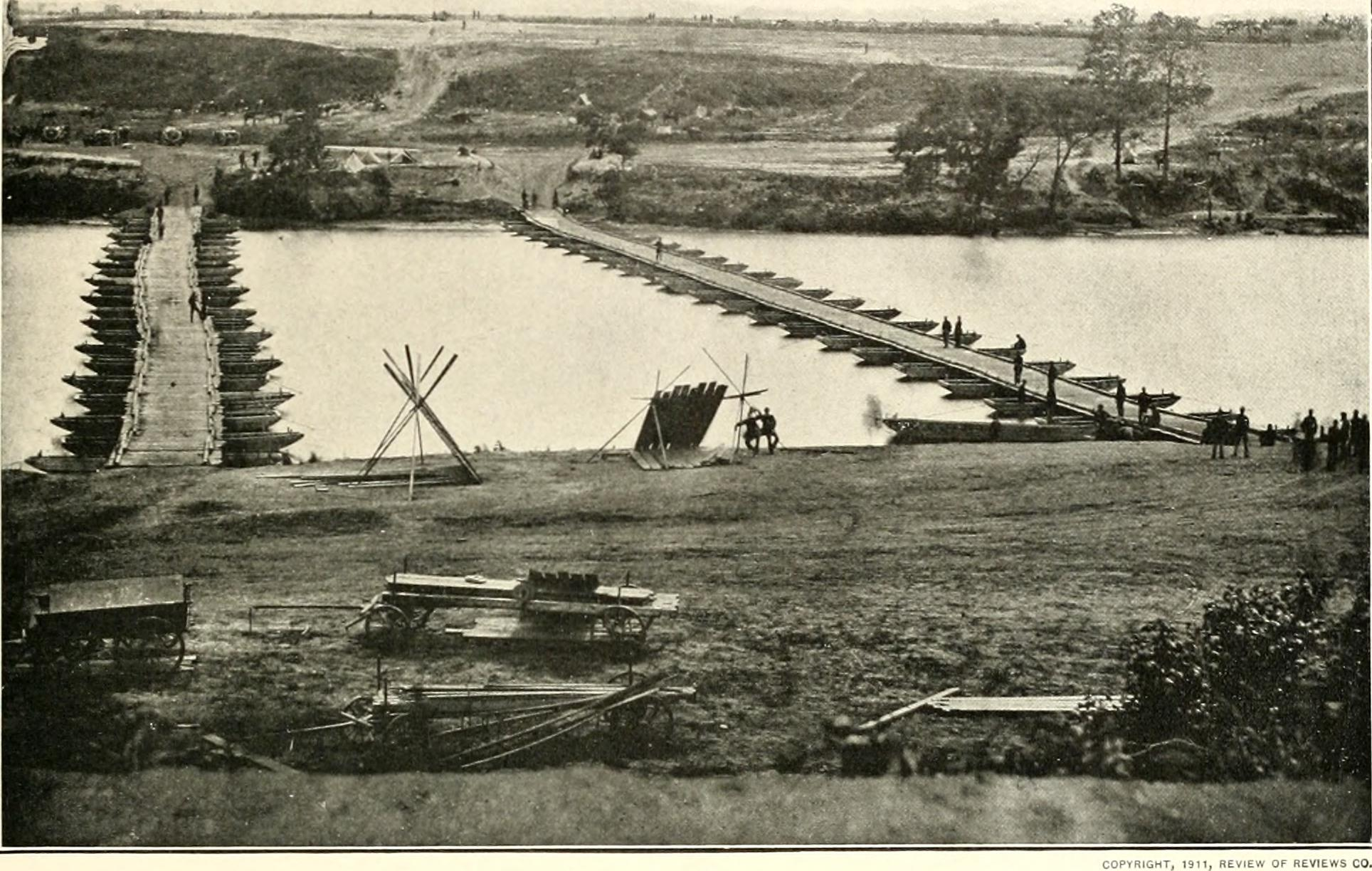
Two pontoon bridges at Franklin Crossing

By 5 pm on June 5, nearly all batteries of the 6th Corps had moved to Falmouth Heights and started shelling Confederates entrenched in rifle pits on the southern bank.

On the morning of June 6, Sedgwick ordered the 2nd Division under Brigadier General Albion P. Howe to make reconnaissance in force. As the 26th New Jersey and 5th Vermont regiments led the attack, Howe realized they risked significant losses, and directed Colonel Lewis A. Grant to cross the river in pontoon boats.

The Vermonters were able to successfully land the boats on the southern bank and overrun the Florida troops, capturing 35 prisoners. They then advanced up the bank to the edge of a woods where they encountered a strong detachment of Confederates supported by artillery. A hot fire fight ensued that was described as "severe" at times before the Union advance was halted and driven back across the river, suffering 57 casualties. When the Federals failed to attack again, Hill withdrew the following day to rejoin the army.

== Aftermath ==
By successfully defeating the Union reconnaissance party, A.P. Hill convinced Sedgwick that Lee still held Fredericksburg in force. Accordingly, Hooker remained along the Rappahanock giving Lee a valuable head start on his invasion. However, Hooker remained unsure of Lee's true position and intentions and accordingly ordered a reconnaissance by his Cavalry.

Learning that the majority of Lee's army was in Culpeper County, Virginia, Hooker ordered Brigadier General Alfred Pleasonton's cavalry to attack, resulting in the Battle of Brandy Station on June 9.
