= List of couples awarded the Nobel Prize =

Couples awarded the Nobel Prize

The following is a list of couples who were awarded and nominated for the Nobel Prize. The latest couple to receive the Prize were Abhijit Banerjee and Esther Duflo for Economics.

== Laureates ==
Year	Husband		Wife		Category	Citation	Sources
Year	Portrait	Name	Portrait	Name	Category	Citation	Sources
1903		Pierre Curie (1859–1906)		Marie Skłodowska-Curie (Note: Marie Curie was awarded the 1911 Nobel Prize in Chemistry "in recognition of her services to the advancement of chemistry by the discovery of the elements radium and polonium, by the isolation of radium and the study of the nature and compounds of this remarkable element.") (1867–1934)	Physics	"in recognition of the extraordinary services they have rendered by their joint researches on the radiation phenomena discovered by Professor Henri Becquerel." (awarded together with French physicist Henri Becquerel)	
1935		Frédéric Joliot (1900–1958)		Irène Joliot-Curie (1897–1956)	Chemistry	"in recognition of their synthesis of new radioactive elements."	
1947		Carl Ferdinand Cori (1896–1984)		Gerty Theresa Radnitz-Cori (1896–1957)	Physiology or Medicine	"for their discovery of the course of the catalytic conversion of glycogen." (awarded together with Argentine physiologist Bernardo Alberto Houssay)	
1974 and 1982		Gunnar Myrdal (1898–1987)		Alva Reimer-Myrdal (1902–1986)	Economics (1974) and Peace (1982)	"for [his] pioneering work in the theory of money and economic fluctuations and for their penetrating analysis of the interdependence of economic, social and institutional phenomena." (awarded together with Austrian-British economist and philosopher Friedrich Hayek)	
1974 and 1982		Gunnar Myrdal (1898–1987)		Alva Reimer-Myrdal (1902–1986)	Economics (1974) and Peace (1982)	"for [her] work for disarmament and nuclear and weapon-free zones." (awarded together with Mexican diplomat Alfonso García Robles)	
2014		Edvard Moser (Note: Edvard and May-Britt Moser announced their divorce in 2016, but still continue their scientific work together.) (born 1962)		May-Britt Moser (born 1963)	Physiology or Medicine	"for their discoveries of cells that constitute a positioning system in the brain." (awarded together with American-British neuroscientist John O'Keefe)	
2019		Abhijit Banerjee (born 1961)		Esther Duflo-Banerjee (born 1972)	Economic Sciences	"for their experimental approach to alleviating global poverty." (awarded together with American development economist Michael Kremer)	

== Nominations ==
The first couple nominated for the Nobel Prize were the American pacifists Edwin Mead (1849–1937) and Lucia Ames Mead (1856–1936). They were endorsed by Samuel Train Dutton (1849–1919) for their numerous contributions in the promotion of peace. Henceforth, other couples began getting nominated for the prestigious Swedish prize whether jointly or separately in their respective fields. Aside from the following couples with verified nominations from the Nobel Committee, there are also other couples purportedly endorsed and whose nominations are yet to be verified since the archives are revealed 50 years after, among them are Uğur Şahin and Özlem Türeci-Şahin (for Medicine), John Q. Trojanowski and Virginia Man-Yee Lee (for Medicine), Patrick S. Moore and Yuan Chang-Moore (for Medicine), John Kappler and Philippa Marrack-Kappler (for Medicine), Jerome Karle (Note: The Karles developed what is known as the direct method of determining molecular structures, which has been used by scientists to develop new compounds for industry and medicine. This breakthrough earned Jerome the 1958 Nobel Prize in Chemistry — though it snubbed Isabella's effort which greatly upset Jerome. Isabella apparently was unmoved by the slight, as she already had a distinguished record of awards for her experimental work.) and Isabella Lugoski Karle (for Chemistry), Richard Pevear and Larissa Volokhonsky-Pevear (for Literature), Paul Auster and Siri Hustvedt (for Literature), Bill Gates and Melinda French Gates (for Peace), Amory Lovins and Hunter Sheldon-Lovins (for Peace), Ivan Suvanjieff and Dawn Engle-Suvanjieff (for Peace), and Søren Johansen and Katarina Juselius-Johansen (for Economics).

=== Nominees ===
Husband		Wife		Motivation	Year(s) Nominated (Note: Years the couple were nominated together (some couples were nominated separately).)	Sources
Portrait	Name	Portrait	Name	Motivation	Year(s) Nominated	Sources
Physiology or Medicine
	Oskar Vogt (1870–1959)		Cécile Vogt-Mugnier (1875–1962)	"for their work concerning the anatomy and genetics of the brain (the architectonics of the cerebral cortex, cortex localization, function of corpus striatum, cerebral cytoarchitecture and myeloarchitectonics, diseases of the striatum system, aging of glial cells and their changes in schizophrenia)."	1922, 1923, 1926, 1928, 1929, 1930, 1950, 1951, 1953	
	George Frederick Dick (1881–1967)		Gladys Rowena Henry-Dick (1881–1963)	"for their work on scarlet fever (the etiology, identification of scarlet fever streptococci by neutralization of the toxin with specific antitoxin, passive immunization and treatment with antitoxin, toxin test for susceptibility and active immunization)."	1925, 1926, 1927, 1928, 1935	
	Edward Mellanby (1884–1955)		May Tweedy-Mellanby (1882–1978)	"for their work on the relation of dietary deficiencies to human diseases (rickets and the nervous conditions produced by lack of vitamin A, and dental structure and dental diseases)."	1939	
	David Tillerson Smith (1898–1981)		Susan Gower-Smith (1895–1983)	"for their work on the use of nicotinic acid in the pellagra therapy."	1939	
	George Van Siclen Smith (1900–1984)		Olive Watkins Smith (1901–1983)	"for their investigation of a possible hormonal cause of toxemia of pregnancy.	1940	
Physics
	Geoffrey Ronald Burbidge (1925–2010)		Margaret Peachey-Burbidge (1919–2020)	"for their fundamental theory on stellar nucleosynthesis that most heavier chemical elements were formed through stellar evolution."	1964	
	Pierre Connes (1928–2019)		Janine Roux-Connes (1926–2024)	"for their development of the Fourier transform infrared spectroscopy method."	1970	
Chemistry
	Walter Noddack (1893–1960)		Ida Tacke-Noddack (1896–1978)	"for their discovery of the chemical elements technetium and rhenium."	1933, 1935, 1937	
	Jacques Tréfouël (1897–1977)		Thérèse Broyer-Tréfouël (1892–1978)	"for their research on sulfanilamide, a novel class of antibiotic drug."	1950	
	Bernard Pullman (1919–1996)		Alberte Bucher-Pullman (1920–2011)	"for their contributions to the application of quantum chemistry to predicting the carcinogenic properties of aromatic hydrocarbons."	1963, 1965, 1968, 1969	
Literature
	Jean Paul Sartre (Note: Sartre famously proposed an open relationship and de Beauvoir agreed. Though not officially married in any ceremony, Sartre and De Beauvoir lived as a couple for over 50 years until their deaths in the 1980s. Sartre alone won the Nobel Prize in Literature in 1964 but he declined the prize.) (1905–1980)		Simone de Beauvoir (1908–1986)	J. P. Sartre: Nausea (1938); The Roads to Freedom (1945–49); Existentialism Is a Humanism (1946); Being and Nothingness (1954)	1957, 1958, 1959, 1960, 1961, 1962, 1963, 1964	
	Jean Paul Sartre (1905–1980)		Simone de Beauvoir (1908–1986)	S. de Beauvoir: She Came to Stay (1943); The Ethics of Ambiguity (1947); The Second Sex (1949); The Mandarins (1954)	1961, 1969	
Peace
	Edwin Doak Mead (1849–1937)		Lucia James Ames-Mead (1856–1936)	"for promoting together international justice and peace through peace conferences, managed to open a free peace academy in Boston (The International School of Peace), and publishing and distributing literature on peace."	1913	
	Franklin Delano Roosevelt (1882–1945)		Anna Eleanor Roosevelt (1884–1962)	F. D. Roosevelt "for taking an active part in the fields of politics, economics and culture in order to secure world peace, and for his efforts to end World War II."	1934, 1938, 1939, 1945	
	Franklin Delano Roosevelt (1882–1945)		Anna Eleanor Roosevelt (1884–1962)	A. E. Roosevelt "for her work to further understanding between people of different races and between people from different nations, especially while serving as Chairman of the UN Commission on Human Rights."	1947, 1949, 1955, 1956, 1962	
	Juan Domingo Perón (1895–1974)		María Eva Duarte-Perón (1919–1952)	"for their humanitarian efforts in Argentina particularly on promoting labor rights, championing women's suffrage, eliminating poverty and establishing charities to the working-class Argentines."	1949	
	Robert Baden-Powell (1857–1941)		Olave St. Clair Baden-Powell (1889–1977)	R. Baden-Powell "for having founded the Boys Scouts movement that embodies brotherly mentality and non-militaristic characters."	1928, 1933, 1937, 1938, 1939	
	Robert Baden-Powell (1857–1941)		Olave St. Clair Baden-Powell (1889–1977)	O. Baden-Powell "for her international contribution as a founder of the Scout movement for girls."	1959	
	Geoffrey Leonard Cheshire (1917–1992)		Margaret Susan Ryder-Cheshire (1924–2000)	"for establishing numerous charitable health and welfare organizations for the physically disabled and people living with terminal illnesses and neurological conditions."	1967	
	Gunnar Myrdal (1898–1987)		Alva Reimer-Myrdal (1902–1986)	"for their many services to the international community and their promotion of international understanding."	1959, 1970	
	Gunnar Myrdal (1898–1987)		Alva Reimer-Myrdal (1902–1986)	"for their many services to the international community and their promotion of international understanding."	1970, 1975	
	Clarence Streit (1896–1986)		Jeanne DeFrance Streit (1899–2000)	C. Streit " for his deep understanding of the principle of federal union, which has enabled free men across a continent to organize themselves together in peace, with freedom and prosperity."	1950, 1952, 1953, 1955, 1957, 1962, 1963, 1964, 1965, 1967, 1968, 1970, 1971, 1973, 1974, 1975	
	Clarence Streit (1896–1986)		Jeanne DeFrance Streit (1899–2000)	J. DeFrance Streit	1974, 1975	
