= Yamjal =

Yamjal may refer to

- Devar Yamjal in Ranga Reddy District
- Turkayamjal in Ranga Reddy District
