= Review of Agrarian Studies =

The Review of Agrarian Studies is a peer-reviewed academic journal publishing research related to multidisciplinary theoretical and empirical investigations into agrarian studies in the developing world. It was founded in Indian based Foundation for Agrarian Studies (FAS) (www.agrarianstudies.org) and is published by them with Tulika Books (New Delhi). Its editor is V. K. Ramachandran of the FAS Bengaluru and its other editorial team include the following: Barbara Harriss-White, John Harriss, Cao Đức Phát, Sanjay G. Reddy and Sukhadeo Thorat.
