= Leora Klapper =

American economist

Leora F Klapper
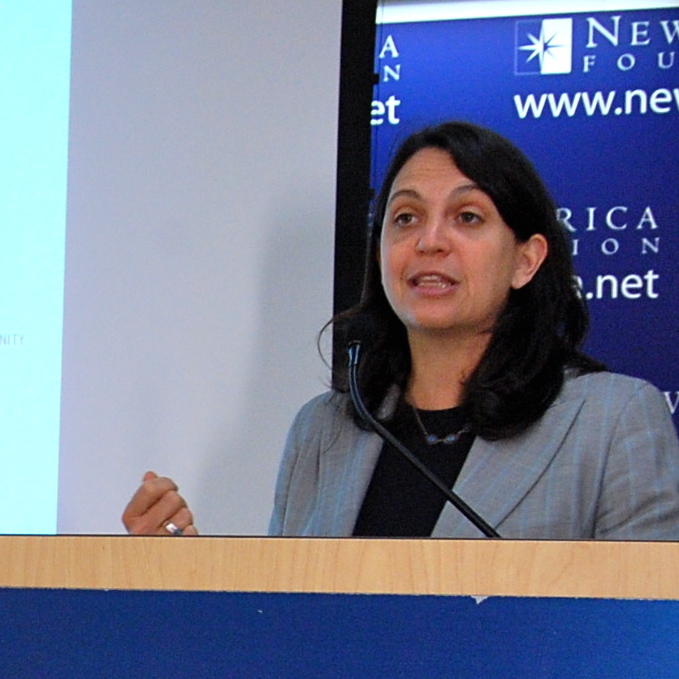
- Education: State University of New York at Binghamton; Stern School of Business, New York University
- Occupations: Economist; Economic and Market Analyst; Researcher; Author; Speaker
- Notable work: The Global Findex Database 2017: Measuring Financial Inclusion and the Fintech Revolution; Entrepreneurship Snapshots 2010: Measuring the Impact of the Financial Crisis on New Business Registration
- Website: https://sites.google.com/site/leoraklapper/

Leora F. Klapper is an American economist who currently works as a lead economist at the World Bank in the Finance and Private Sector research team as part of the Development Research group. Klapper has held government jobs in Washington, DC and Jerusalem, Israel in the Bank of Israel, as well as having held private sector jobs for Peter L. Bernstein and the Salomon Brothers firm in New York. She is also the founder of The Global Findex Database and Entrepreneurship Database.

== Education ==
Klapper received her B.S. in Economics and Math (with Honors) at the State University of New York at Binghamton in 1990. Klapper then earned her Ph.D. in Financial Economics from the Stern School of Business at New York University in 1998 where she specialized in Corporate Finance, Financial institutions, and wrote her final dissertation "Essays on Collateralization". While at the Stern School of Business, Klapper earned the Dean's "Outstanding Teaching Award" for a graduate instructor (1997), the Berkley Center for Entrepreneurial Studies Fellowship (1996–1998), and the University Doctoral Fellowship at New York University (1993–1996).

== Career ==
Klapper currently works as a Lead Economist in the Finance and Private Sector Research Team of the Development Research Group at the World Bank, having joined as a Young Economist in 1998, focusing on entrepreneurship, access to finance, corporate governance, bankruptcy, and risk management. She has also been a co-editor for the World Bank Economic Review since 2016. Klapper has previously held public sector jobs from 1988 to 1992 working for the Office of Management and Budget and the Federal Reserve Board of Governors in Washington, DC. She has also worked public sector jobs abroad, working at the Bank of Israel from 1992 to 1993. Klapper has also held many private sector jobs such as working for Peter L. Bernstein in New York, NY, as a researcher for the publication “Against the Gods: The Remarkable Story of Risk” from 1995 to 1996 and having worked for the Salomon Brothers doing Economic and Market analysis from 1995 to 1998. She has also been a member of the BBVA Financial Literacy Board from 2016 to present and a Data Fellow for the Mastercard Center for Inclusive Growth.

Klapper is also an Implementing Partner of the G-20 Global Partnership for Financial Inclusion (2010–present). She is also currently working as her Majesty Queen Maxima of the Netherlands UN Secretary-General’s Special Advocate for Inclusive Finance and for Development (UNSGSA) as a Reference Group Member (2016–present). She has also held positions as a working group member for the World Economic Forum Financial Inclusion Metrics and the OECD, as well as a board member for insight2impact.

Klapper has been invited to present at the World Economic Forum, Bloomberg Data for Good Exchange, several international banks, G20 Global Partnership Summits, The Guardian, the UN, the Brookings Foundation, as well as many business schools worldwide. Her topics have ranged from financial inclusion lifting poverty, mobile money implementation, the link between financial inclusion and economic growth, gender and income discrepancies, to the digital revolution and female labour force participation.

== Research and academic work ==
Klapper's primary research fields include: Behavioral economics, consumer finance, digital payments, entrepreneurial finance, financial inclusion, risk management, and supply chain finance. Much of Klapper's work explores the relationship between an economy's involvement in the financial system and how this effects income, growth, and wellbeing. She explores an economy's financial involvement in many different ways ranging from what being an active member in the formal financial system signals to an employer, to how financial inclusion disproportionately grows and affects people across gender, geography, and wealth. Her research has been cited in 18,205 published and working papers, as well as being cited in press such as The New York Times, The Economist, The Wall Street Journal, The Guardian, and Forbes.

Klapper's most prolific works include The Global Findex Database 2017: Measuring Financial Inclusion and the Fintech Revolution and Entrepreneurship Snapshots 2010: Measuring the Impact of the Financial Crisis on New Business, both of which were published with the World Bank. Klapper has also contributed chapters to many different books on topics ranging from banking and financial inclusion in developing economies to entrepreneurship and its effect on firm formation. Her current working papers include examining how civil conflict affects firm performance, the effectiveness of government delivery of goods and services, and benefits from illiquid savings products.

== Select scholarship ==
=== "The Global Findex Database 2017: Measuring Financial Inclusion and the Fintech Revolution" ===
Under the supervision of Asli Demirgüç-Kunt, Klapper oversaw a team of Dorothe Singer, Saniya Ansar, and Jake Hess to create a database and report that summarizes global financial inclusion as a result of the financial technology revolution. The report documents account ownership by economy, areas lacking banking infrastructure, how different economies make payments, how accounts are used, the amount of saving, credit, and financial resilience, and the opportunities that are arising for promoting financial inclusion due to the rise of the digital era. The Global Findex Database has had over 40,000 press citations since being founded by Klapper in 2011. The report was compiled using surveys of more than 150,000 adults over the age of 15 in over 140 economies, giving detailed results of how adults in these economies access accounts, make payments, borrow, and manage risk. The authors note that this data is important since it has been found that access to financial technology like mobile money services can increase income earning potential, and that these benefits are even more pronounced for women. This access to mobile money services in Kenya enabled women to increase their savings and investments by more than one-fifth and reduce extreme poverty in women-led households by 22%.

The report found that the global share of adults that own a bank account is 69%, which is up from 62% in 2014 and 58% in 2011. This equates into 515 million adults worldwide who have gained access to financial tools to help grow the economy. Klapper and the report note that this gain was most prevalent in Sub-Saharan Africa where 21% of adults now have a mobile money account, almost double what the 2014 report showed. It was also found that the financial technology improvements have led to 52% of adults having sent digital payments, 10 percentage points higher than the 2014 value, with significant gains in China where 57% now use financial technology to pay bills, double the 2014 value. Importantly, the report notes that women lag significantly behind men globally in their financial inclusion gains; 65% of women have opened accounts, compared to 72% of men. Klapper also points out that there is a disparity in financial inclusion across income levels. Financial participation was 13 percentage points higher in the wealthiest 60% of household incomes, evident in the 200 million rural people in China outside of the formal financial system.

=== "Entrepreneurship Snapshots 2010: Measuring the Impact of the Financial Crisis on New Business" ===
Leora Klapper along with Inessa Love led a team of Elena Cirmizi, Caroline Giraud, and Douglas Randall to create a report documenting new business sector growth from 2004–2009 to give insight into factors that spur private sector growth across different economies. Like the Global Findex Database, this database was founded by Leora Klapper in 2004. The report measures entrepreneurial activity in 112 developing and high income economies to answer the following 4 questions: 1. How does firm creation vary around the world with the level of economic and financial development? 2. What is the relationship between entrepreneurship and business development? 3. How did the financial crisis affect entrepreneurial activity in the formal sector? and 4. What factors determined how severely the crisis affected new firm creation? This is based on Klapper, Laeven, & Rajan's 2004 study which shows that a high entry rate of new businesses equates to higher competition in the economy as well as higher economic growth.

The paper's main data collected is the density of new business entry, measured by the number of newly registered limited liability firms per 1,000 people of working age (15–64), collected directly from the registrar. The paper notes that this is an effective measure but is only able to capture the formal financial sector even though much of the production in some economies lies in the informal financial sector. The paper finds a discrepancy across income levels of countries, namely that high-income countries had more than 4 new business registered per 1000 people, while low-medium and low income countries had less than 1 per 1000 people. The paper discusses that this largely could be due to the factors that come with being a high income country. Specifically, the paper notes that there is more dynamic business creation when there is also stable legal and regulatory regimes, efficient business registration systems, flexible employment regulations, and low corporate tax rates. The paper also determines that due to a sharp increase in the scarcity of credit and an uncertain future economic outlook following the 2008 financial crisis there was a sharp drop in registration rates in countries affected by such - namely countries with strong formal financial sectors.

=== "Financial Inclusion and Inclusive Growth: A Review of Recent Empirical Evidence" ===
Asli Demirgüç-Kunt, Leora Klapper, and Dorothe singer review the evidence presented in their Global Findex Database (2014; 2017) to explore some of the conclusions made and resulting challenges to reaching greater financial inclusion and future direction for the field. The authors propose that financial inclusion can reduce poverty by helping people invest in their future towards education and new businesses, smooth their consumption by having more efficient and safer transactions, as well as educating and helping people manage their financial risks involving loss of employment or the death of a breadwinner, hopefully making it so fewer people fall into poverty initially as well. The paper documents the transition in economic theory worldwide over the past decade from a focus on microcredit loans in developing countries to a focus on account ownership, savings, payment methods, and insurance in these countries.

The paper points to the findings from the Global Findex Database (2014; 2017) that show account ownership worldwide is 69%, however this paper notes discrepancies across economies in that high-income OECD countries have account ownership of 94% while developing countries only have 54%. It is also found that while in high-income OECD countries there is no discrepancy across gender, in developing countries there remains a 9 percentage-point difference. The authors go further to note that among these developing regions there are enormous disparities; account penetration is only 14% in the Middle East, while in East Asia and the Pacific account penetration is 69%. The importance of a mobile money account is also explored in this paper and the authors report that while, of global account owners, 60% only have an account at a financial institution, 1% have a financial account and a mobile money account, and 1% only have a mobile money account. Interestingly, this stat is much different in Sub-Saharan Africa and Kenya where 23% and 58% of adults have a mobile money account respectively. When discussing the benefits of financial inclusion and digital payment later it is reported that this relatively high prevalence of mobile money accounts should help in promoting potential economic benefits.

The paper dedicates a section towards discussing the benefits of financial inclusion in developing countries and why this can largely explain the shift in economic thinking away from micro-loans towards financial inclusion. Many of the benefits are borne out of replacing cash payments for digital payments through accounts, whether this be payments from or to governments or banks, it is reported there are benefits for all sides. Based on the findings in the Global Findex Database (2014; 2017), high-income OECD countries make 95% of payments using digital methods while in the developing world 90% of utility payments are still made in cash, as well as other non-utility payments still being made majority in cash. The paper reveals that shifting from cash payments to digital payments reduces the cost of making and receiving payments. This cost saving was revealed to be large enough in developing countries to feed an agricultural-based family of 5 for a day.

The authors also point to a Niger study which showed that the government switching to digital payments reduced total costs of making and receiving payments by 20% annually. In South Africa this switch reduced payment costs by two thirds of the original level, and in Mexico this equated to an annual saving of 1.3 billion dollars (USD). The benefits are not only borne in cost saving but also in increasing the security of payments made. Klapper et al. argue that the opportunity for crime on digital payments is less and therefore the incidence has also been reduced, as seen in the US as overall crime has reduced by 10% from 1995 to 2015 as social payments became digital rather than cash. Corruption is also reduced through digital payments as there is less opportunity for illegal kickbacks, as reported in Argentina when kickbacks to illegal benefactors were reduced from 4% to 0.03%, and in India they fell by 47%. It is also reported that creating a trail of payment history through digital account payments helps someone have better availability to credit and make large payments later on.

=== "Financial Inclusion Through Savings: Commitment Devices, Mobile Money, and the Role of Trust" ===
This paper by Emily Breza, Martin Kanz, and Leora Klapper explores the dynamic between employer and employee and the role that an employee investing in savings and financial accounts linked with the firm has with their likelihood to receive investment or promotion. The paper suggests that by investing in a financial option put forward by the company an employee can signal that they are responsible, willing to accept advice, and committed to the firm for a long-term career. The authors create a study to examine this by offering a presentation of a financial savings account linked with the firm to all employees who demonstrate a willingness to save, and then give managers of the firm different profiles of employees regarding information including their decision to invest or not. The study takes place in Bangladesh at a large manufacturing firm due to the high turnover and transitory characteristics of employees. The financial product offered is a simple commitment savings product with a 1-5 year commitment horizon with payments being automatically taken out of your payroll bi-weekly and the highest value being reached with the longest (5-year) term and penalties for terminating the contract early.

There were several different versions of the presentation given to employees who had plans to save. The first presentation was only the basic presentation containing only information about the savings product. The second presentation included a stipulation that the savings product was endorsed by the employer. The third presentation included a stipulation that an employee's decision would be shared with the employer, and the final presentation contained all 3 pieces of information. It was found that the information that the employer endorsed the product had no effect on the probability of an employee choosing to sign up or not. This piece of information was only effective when it was combined with the fact that the employee's decision would be shared with the employer, increasing the probability an employee would sign up for a commitment to the savings product. It was also found that the commitment length an employee would sign up for is consistent with the same influencing pieces of information, leading the researchers to believe that workers were choosing a length based on signalling commitment and not just based on learning of the savings product benefits.

In terms of the effect on management decisions, the researchers used 56 floor managers to review 16 employee profiles each and choose one for promotion or choose employees to invest extra training in. On each employee profile there was a mix of information shown on the form, whether that be no financial decision, some financial decision, or full information of length and choice of commitment. It was found that showing that an employee chose to sign up for the commitment did not make being chosen for a promotion more likely. However, this choice to sign up for the commitment made it more likely that they were chosen to receive managerial investment in extra training, specifically 8 percentage points more likely to receive investment (64% increase over baseline probability). There was also a large difference found between the likelihood of receiving training between those who chose a 5-year commitment and those that chose a 1-year commitment. Specifically, those who chose a 5-year commitment were 14.7 percentage points more likely to receive the investment (118% over baseline), with the difference between long and short commitments being statistically significant at the 5% level.

=== "Salary Delays and Overdrafts in Rural Ghana" ===
This paper explores two common costly forms of payments that are especially widespread in developing economies: payday loans and overdrafts. Developing economies are likely to have these common forms of payment due to increased uncertain of payment schedules from employers to employees. The authors note that this is a problem since employees end up shouldering the cost of employers' inefficiency in making payments. To determine the effect of these inefficient payment schedules the authors gathered data from the North Volta Rural Bank in Ghana. Ghana is a good study area since developing economies are more severely affected and just over 500,000 public sector employees receive digital payments from the government, many of which are late according to the paper. In 2017 it was determined that there was US$167 million in outstanding late payments that have yet to be paid in Ghana.

The paper's analysis covered 320 salaried workers (90% public sector) with the North Volta Rural Bank. Overdrafting was charged a flat rate of GH₵ 5 and 18% of the over drafted amount in Ghana. It was found that the year before the study 58% of the people in question had taken out an overdraft, equating to a rate on average of US$104, or 42% of the average monthly salary. It was also found that people who take out overdrafts are more likely to be men, be more educated, less likely to live with seniors in their home, and are more likely to be in low-paying public sector jobs. The authors find that if the last salary payment was late, it was 3 percentage points more likely to overdraft that month, with more than a 10% increase in the average overdraft rate. The discrepancy across public and private sectors was high with 40% of worker months having a late salary for public sector workers, and only 13% of working months for private sector employees. The authors conclude that in Ghana public sector employees have to bear the majority of the late salary costs associated with increased delays in payments.

=== "Incentivizing Calculated Risk-Taking: Evidence from an Experiment with Commercial Bank Loan Officers" ===
Shawn Cole, Martin Kanz, and Leora Klapper (2012) explore how risk taking and effort can be incentivized in commercial loan officers in order to determine optimal incentive schemes in the wake of the 2008 financial crisis which saw an incredible amount of sub-prime loans defaulted on. In order to do such, the authors recruited loan officers from leading Indian commercial banks who would come in after-hours to review 14,000 actual credit applications. The loan officers evaluate the applications, fill out a risk-evaluation form, and then make a recommendation on whether the loan should be granted or not - which is later compared to the actual performance outcomes of the loans. The loans are composed of small business working capital loans with a value less than US$10,000. Four main problems arise in this environment which spurred the questions regarding this paper; First, effort of loan officers is difficult to quantify and observe by bank executives. Second, loan officers are protected by limited liability of loan performance. Third, loan officers have a different time horizon and higher discount rates then firm executives. Finally, the loan environment is high risk and there is a disconnect between the loan officer and the return from the loan, all of which lead to high information asymmetry and high opportunity for moral hazard problems.

Three main incentive schemes are evaluated in this paper: volume-based incentive schemes that reward origination, low-powered incentive schemes that reward origination and are conditional on performance, and high-powered incentive schemes that reward performance but penalize loan officers on defaults. Deferred payment schedules were also evaluated given the asymmetry in time horizon and discount rates between officer and firm. Volume-based incentives that reward origination were found to generate more loans but with lower average quality, measured by returns and default rate. Performance-based incentive schemes were found to result in a greater screening effort by the loan officer, reduced exposure to loans with higher credit risk, and significantly more profitable loan decisions with only slightly less quantity of loans given out. When comparing low-powered incentives with high-powered incentives it was found that high-powered incentives increased the probability of detecting a 'bad' loan and increased profits per loan by up to 3.5% of the median loan size. Compared to the same standard, volume-based incentive schemes were found to reduce profits per loan by up to 5% of the median loan size, as expected.

Given the increased effort exerted under performance-based incentive schemes, it is found that risk assessment is inflated by as much as 0.3 standard deviations, regardless of the actual asset quality. It was also found that loan officers under these schemes were more likely to inflate all features, even those hard to quantify like the applicant's character based on their brief background and business overview. Differed compensation was found to reduce effectiveness of incentive schemes pointed at making loan officers exert more effort. It was found that a 3-month delay on the incentive pay reduced the screening effort by 5-14% and there was a corresponding decrease in quality of loan performance. Differed compensation, however, was found to moderate the negative effect of volume-based incentive schemes by reducing the officer's incentive to short-sightedly give out many loans. This problem could also be corrected by relaxing the limited liability constraint, which has a similar effect as giving officers equity in the loan, resulting in more conservative loans being awarded.

== Blog posts and press citations ==
Klapper has written the following select blog posts for many different media outlets, international organizations, and foundations. Some organizations for which she has written blog posts include the World Economic Forum, World Bank, Brookings Institution, and the London School of Economics.

Klapper is often cited in reports from press institutions worldwide, including The Economist, The New York Times, The Wall Street Journal, and Bloomberg.

== Awards ==
In 2018, Klapper received the Accion Edward W. Claugus Award for exceptional leadership and innovation in financial inclusion.
