= Abhijit Banerjee =

Indian-American economist (born 1961)

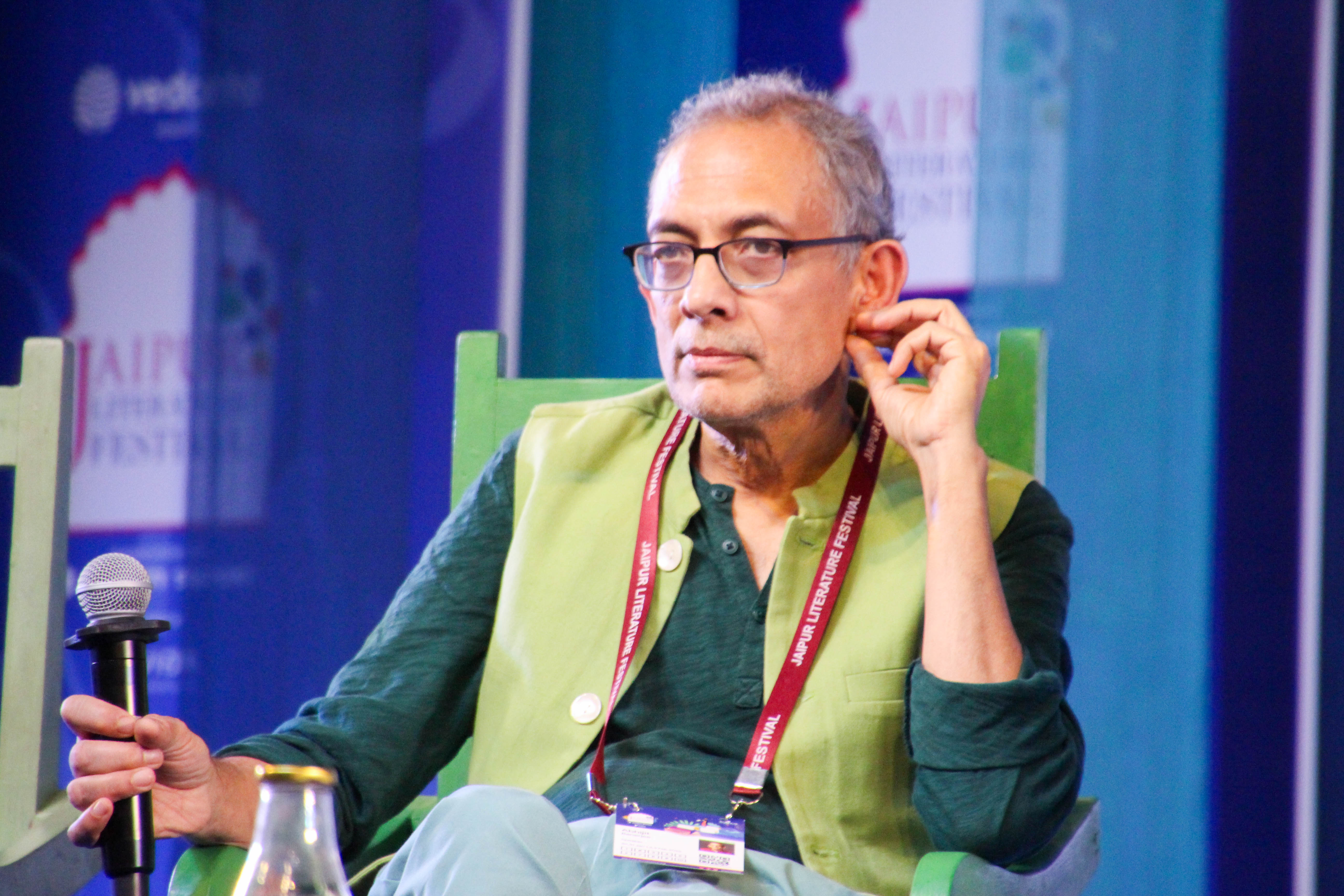
- Banerjee in 2025
- Born: February 21, 1961 (age 65); Mumbai, Maharashtra, India
- Citizenship: American
- Occupation: Economist
- Spouses: Arundhati Tuli Banerjee (div. 2014); Esther Duflo (m. 2015)
- Children: 3
- Awards: Sloan Research Fellowship (1994); Guggenheim Fellowship; Infosys Prize (2009); Nobel Memorial Prize in Economic Sciences (2019); Golden Plate from Academy of Achievement (2022)

Academic background
- Education: Presidency College (BSc); Jawaharlal Nehru University (MA); Harvard University (PhD)
- Thesis: Essays on Information Economics (1988)
- Doctoral advisor: Eric Maskin • Andreu Mas-Colell • Jerry Green

Academic work
- Discipline: Economics
- Sub-discipline: Development economics
- Institutions: University of Zurich (2026–); MIT (1993–present); NBER (2006–present); Harvard University (1992–1993); Princeton University (1988-1992)
- Doctoral students: Esther Duflo • Dean Karlan • João Leão • Benjamin Jones • Nancy Qian • Maitreesh Ghatak • Asim Khwaja

Abhijit Vinayak Banerjee (Note: Bengali pronunciation: [obʱid͡ʒit̪ binae̯ɔk bɔnd̪opad̪ʱːae̯].) (Bengali pronunciation: [obʱid͡ʒit̪ binae̯ɔk bɔnd̪opad̪ʱːae̯]; born 21 February 1961) is an Indian American economist who is currently the Lemann Foundation Professor in Economics at the University of Zurich (UZH). He is co-founder and co-director of the Abdul Latif Jameel Poverty Action Lab (J-PAL), an MIT based global research center promoting the use of scientific evidence to inform poverty alleviation strategies. In 2019, Banerjee shared the Nobel Memorial Prize in Economic Sciences with Esther Duflo and Michael Kremer, "for their experimental approach to alleviating global poverty." He and Esther Duflo are married, and became the sixth married couple to jointly win a Nobel or Nobel Memorial Prize on economic sciences.

Banerjee's academic appointments include being a fellow of the Econometric Society, a member of the National Academy of Sciences, and a fellow of the American Academy of Arts and Sciences. In 1994, he received a Sloan Research Fellowship, awarded annually to early career researchers with the "potential to revolutionize their fields." According to Research Papers in Economics, Banerjee is among the most productive development economists in the world, ranking in the top 75 researchers by total research output.

== Early life and education ==
Banerjee was born to a Bengali father and a Marathi mother in Mumbai. His father, Dipak Banerjee, was a professor of economics at Presidency College, Calcutta, and received his PhD from the London School of Economics under the supervision of Richard Lipsey. His mother, Nirmala (née Patankar) Banerjee was a professor at the Centre for Studies in Social Sciences, Calcutta.

Banerjee attended secondary school at South Point School in Kolkata, where he was described as a "brilliant" but "very quiet" student. During high school, he was interested in literature, history, philosophy, and mathematics, choosing to pursue his undergraduate studies in the latter at the Indian Statistical Institute, Kolkata. He dropped out of the program after one week, transferring to Presidency College, then an affiliate of the University of Calcutta, to study economics.

Banerjee spent three years at Presidency, receiving a BSc (Honors) in Economics in 1981. He took classes with his father, Dipak Banerjee, in addition to Mihir Rakshit. His favorite subject was economic history, taught by Nabhendu Sen.

After completing his undergraduate studies, Banerjee pursued an MA in Economics at Jawaharlal Nehru University, New Delhi, selecting to study there over the Delhi School of Economics because of its political life, and the latter's reputation as a stepping stone to PhD programs in the United States, which Banerjee had little interest in pursuing. His teachers included Anjan Mukherjee and Krishna Bharadwaj, the latter of whom taught a course on the history of economic thought. While studying at JNU, Banerjee was arrested, imprisoned, and beaten at Tihar Jail, in response to a protest in which students gheraoed the then vice chancellor of the university. He completed his degree in 1983, and was encouraged by his parents and teachers to apply for PhD programs in economics.

Banerjee applied to Harvard, Stanford, and the University of California, Berkeley, attending the first of these despite no students from Jawaharlal Nehru University having previously been admitted to the university. At Harvard, his classmates included Tyler Cowen, Alan Krueger, Steven Kaplan, and Nouriel Roubini. He attended courses with Andreu Mas-Colell, Lawrence Summers, Kala Krishna, Oliver Hart, and Susan Collins, and briefly served as a research assistant to Jeffrey Sachs. His dissertation research, supervised by Eric Maskin, was primarily theoretical, and examined the economics of information.

== Academic career ==
Banerjee is currently the Ford Foundation International Professor of Economics at the Massachusetts Institute of Technology; he has taught at Harvard University and Princeton University. He has also been a Guggenheim Fellow and an Alfred P. Sloan Fellow.

His work focuses on development economics. Together with Esther Duflo he has discussed field experiments as an important methodology to discover causal relationships in economics. He was elected a fellow of the American Academy of Arts and Sciences in 2004. In 2009, he received the Infosys Prize in the social sciences (economics) category. He served on the Social Sciences jury for the Infosys Prize in 2018. In 2012, he shared the Gerald Loeb Award Honorable Mention for Business Book with co-author Esther Duflo for their book Poor Economics.

In 2013, he was named by the United Nations Secretary-General Ban Ki-moon to a panel of experts tasked with updating the Millennium Development Goals after 2015 (their expiration date).

In 2014, he received the Bernhard-Harms-Prize from the Kiel Institute for the World Economy.

In 2019, he delivered Export-Import Bank of India's 34th Commencement Day Annual Lecture on Redesigning Social Policy. That same year, was awarded the Nobel Prize in Economics, together with Esther Duflo and Michael Kremer, "for their experimental approach to alleviating global poverty".

In October 2025, the University of Zurich announced that Banerjee and Duflo would be joining the faculty of the UZH Faculty of Business, Economics, and Informatics in July 2026, where they would co-direct the newly established Lemann Center for Development, Education and Public Policy. The center and Banerjee and Duflo's endowed professorships were created following a 26 million franc (US$32.5 million) donation from Swiss-Brazilian billionaire Jorge Paulo Lemann's Lemann Foundation. The couple would maintain part-time positions at MIT.

=== Research and work in India ===
Banerjee and his co-workers try to measure the effectiveness of actions (such as government programmes) in improving people's lives. For this, they use randomized controlled trials, similar to clinical trials in medical research. For example, although polio vaccination is freely available in India, many mothers were not bringing their children for the vaccination drives. Banerjee and Prof. Esther Duflo, also from MIT, tried an experiment in Rajasthan, where they gave a bag of pulses to mothers who vaccinated their children. Soon, the immunization rate went up in the region. In another experiment, they found that learning outcomes improved in schools that were provided with teaching assistants to help students with special needs.

Banerjee is a co-founder of Abdul Latif Jameel Poverty Action Lab (along with economists the thavamEsther Duflo and Sendhil Mullainathan). In India he serves on the academic advisory board of Plaksha University, a science and technology university established in 2010.

Banerjee wrote a cookbook in 2021, Cooking To Save Your Life, which was illustrated by Cheyenne Olivier.

== Personal life ==
Abhijit Banerjee has been married twice. His first marriage was to literary scholar Arundhati Tuli Banerjee. The couple met as childhood friends in Kolkata and both worked at MIT. They divorced in 2014, and their only son died by suicide in 2016.

Banerjee's second marriage is to economist Esther Duflo. The couple met in 1995 when Duflo was a student in Banerjee's development economics class at MIT. They have two children, born in 2012 and 2014, and were married in 2015.

== Publications ==
=== Books ===
In 2019, he wrote together with Esther Duflo his latest book, "Good Economics for Hard Times," where he discusses possible solutions to a series of current issues such as inequality, climate change, and globalization.

- Aghion, Philippe; Banerjee, Abhijit (2005). Volatility And Growth. Oxford: Oxford University Press. ISBN 9780199248612.
- Banerjee, Abhijit Vinayak; Bénabou, Roland; Mookherjee, Dilip, eds. (2006). Understanding Poverty. Oxford; New York: Oxford University Press. ISBN 9780195305203.
- Banerjee, Abhijit Vinayak (2005). Making Aid Work. Cambridge: MIT Press. ISBN 9780262026154.
- Banerjee, Abhijit V.; Duflo, Esther (2011). Poor Economics: A Radical Rethinking of the Way to Fight Global Poverty. New York: PublicAffairs. ISBN 9781610390408.
- Banerjee, Abhijit Vinayak; Duflo, Esther, eds. (2017). Handbook of Field Experiments, Volume 1. North-Holland Publishing Company. ISBN 9780444633248.
- Banerjee, Abhijit Vinayak; Duflo, Esther, eds. (2017). Handbook of Field Experiments, Volume 2. North-Holland Publishing Company. ISBN 9780444640116.
- Banerjee, Abhijit Vinayak (2019). A Short History of Poverty Measurements. Juggernaut Books.
- Banerjee, Abhijit V.; Duflo, Esther (2019). Good Economics for Hard Times. PublicAffairs. ISBN 9781541762879.

== Awards ==
Abhijit Banerjee was awarded the Nobel Memorial Prize in Economic Sciences in 2019 along with his two co-researchers Esther Duflo and Michael Kremer "for their experimental approach to alleviating global poverty".

The press release from the Royal Swedish Academy of Sciences noted: "Their experimental research methods now entirely dominate development economics."

The Nobel committee commented:

"Banerjee, Duflo and their co-authors concluded that students appeared to learn nothing from additional days at school. Neither did spending on textbooks seem to boost learning, even though the schools in Kenya lacked many essential inputs. Moreover, in the Indian context Banerjee and Duflo intended to study, many children appeared to learn little: in results from field tests in the city of Vadodara fewer than one in five third-grade students could correctly answer first-grade curriculum math test questions.

"In response to such findings, Banerjee, Duflo and co-authors argued that efforts to get more children into school must be complemented by reforms to improve school quality."

The Nobel Prize was a major recognition for the field of development economics, and for the use of randomised controlled trials. It evoked mixed emotions in India, where his success was celebrated with nationalistic fervour while his approach and pro-poor focus were seen as a negation of India's current government's right-wing ideology as well as broader development discourse.

Banerjee's achievement of the Nobel Prize was received with a cold shoulder by the right-wing Bharatiya Janata Party, which is in power at the Union level in India, because he was one of the economists that were consulted by Rahul Gandhi in formulating a basic-income support scheme called NYAY, which was the main electoral promise of the Indian National Congress in the 2019 Indian general election. In response to his criticism of the Union government's handling of the country's economy, Commerce & Industries Minister Piyush Goyal, while speaking on Banerjee's receiving of the Nobel Prize on Twitter, denounced Banerjee's economic theories on the grounds of being based on a leftist viewpoint and argued that by voting for the BJP, the Indian masses had 'totally rejected' his thoughts. BJP leader Rahul Sinha, who had served as the state BJP president in Banerjee's native state of West Bengal, downplayed his achievements and interpreted the Nobel Committee's decision to award Banerjee shortly after he had divorced his Hindu wife in order to marry a non-Hindu person (interpreted within Hindu nationalist circles as a means of religious conversion) as Hinduphobia. Banerjee remains the lone Indian Nobel laurete not to be felicitated by the Indian government.

He was awarded the Doctor of Letters (Honoris Causa) by the University of Calcutta in January 2020.

Abhijit Banerjee and Esther Duflo received the Golden Plate Award of the American Academy of Achievement in September 2022.

== See also ==
- Amartya Sen, economist and the first Indian to receive a Nobel prize in the field
