= Good Economics for Hard Times =

2019 nonfiction book by Abhijit Banerjee and Esther Duflo

Good Economics for Hard Times: Better Answers to Our Biggest Problems
- First edition cover (UK/India)
- Author: Abhijit V. Banerjee; Esther Duflo
- Audio read by: James Lurie
- Working title: Good Economics, Bad Economics: Six Ways We Get the World Wrong and How to Set It Right
- Language: English
- Subject: Economics
- Publisher: PublicAffairs
- Publication date: November 12, 2019
- Publication place: United States
- Media type: Print (hardback)
- Pages: 432 pp
- ISBN: 978-1-61039-950-0 (US)

Good Economics for Hard Times: Better Answers to Our Biggest Problems is a 2019 nonfiction book by Abhijit V. Banerjee and Esther Duflo, both professors of economics at MIT. It was published on November 12, 2019 by PublicAffairs (US), Juggernaut Books (India), and Allen Lane (UK). The book draws from recent developments in economics research to argue solutions to the issues facing modern economies and societies around the world, including slowing economic growth, immigration, income inequality, climate change, globalization and technological unemployment. It is their second collaborative book since the publication of their book Poor Economics: A Radical Rethinking of the Way to Fight Global Poverty (2011) and their first since becoming a married couple in 2015. The book's publication comes a month after Banerjee and Duflo were jointly awarded the Nobel Prize in Economics, shared with Harvard University professor Michael Kremer.

== Summary ==
Banerjee and Duflo draw from recent developments in economics research to argue solutions to the issues facing modern economies and societies around the world, including slowing economic growth, immigration, income inequality, climate change, globalization and technological unemployment. The book argues against the idea that immigrants lower wages and take jobs from native workers. They also argue that people in poverty often make more sound financial decisions than is normally attributed to them.

== Publication and promotion ==
In October 2019, Banerjee traveled to India to promote the book, with speaking engagements in the capital of New Delhi and his hometown of Kolkata. The trip included a meeting with Prime Minister Narendra Modi at his official residence, 7, Race Course Road, in New Delhi. Duflo spoke about the book at the London School of Economics on November 5, 2019.

== Reception ==
Publishers Weekly praised the book, writing, "Banerjee and Duflo's arguments are original and open-minded and their evidence is clearly presented. Policy makers and lay readers looking for fresh insights into contemporary economic matters will savor this illuminating book."

Kirkus Reviews gave the book a positive review, calling it "Occasionally wonky but overall a good case for how the dismal science can make the world less—well, dismal."

In his review for The Guardian, Greek economist and politician Yanis Varoufakis praised the book and called it a "methodical deconstruction of fake facts" and an "excellent antidote to the most dangerous forms of economics bashing."

Nicholas Kristof wrote that Banerjee and Duflo "demolish the traditional arguments against higher taxes on the wealthy in an incisive book."

The book has received praise from economists such as William Easterly, Thomas Piketty, Emmanuel Saez, Robert Solow, Daron Acemoglu, Pinelopi Goldberg and Raghuram Rajan as well as from legal scholar Cass Sunstein.

== Publication history ==
- Good Economics for Hard Times: Better Answers to Our Biggest Problems. United States: PublicAffairs. November 12, 2019. ISBN 978-1-61039-950-0. 432 pages.
- Good Economics for Hard Times: Better Answers to Our Biggest Problems. India: Juggernaut Books. November 12, 2019. ISBN 9789353450700. 416 pages.
- Good Economics for Hard Times: Better Answers to Our Biggest Problems. United Kingdom: Allen Lane. November 12, 2019. ISBN 9780241306895. 416 pages.
