= Emily Breza =

American development economist

- Education: Massachusetts Institute of Technology (PhD); Yale University (BA)
- Awards: Sloan Research Fellowship
- Scientific career
- Fields: Development Economics
- Workplaces: Harvard University
- Thesis: Essays on strategic social interactions: evidence from microfinance and laboratory experiments in the field (2012)
- Doctoral advisor: Abhijit Banerjee; Esther Duflo; Sendhil Mullainathan
- Website: https://sites.google.com/view/ebreza/home

Emily Louise Breza is an American development economist currently serving as the Frederic E. Abbe Professor of Economics at Harvard University. She is a board member at the Abdul Latif Jameel Poverty Action Lab, and an affiliated researcher at the International Growth Centre and National Bureau of Economic Research. Breza's primary research interests are in development economics, in particular the interplay between social networks and household finance. She is the recipient of a Sloan Research Fellowship.

== Biography ==
Breza received her BA in Economics and Mathematics from Yale University in 2005, followed by her PhD in economics from the Massachusetts Institute of Technology in 2012. At MIT, she was a student of Abhijit Banerjee and Esther Duflo, co-winners of the 2019 Nobel Memorial Prize in Economic Sciences. After completing her graduate degree, Breza joined the faculty of Columbia Business School, before moving to Harvard University in 2017.

In addition to her academic appointment, Breza is co-chair of the Finance Initiative of the Abdul Latif Jameel Poverty Action Lab, and a Foreign Editor for The Review of Economic Studies. She is also an affiliated researcher at the National Bureau of Economic Research, International Growth Centre, Bureau for Research and Economic Analysis of Development, and Centre for Economic Policy Research. In 2020, she was the recipient of a Sloan Research Fellowship, awarded annually by the Alfred P. Sloan Foundation to support early-career scientists and scholars.

In 2019, Breza was a signatory to an open letter expressing concern over political interference in official statistics in India.

== Research ==
Breza's primary research interests concern labor and financial markets in developing countries, and the impact of social networks on information delivery.

=== Financial markets and technologies ===
In an article with Martin Kanz and Leora Klapper, Breza leverages a randomized experiment in Bangladesh to show that factory workers who receive wages in digital bank or mobile money accounts learn to use the new technology, improving trust in banking, savings, and responsiveness to adverse economic shocks.

In work with Cynthia Kinnan, Breza studies the Indian microfinance crisis of 2010, in which the state of Andhra Pradesh suddenly halted all microfinance activities, reducing the gross loan portfolio of lenders by 20% in just one year. She shows that the sudden shutdown decreased rural wages, in contrast to other evidence suggesting a limited role for microfinance in improving incomes.

In a paper with Arun Chandrasekhar in Econometrica, Breza leverages a randomized controlled trial in 30 Indian villages to show that assigning community monitors to track savings behavior of households increases their effective savings rates by 36%.

=== COVID-19 pandemic ===
During the COVID-19 pandemic, Breza co-authored several papers examining the impacts of information delivery on social distancing and other preventative health behaviors. In a paper in Nature Medicine, Breza and co-authors show that Facebook advertising campaigns encouraging staying at home during the 2020 Thanksgiving and Christmas holidays reduced average distance traveled and subsequent COVID-19 infections.

In related work, she shows that the impact of physician messaging on demand for information on COVID-19 and willingness to pay for masks does not vary systematically between white and black Americans. Breza's research on COVID-19 was supported by a National Science Foundation Grant for Rapid Response Research, on which Abhijit Banerjee, Esther Duflo, Benjamin Olken, and Marcella Alsan were co-principal investigators.

== Selected publications ==
- Breza, Emily, Supreet Kaur, and Yogita Shamdasani. (2018). "The Morale Effects of Pay Inequality." Quarterly Journal of Economics, 133 (2): 611–663. https://doi.org/10.1093/qje/qjx041
- Breza, Emily and Arun G. Chandrasekhar. (2019). "Social Networks, Reputation, and Commitment: Evidence From a Savings Monitors Experiment." Econometrica, 87(1): 175–216. https://doi.org/10.3982/ECTA13683
- Breza, Emily, Fatima Cody Stanford, Marcella Alsan, Burak, Alsan, Abhijit Banerjee, Arun G. Chandrasekhar, Sarah Eichmeyer, Traci Glushko, Paul Goldsmith-Pinkham, Kelly Holland, Emily Hoppe, Mohit Karnani, Sarah Liegl, Tristan Loisel, Lucy Ogbu-Nwobodo. (2021). "Effects of a large-scale social media advertising campaign on holiday travel and COVID-19 infections: a cluster randomized controlled trial". Nature Medicine. 27 (9): 1622–1628. https://doi.org/10.1038/s41591-021-01487-3
- Breza, Emily and Cynthia Kinnan. (2021). "Measuring the Equilibrium Impacts of Credit: Evidence from the Indian Microfinance Crisis". Quarterly Journal of Economics. 136 (3): 1447–1497. https://doi.org/10.1093/qje/qjab016
