= Poor Economics =

2011 non-fiction book by Abhijit Banerjee and Esther Duflo

Poor Economics: A Radical Rethinking of the Way to Fight Global Poverty
- Authors: Abhijit V. Banerjee; Esther Duflo
- Language: English
- Subject: Economics
- Genre: Non-fiction
- Publisher: PublicAffairs
- Publication date: April 26, 2011
- Publication place: United States
- Media type: Hardback
- Pages: 320 pp
- ISBN: 978-1-58648-798-0

Poor Economics: A Radical Rethinking of the Way to Fight Global Poverty (2011) is a non-fiction book by Abhijit V. Banerjee and Esther Duflo, both professors of Economics at Massachusetts Institute of Technology (MIT) and Nobel Memorial Prize in Economic Sciences laureates. The book reports on the effectiveness of solutions to global poverty using an evidence-based randomized control trial approach. It won the 2011 Financial Times and Goldman Sachs Business Book of the Year Award.

== Overview ==
Poor Economics lays out a middle ground between purely market-based solutions to global poverty, versus "grand development plans." It rejects broad generalizations and formulaic thinking. Instead, the authors help to understand how the poor really think and make decisions on such matters as education, healthcare, savings, entrepreneurship, and a variety of other issues. They advocate the use of observation, using rigorous randomized controlled testing on five continents, and most importantly by actually listening to what the poor have to say. Often the answers are startling and counter-intuitive, but make the utmost sense when circumstances are understood. In addition, the universal traps of Ignorance, Ideology, and Inertia often stymie policies and institutions, but may be avoided.

From this empirical approach, the authors believe that the best strategies for eradicating poverty can emerge. However, they resist laying out a broad set of conclusions. Instead they draw some simple yet powerful lessons, and believe that small changes can have big effects. The authors conclude on the optimistic note that we are all part of the solution.

== Authors ==
Abhijit V. Banerjee is the Ford Foundation International Professor of Economics at MIT and a founder of the Abdul Latif Jameel Poverty Action Lab (J-PAL). He is a fellow of the American Academy of Arts and Sciences and the Econometric Society and has been a Guggenheim Fellow. He has also received the inaugural Infosys Prize 2009 in Social Sciences and Economics. He has been featured in Foreign Policy's Top 100 Global Thinkers in 2011. In 2019, he shared the Nobel Memorial Prize in Economic Sciences with Esther Duflo and Michael Kremer.

Esther Duflo is the Abdul Latif Jameel Professor of Poverty Alleviation and Development Economics at MIT and a founder and director of the Abdul Latif Jameel Poverty Action Lab (J-PAL). Duflo has received numerous academic honors and prizes, including the Nobel Memorial Prize in Economic Sciences (2019), the John Bates Clark Medal (2010), and a MacArthur Fellowship (2009). She has also been featured in Foreign Policy's Top 100 Global Thinkers and Fortune 40 under 40.

The two authors married each other in 2015.

== Reception ==
The book has been well received. Robert Solow commented:

"Abhijit Banerjee and Esther Duflo are allergic to grand generalizations about the secret of economic development. Instead they appeal to many local observations and experiments to explore how poor people in poor countries actually cope with their poverty: what they know, what they seem (or don't seem) to want, what they expect of themselves and others, and how they make the choices that they can make. Apparently there are plenty of small but meaningful victories to be won, some through private and some through public action, that together could add up to a large gains for the world's poor, and might even start a ball rolling. I was fascinated and convinced."

Madeleine Bunting reviewed the book for The Guardian, writing:

"[Banerjee and Duflo] offer a refreshingly original take on development, and they are very aware of how they are bringing an entirely new perspective into a subject dominated by big polemics from the likes of Jeffrey Sachs and William Easterly... they are clearly very clever economists and are doing a grand job to enrich their discipline's grasp of complex issues of poverty – so often misunderstood by people who have never been poor."

Nicholas Kristof reviewed the book for The New York Times, writing:

"Randomized trials are the hottest thing in the fight against poverty, and two excellent new books have just come out by leaders in the field. One is Poor Economics, by Abhijit Banerjee and Esther Duflo... These terrific books move the debate to the crucial question: What kind of aid works best?"

Development economist William Easterly reviewed the book for the Wall Street Journal, writing:

"Marvelous, rewarding...More Than Good Intentions and Poor Economics are marked by their deep appreciation of the precariousness that colors the lives of poor people as they tiptoe along the margin of survival. But I would give an edge to Mr. Banerjee and Ms. Duflo in this area—the sheer detail and warm sympathy on display reflects a true appreciation of the challenges their subjects face... They have fought to establish a beachhead of honesty and rigor about evidence, evaluation and complexity in an aid world that would prefer to stick to glossy brochures and celebrity photo-ops. For this they deserve to be congratulated—and to be read."

James Tooley reviewed the parts of the book about education for Econ Journal Watch. Although he was critical of the authors' conclusions in those chapters, he generally praised their overall approach:

Poor Economics "is contextualised with stories of the realities of lives of the poor, with evidence adduced to support or dismiss particular policy proposals. All of the chapters are interesting and challenging...I favour much of their general approach. Experts, I agree, should have to "step out of the office" and get their boots muddy. I'm also in favour of "relying on evidence", and of being judicious, even cautious, with big ideas."

Sanjay G. Reddy in his 2012 article "Randomise this! On Poor Economics" in the journal Review of Agrarian Studies was more critical of the authors approach than many others. He concludes by arguing as follows:

It is, perhaps, not too difficult to understand why the prescription of Poor Economics has enjoyed as much circulation as it has, in particular among metropolitan development policy-making elites, although increasingly also elsewhere. It appeals to powerful but flawed metropolitan predispositions: a desire to "fix" things with simpleminded mono-causal reasoning, allied with the conviction that technology, through the analysis of data using randomised trials, makes it possible to do so. Its technocratic premises, its naïve view of politics and society, and its unselfconscious do-goodism make for a self-affirming picture of the world.11 It is unfortunate that it does so little to explain it.

He also includes a footnote with the attempt at humour One can think of at least three interpretations of the title, not all favourable to the authors..

Poor Economics won the 2011 Financial Times and Goldman Sachs Business Book of the Year Award.

== Editions ==
- Poor Economics: Rethinking Poverty And The Ways To End It, Random House India (25 May 2011). ISBN 978-81-8400-181-5 – India edition hardcover.
- Poor Economics: A Radical Rethinking of the Way to Fight Global Poverty, PublicAffairs (April 26, 2011). ISBN 978-1-58648-798-0 – Foreign edition hardcover.
- Electronic and paperback editions.
