= Nyuntam Aay Yojana =

Proposed Indian social welfare program

The Nyuntam Aay Yojana (transl. Minimum income scheme; abbr. Nyay; a Hindi word meaning "justice") was a proposed social welfare programme by the Indian National Congress in its 2019 general election manifesto. It promised that the party, if voted to power in the 2019 Indian general election, would enact a law under which it would distribute cash to the bottom 20 per cent of India's families in terms of wealth, as a minimum guarantee programme. These households would each receive up to ₹72,000 (US$850) a year, a program the Congress claimed would benefit 250 million people in India.

In May 2020, a reworked version of the Nyuntam Aay Yojana, named as the Rajiv Gandhi Kisan Nyay Yojana (RGKNY; lit. 'Rajiv Gandhi Farmer Justice Scheme') in honour of former Indian Prime Minister Rajiv Gandhi, was announced. Under the scheme, up to Rs 10,000 per acre a year will be transferred into the bank accounts of farmers; the first instalment totalling Rs 1,500 crore was transferred by Chief Minister of Chhattisgarh Bhupesh Baghel to nearly two million farmers during the launch.

== Background ==
The Nyuntam Aay Yojana was proposed as part of the Indian National Congress campaign for the 2019 Indian general election, which primarily focused on agrarian distress while the Bharatiya Janata Party campaign for the 2019 Indian general election focused on infrastructural development and anti-immigration policies. The program was announced on 3 March 2019, at the manifesto's release event at the All India Congress Committee's headquarters at New Delhi.

The scheme was backed by Rahul Gandhi, then-president of the INC, who stated that "the Nyantam Aay Yojana is "an extremely powerful, extremely dynamic, extremely well-thought-through idea"", claiming that it is supported by "the best economists"". According to Bhalchandra Mungekar – a former member of India's Planning Commission and a member of Congress party's manifesto committee, the scheme would redistribute about ₹3.6 lakh crore (US$43 billion) a year. Mungekar stated that the Indian GDP in 2018 was $2.67 trillion, and the promised welfare program of the Congress party, if enacted and implemented, would collect and redistribute 1.9 percent of India's Gross Domestic Product to the poor. He states that the welfare program would be an affordable and just redistribution of national income. According to P Chidambaram – former Finance Minister of India, the proposed welfare program "will not affect other welfare program subsidies India already operates, will constitute 1.8 percent of India's GDP, and benefit 50 million families". (Note: According to the 2018 country report of the International Monetary Fund, the total tax and non-tax revenues of the Indian government in fiscal year 2017–18 was 8.8% of the GDP. An additional 1.8% of GDP for redistribution the Nyuntam Aay Yojana will imply a 20.5% increase in tax and non-tax collections by the Indian government every year, assuming no other pre-existing subsidies and welfare programs in India are affected and the cost of implementing the new plan is negligible.)

== Criticism ==
The Nyuntam Aay Yojana has been criticised by newspapers, politicians and economists on grounds of impracticality and the large expenses of maintaining such a scheme.

According to The Economic Times, the Nyantam Aay Yojana is yet another welfare programme for India, but one that is 'between promising the moon and simply loony'. It will lead to fiscal ruin if existing welfare programmes and food, fuel and other subsidies operate in parallel to the Nyantam Aay Yojana. The program will cost between ₹3.6 lakh crore (US$43 billion) and ₹7.2 lakh crore (US$85 billion) a year, worsen the fiscal deficit of the Indian government, lead to "soaring inflation" and a "flight of capital" from India. To pay for the new welfare programme and maintain India's current deficit level, the Congress party will need to raise GST rate, income taxes and wealth tax. Since the proposed welfare programme would be a cash redistribution without any link to work or jobs, it will create no new jobs and worsen the recent productivity growth India has witnessed". The UK-based weekly The Economist stated that "India already has "over 950 centrally-funded schemes and subsidies", but the benefits of these welfare programmes never reach the poor because it typically lands up in the government officials' pockets and those of the wealthier sections of society who are politically and bureaucratically well connected. Welfare programmes that "prevent participants from doing any other work" are problematic. Another major flaw in Nyuntam Aay Yojana, stated by The Economist is its assumption that the government officials will be able to identify the poor. Given the incentive of government income for being within the poorest 20%, people will likely compete to be poor or appear to be poor so as to avail the benefits".

According to Raghuram Rajan – the former governor of Reserve Bank of India, the Nyuntam Aay Yojana was "good in theory but needs to take into account the fiscal realities of India". The programme details and "how it will roll out" are unclear, states Rajan, and such a programme if implemented properly at the grassroots level can revolutionise things, but "given where we [Indian government fiscal deficits] are, can we add another 7 lakh crore subsidy? The answer is no." Any Direct Bank Transfer scheme, such as the Nyuntam Aay Yojana should aim to alleviate poverty, but to be effective they should bring "more people into productive work force" and they "should not discourage work". James Crabtree – a professor of Public Policy Practice and the former Mumbai Bureau chief of The Financial Times, states that the Nyuntam Aay Yojana idea is not supported by the "best economists" contrary to Rahul Gandhi's beliefs. The idea is a copy of Universal Basic Income idea that is currently fashionable among left-wing advocacy groups worldwide and is innovative compared to past proposals of the Congress party. However, it is unworkable, states Crabtree, in part because it is politically infeasible as it promises to discriminate between the poor by targeting the lowest 20% when similar impoverishment affects far more Indian families. Even if Nyuntam Aay Yojana can politically ignore the impoverished families above the bottom 20%, it is fiscally unaffordable because it would cost about 2% of India's gross domestic product, according to Jamestree. The Nyuntam Aay Yojana cannot end poverty in India, predicted Jamestree. (Note: Salman Soz – a member of the Indian National Congress, has criticized Crabtree's analysis. Soz states that the program is not a Universal Basic Income idea because it is "not universal" and it will only focus on the poorest 20%. According to Soz, while the full cost of the program is 1.8% of the GDP, in practice it will be 1.2 to 1.5% at its peak because his Congress party will start small and will be able to identify the poor. The fiscal impact will be lower because India's GDP will continue to grow and because Congress party's plan is to mandate the state governments to come up with 50% of the cost of Nyuntam Aay Yojana, thus costing 50% to the central government finances. Such welfare programs may boost consumption demand, states Soz, and therefore have a "multiplier effect on the economy". In contrast, according to Ashwini Deshpande – an economist at the Ashoka University, the "current welfare schemes [in India] amount to between 5 and 10% of India's GDP", and the overall cost of implementing the proposed Nyuntam Aay Yojana would be "a similar amount, according to current estimates". It cannot be funded with "the existing system of taxation and [with] the existing welfare schemes intact". According to Guy Standing – it has been beneficial but implemented as not beneficial according to critics. An economist who has been an early advocate of Universal Basic Income, India could implement the welfare program and target the lowest economic segment of its population by using the national Aadhaar card identification system.)

Mayawati, president of the Bahujan Samaj Party and former Chief Minister of Uttar Pradesh, asserted that the Nyantam Aay Yojana was "just vote bank politics" of the Congress party. Abhijit Banerjee, the Ford Foundation International Professor of Economics at MIT criticised NYAY, asserting that "it will only be funded with high taxes and inflation".

== Responses to criticism ==
In response to some of the aforementioned criticisms, the Hindu Business Line argued: "the scheme will require ₹3.6-lakh crore per year. It amounts to 1.9 per cent of the GDP. Now where this money come from? This should not be a big problem.

According to World-Bank and IMF estimates, India’s nominal income in 2018 was about ₹185 lakh crore ($2670 billion), and India was the seventh largest economy in the world. In this situation, 25 crore poorest people could legitimately claim 1.9 per cent as their share in the national income. If the Centre can spend more than ₹1 lakh crore on its 85 lakh employees (45 lakh in service and 40 lakh pension-holders) as per the Seventh Pay Commission’s recommendations; and if the same amount of money is spent towards oil subsidy to reduce the so-called losses of the oil-companies— why should 25 crore people not deserve ₹3.60-lakh crore or 1.9 per cent of the national income?"

The Congress Party stated its goal was nothing less than the abolition of extreme poverty in India: "The abolition of poverty remains the foremost goal of the Congress. We recall with pride that the Congress-led UPA government lifted 14 crore people out of poverty between 2004 and 2014.

It is true that rapid and broad-based growth will reduce poverty, and, in the medium to long term, eliminate poverty. On the other hand, decisive and focused intervention has the capacity to eliminate poverty within a decade. Congress, therefore, sets the goal of elimination of abject poverty by the year 2030." This mirrors the UN's Agenda 2030 while being specific to the Indian Nation.

Live Mint reported on the possibility that some other related schemes could be subsumed by NYAY: "The Congress has hinted at doing away with some subsidies, sharing the cost with the state governments and raising new taxes. The total food, fertilizer and oil subsidies in 2019-20 are expected to be at ₹2.97 trillion, or 1.41% of the GDP. The point is that if the government is carrying out an income transfer to citizens, are the subsidies and many other government programmes really required?"

== Notes ==
Nyuntam is a Hindi word meaning "minimum", and is not to be confused with "NYAY" meaning justice.
