= PublicAffairs =

Publisher

- Parent company: Perseus Books Group
- Founded: 1997
- Founder: Peter Osnos
- Country of origin: United States
- Headquarters location: New York, New York
- Fiction genres: Nonfiction
- Official website: www.publicaffairsbooks.com

PublicAffairs (or PublicAffairs Books) is a book publishing company located in New York City and has been a part of the Hachette Book Group since 2016.

PublicAffairs was launched in 1997 by Peter Osnos. The current Publisher is Clive Priddle. The company publishes mostly non-mainstream non-fiction books about politics and current affairs, both American and international.

It has published several books by Nobel Prize-winning authors, including Muhammad Yunus's Banker to the Poor and Abhijit V. Banerjee and Esther Duflo's two books Poor Economics and Good Economics for Hard Times.

In 2019, it published Shoshana Zuboff's international bestseller The Age of Surveillance Capitalism.

Perseus Books won Publishers Weekly's "Publisher of the Year" award for 2007.
