= Tata Institute of Social Sciences, Hyderabad =

TISS Hyderabad
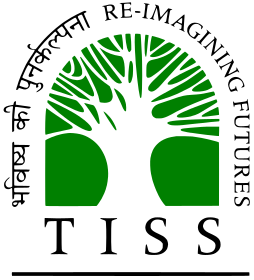
- Motto: Re-Imagining Futures
- Type: Public university
- Established: 2011; 15 years ago
- Founder: J. R. D. Tata
- Affiliations: UGC
- Director: Aseem Prakash
- Location: Nagarjuna Sagar Rd, Brahmana Pally, Turkayamjal, Hyderabad, Telangana, 501510, India; 17.2675577°N 78.615264°E
- Campus: Urban, 100 acres (40.5 ha)
- Website: Official site
- Location within Telangana Location within India

Tata Institute of Social Science Hyderabad, also known as TISS Hyderabad, is a social sciences college located in Hyderabad, Telangana. The Hyderabad Off-Campus of TISS was established in 2011. Hyderabad has today emerged as a hub of Social Science education in South India and the credit for building a reputation of this kind is largely due to TISS Hyderabad. The Institute offers six postgraduate and two PhD programmes that are aligned with NEP 2020.

== History ==
TISS Hyderabad was established in 2012 as an off-campus institution at the invitation of the former government of Andhra Pradesh.

== Campus ==
The current location is in Brahmanapally Road, Turkayamjal, Nagarjuna Sagar Road, Hyderabad. A fully-fledged campus is under construction in 100 acres (0.40 km^{2}) of land in Kothur, Mahabubnagar.

== Perspectives Initiatives (A Platform for Insightful Dialogue on Policy and Social Issues) ==
Perspectives invites eminent academics, policy professionals, and development practitioners to speak on themes related to topical policy and social concerns. As of date, we have hosted more than 90 lectures/discussions under the aegis of “Perspectives”. The perspectives forum has till date hosted Prof. Dani Rodrik ( Harvard University), Dr Nachiket Mor (Ex MD, ICICI Bank, and Ex-Director Bill & Melinda Gates Foundation, India), Prof. Veen Das (Johns Hopkins University), Prof. Bhramar Mukherjee ( University of Michigan), Sudhir Kakkar.

== Inter-disciplinary centres ==
- School of Educational Studies
- School of Gender and development
- School of Public Policy and Governance

== Schools ==
- School of Educational Studies
- School of Gender and development
- School of Public Policy and Governance

== See also ==
- Tata Institute of Social Sciences
- List of institutions of higher education in Telangana
