= Aseem Prakash (scholar) =

Indian academic and public policy scholar

- Occupation: Academic
- Employer: Tata Institute of Social Sciences
- Title: Campus Director, TISS Hyderabad
- Awards: Fell Fund Fellowship

Academic background
- Education: Jawaharlal Nehru University

Aseem Prakash is an Indian academic and public policy scholar who serves as campus director and professor of public policy at the Tata Institute of Social Sciences, Hyderabad. He specializes in research on social discrimination, sociology, and inclusive development in India. His books have been reviewed in multiple academics journals and publications.

== Early life and education ==
Prakash was born in India. He completed his higher education at Jawaharlal Nehru University (JNU), New Delhi, at the Centre for Political Studies. He earned his Master of Arts in Political Science, followed by a Master of Philosophy (M.Phil.) in Political Science, and subsequently completed his Doctor of Philosophy (Ph.D.) in Political Science from the same institution. Following his doctoral studies, Prakash was awarded the Fell Fund Fellowship at the University of Oxford, where he conducted post-doctoral research.

== Career ==
In 2012, Prakash was part of a two-member founding team that designed and launched India's first postgraduate programme in Public Policy at the Jindal School of Government and Public Policy.

Since 2016, Prakash has served as Campus Director of TISS Hyderabad, where he also holds the position of Professor in the School of Public Policy and Governance. As the founding Chairperson of the School of Public Policy and Governance at TISS Hyderabad, he has been instrumental in establishing the institutional framework for public policy education in India.

Prakash has worked for the United Nations Development Programme (UNDP) and the Department of Planning, Government of Maldives, to prepare the framework for the first Maldives Institute of Policy Studies.

== Research ==
Prakash's research focuses on the interface between state and markets, regulation and institutions, sociology of markets, social discrimination, and human development.

== Selected publications ==
=== Books ===
- Prakash, Aseem (2015). Dalit Capital: State, Markets and Civil Society in Urban India. New Delhi: Routledge. ISBN 978-1-138-82253-5.
- Jodhka, Surinder; Prakash, Aseem (2016). The Middle Class in India. New Delhi: Oxford University Press.

=== Edited volumes ===
- Bremen, Jan; Gurien, Isabelle; Prakash, Aseem, eds. (2009). India's Unfree Workforce: Of Bondage Old and New. New Delhi: Oxford University Press.
- Harriss-White, Barbara; Basile, Elisabetta; Dixit, Anita; Joddar, Pinaki; Prakash, Aseem; Vidyarthee, Kaushal, eds. (2013). Dalits and Adivasis in India's Business Economy – Three Essays and an Atlas. New Delhi: Three Essay Press.

== Awards and recognition ==
- John Fell Fund Fellowship, University of Oxford
- Initiated the dual degree MA programme in Public Policy and International Relations, a collaboration between TISS Hyderabad and Macquarie University, Australia.
- Designed and launched India's first postgraduate programme in Public Policy at the Jindal School of Government and Public Policy.
