= Barbara Harriss-White =

British economist

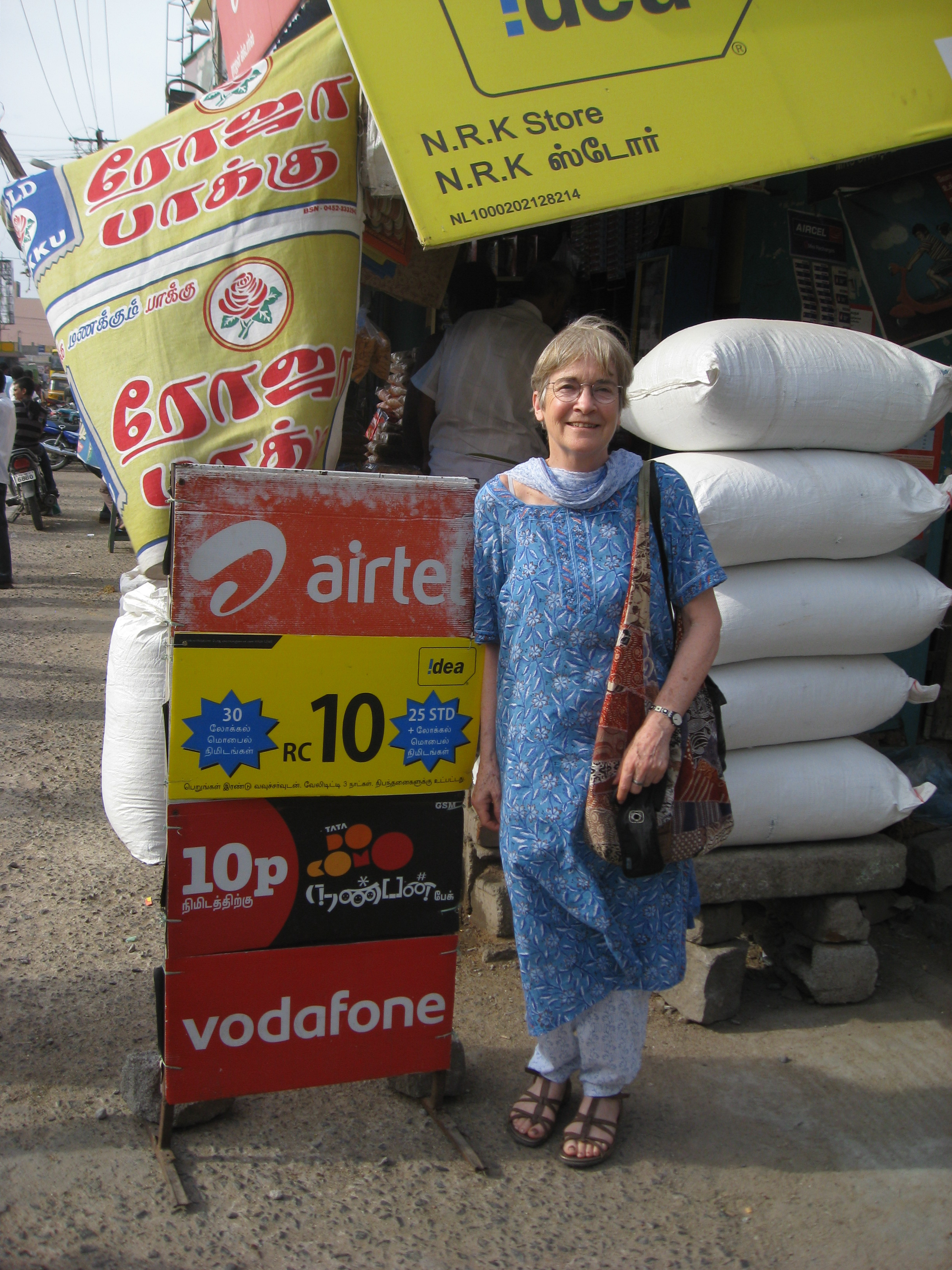
- Barbara Harriss-White in 2012
- Born: 4 February 1946 (age 80)
- Organization: University of Oxford
- Known for: Agricultural economics; Development economics
- Spouse(s): John Harriss (m. 1969; div. 1987); Gordon White (m. 1991; died 1998)
- Children: 2
- Website: southasia.web.ox.ac.uk/people/barbara-harriss-white-0

Barbara Harriss-White (born 1946) is an English economist and emeritus professor of development studies. She was trained in geography, agricultural science, agricultural economics and self-taught in development economics. In the 1990s, she helped to create the multi- and inter- disciplinary thematic discipline of development studies in Oxford Department of International Development; and in 2005-7 founded Oxford's Contemporary South Asia Programme. She has developed an approach to the understanding of Indian rural development and its informal economy, grounded in political economy and decades of what the economic anthropologist Polly Hill called ‘field economics’.

== Early life ==
Harriss-White is the elder of two daughters of British merchant mariner Philip Beeham and Australian nurse Betty Browning. She grew up in London. The new Newstead Wood School launched her to Cambridge where she spent 13 years. After reading geography, she turned to agricultural science and agricultural economics (and dabbled in political journalism, music, Alpine and Himalayan mountaineering). The geographer B.H. Farmer and the experience in 1969 of driving on the ‘overland route’ from Cambridge to New Delhi with John Harriss stimulated a vocation for India, research and teaching.

== Academic life ==
From 1972 to 1979, she worked in Cambridge's Centre of South Asian Studies with a multidisciplinary international team led by Farmer and Robert Chambers comparing the Green Revolution in rice in South India and Sri Lanka. Armed with an American Land-grant university approach to agricultural economics, Harriss-White's 1972-74 fieldwork on grain merchants and moneylenders generated a critical engagement with agricultural economics and a turn to political economy.

From then on, in long-term field studies of rural markets in South India as they evolved over 45 years, in North India over 25 years, and in briefer spells in Francophone West Africa, in Bangladesh and the Himalayan border state of Arunachal, she developed and applied a framework through which to unpack the triple role of rural markets in development. Agricultural markets are simultaneous extractors of resources from agriculture; sites of exploitation of labour and producers; and more or less efficient drivers of agrarian transformations through producers’ responses to their price behaviour. Much of this economic activity is not registered. In 2003, ‘India Working’, a synthesis about the socially regulated ‘informal’ economy and its shadow state, was published by Cambridge University Press and ‘Rural Commercial Capital’, published by Oxford University Press in 2008, on West Bengal won her the Edgar Graham Prize for originality in Development Studies.

In harness with anthropologist John Harriss, she also started the study through business histories of the economy of a small market town. As it grew she – with others – made repeated visits from 1973 to 2013 and it is thought that this long-term urban study is unique. The economic biography of ‘Middle India’, was published in 2016, with 5000 downloads in the first year.

Meanwhile, in 1980 she had joined the London School of Hygiene and Tropical Medicine whose Nutrition Department was then led by Philip Payne. Payne felt the moment was right to embed nutritional competences inside UN agencies in order to judge the human outcomes of all forms of development. Although this did not materialise, the marriage of clinical and social nutrition was very fruitful and this period was formative. Harriss-White added her political economy approach to food systems to the departmental energy invested in the determinants of malnutrition and famine, in the relation between agriculture and nutrition, in intra-household food distribution and gender disadvantage.

In 1987, she moved to Oxford Department of International Development (Queen Elizabeth House) to teach agricultural economics and rural development, alongside her colleague Judith Heyer (with whom she later co-edited two books on capitalist transformations: 2010 The Comparative Political Economy of Development and 2015 Indian Capitalism in Development). At Oxford, she contributed field-based research to the study of the relations between deprivation and India's capitalist market economy: nutrition, the life chances of girls, gender subordination, poverty, ill-health and disability, destitution, ageing, stigma and caste discrimination, incomplete citizenship and the oppressive conditions of waste-work, together with the politics of the policy processes which fail to address these dimensions of human under-development.

In Oxford, in 1993 Frances Stewart was appointed director of Queen Elizabeth House and encouraged to transform it into a university department: the M.Phil. in Development Studies followed in 1996. Since 2007–8, Queen Elizabeth House has been ranked first nationally for its research in development studies. Between 2004 and 2007, during her own term as director of Queen Elizabeth House, Harriss-White co-organised Queen Elizabeth House's 50th anniversary celebrations, supported the consolidation of research groups focussing on social and human development, collaborated in developing an Oxford base for Indian early career researchers, co-organised Queen Elizabeth House's move of site and the building of an extension. She then chaired the first Research Assessment Exercise in Development Studies nationally for the Higher Education Funding Council for England and refused a civil honour. Meanwhile, in 2005, the year when Dr Manmohan Singh, then India's Prime Minister, had received his honorary degree from Oxford, she was asked to set up a multi-disciplinary masters in the study of India, in Oxford's School of Interdisciplinary Area Studies. Starting in 2008, it later appeared this was the first such degree in the world. In this she mainstreamed the multi-disciplinary study of India's environment, again thought to be an innovation in a non-environmental master's degree. In retirement from Oxford, she holds a visiting professorship in the Centre for Informal Sector and Labour Studies in Jawaharlal Nehru University, India, a professorial research associateship at SOAS, University of London, and is an emeritus fellow at Wolfson College, Oxford where she convenes the South Asia Research Cluster.

Harriss-White has advised 7 UN agencies, served on research advisory committees for the British and French governments, for the French development institute, Institute for the Study of Economic and Social Development, the South Asia Institute, Heidelberg, Germany and the governing body of SOAS, University of London.

She has also returned to researching the army of India's self-employed, and the struggles of Dalits and Tribals. Concerned about the difficulty of mainstreaming the ecological crisis into development studies, she has embarked on new Indian field-research on the economy as a waste-producing system and on the political obstacles posed to renewable energy policy and technology. Harriss-White has worked with the British Campaign against Climate Change's ‘Million Climate Jobs’ project and advised the Oxford-India Centre for Sustainable Development at Somerville College, Oxford.

In 2013 she was elected Fellow of the Academy of Social Sciences.

== Personal life ==
Harriss-White has two daughters.

== Selected publications ==
By 2018 Harriss-White co-authored 15 and co-edited 21 books, 138 book chapters, and 121 journal papers.

=== Books ===
- (1979) ‘Paddy and Rice Marketing in Northern Tamil Nadu’, (Madras, Sangam)
- (1981) ‘Transitional Trade and Rural Development’, (New Delhi, Vikas)
- (1984a) ‘State and Market: the Political Economy of Exchange in a dry Region of South India’, (New Delhi, Concept)
- (1984b) ‘Exchange Relations and Poverty in Dryland Agriculture’, (New Delhi, Concept) (authored with G.P. Chapman; W. McLean, E. Shears and E. Watson)
- (1984c) ‘Agricultural Change and the Merchant State’, (Madras, Cre-A)
- (1985) ‘Agricultural Development and Nutrition’ (London, Hutchinson) (major contributor, compiled by Philip Payne and Arnold Pacey)
- (1991) ‘Child Nutrition and Poverty in South India’, (New Delhi, Concept)
- (1996) ‘A Political Economy of Agricultural Markets in South India: Masters of the Countryside’, (New Delhi, Sage)
- (2002) ‘Outcast from Social Welfare: Adult Disability in Rural South India’, (Bangalore, Books for Change) (with Susan Erb)
- (2003) ‘India Working: Essays on Economy and Society’ (Cambridge University Commonwealth Lectures, 1999) Cambridge, Cambridge University Press
- (2004)) ‘Rural India facing the 21st Century’, (London, Anthem Press) (authored with S. Janakarajan and others)
- (2005) ‘India’s Market Society’, (New Delhi, Three Essays Press)
- (2008) ‘Rural Commercial Capital: Agricultural Markets in West Bengal’, (New Delhi, Oxford University Press)
- (2014) ‘Dalits and Adivasis in India’s Business Economy: Three Essays and an Atlas’, (New Delhi, Three Essays Press) (authored with Elisabetta Basile, Anita Dixit, Pinaki Joddar, Aseem Prakash and Kaushal Vidyarthee)

=== (co) edited books and special issues of journals ===
- (1992) (with S. Guhan and R. Cassen) ‘Poverty in India’, (Bombay, Oxford University Press)
- (1994) (with Sir Raymond Hoffenberg) ‘Food: Multidisciplinary Perspectives’, (Wolfson College Lectures, 1992), Oxford, Blackwells
- (1996) (with Gordon White) ‘Liberalisation and the new corruption’, Special Issue of IDS Bulletin, Volume 27, No 2
- (1996) (with T.B. Palaskas) ‘Market Efficiency: Staple Foods in Developing Countries’, (Special Policy Arena), Journal of International Development, Volume 8, No 6
- (1998) ‘Agricultural Markets from Theory to Practice’, (London, Macmillan)
- (1999) (with S. Subramanian) ‘Illfare in India: Essays on India’s Social Sector in Honour of S. Guhan’, (New Delhi, Sage)
- (1999) (with Sugata Bose and Ben Rogaly) ‘Sonar Bangla: Agricultural Growth and Agrarian Change in West Bengal and Bangladesh’ (New Delhi, Sage)
- (2002) ‘Globalisation and Insecurity : Political, Economic and Physical challenges’, (Wolfson College Lectures, 1999) (London, Palgrave)
- (2006) (contributing editor with Elmar Altvater, Colin Leys and Leo Panitch ‘Coming to Terms with Nature: the Politics of the Ecological Challenge’ (London, Merlin Press)
- (2007) (with Anushree Sinha) ‘Trade Liberalisation and India’s Informal Economy: Macro meets Micro’, (New Delhi, Oxford University Press)
- (2007) (with Frances Stewart and Ruhi Saith) ‘Defining Poverty in Developing Countries’, (London, Palgrave)
- (2008) (with Supriya Garikipati) ‘India's Semi-arid Rural Economy: Livelihoods, Seasonal Migration and Gender’, European Journal of Development Research (Special Issue) vol 20, no 4
- (2010) (with Judith Heyer) The Comparative Political Economy of Development : Africa and South Asia (London, Routledge)
- (2010) (with Elisabetta Basile) ‘India’s Informal Capitalism and its Regulation’, International Review of Sociology (Special Issue) vol 20 no 3
- (2013) (with Alpa Shah and Jens Lerche) ‘Agrarian Questions and left politics in India’ Special Issue Journal of Agrarian Change, Volume 13, Issue 3,
- (2013) (with Cyril Fouillet and Marek Hudon) The Field of Micro Finance and Development: Showcasing India’, Oxford Development Studies Volume 41 Supplement (Special Issue)
- (2014) (with Delia Davin) China-India: Pathways of Economic and Social Development Proceedings of the British Academy, 193 (Clarendon Press for the British Academy)
- (2015) (with Judith Heyer) Indian Capitalism in Development (London, Routledge)
- (2015) (with Elisabetta Basile and Christine Lutringer) Mapping India's Capitalism: Old and New Regions (EADI Series, Palgrave)
- (2016) Middle India and urban-rural development: four decades of change (New Delhi, Springer)
- (2018) (with Lucia Michelutti) The Wild East: Criminal Political Economies across South Asia (London, UCL Press)
- (2018) (with Judith Heyer) Indian capitalism in development (London, Routledge)
