= Dipak Banerjee =

Indian economist

Dipak Banerjee (1930–2007) was an Indian economist. He obtained his Bachelor and, later on, his Doctorate from the London School of Economics and taught at Presidency College, Calcutta, where he eventually became head of the economics department. Among his students at Presidency was noted Indian economist Debraj Ray. His wife Nirmala Patankar is also an economist, as is his son, the Nobel Prize winner Abhijit Banerjee.
