= Devaryamjal =

Devar Yamjal
- Village
- Country: India
- State: Telangana
- District: Medchal-Malkajgiri
- Metro: Hyderabad
- Talukas: Medchal

Population
  - Total: 5,000

Languages
  - Official: Telugu
- Time zone: UTC+5:30 (IST)
- PIN: 500078
- Lok Sabha constituency: Malkajgiri
- Vidhan Sabha constituency: Medchal

Devaryamjal is a village in Medchal-Malkajgiri District near Hyderabad, Telangana, India. It falls under Shamirpet mandal. Devaryamjal is one of the biggest villages in the mandal. It is close to Hakimpet village.
