= Asli Demirguc-Kunt =

Turkish economist

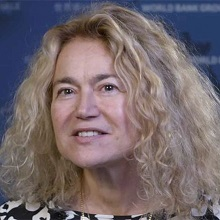
- Born: Istanbul, Turkey
- Education: Ohio State University
- Organization(s): Center for Global Development; The World Bank (formerly)
- Known for: Financial economics Banking; Economic development
- Website: www.cgdev.org/expert/asli-demirguc-kunt

Notes
- Information at IDEAS / RePEc and Google Scholar

Asli Demirgüç-Kunt is a Turkish economist. She is a non-resident Fellow at the Center for Global Development and a former chief economist of the Europe and Central Asia Region of The World Bank. During her 33-year career at The World Bank, she also served as the Director of Research, Director of Development Policy, and the Chief Economist of the Finance and Private Sector Development Network, conducting research and advising on financial and private sector development issues. She has authored more than 100 research papers, as well as books, is widely published in academic journals, and is among the most-cited researchers in the world. Demirgüç-Kunt has been named one of the top 10 women in economics as of June 2015 and one of the top 10 percent of Female Economists for her contributions to the field of economics.

== Education ==
She received her Bachelor of Arts degree from Boğaziçi University (formerly Robert College) in June 1983. In June 1985, she graduated from Ohio State University with a Master of Arts degree in economics. She continued her education at Ohio State University and earned her Ph.D. in economics in June 1990.

== Career ==
=== The Ohio State University ===
- 1983–1988 — Teaching Associate & Instructor, various introductory and intermediate level courses in economics and mathematics, Departments of Economics and Mathematics

=== Federal Reserve Bank of Cleveland ===
- 1988–1989 — Economist, Research Department

=== The World Bank ===
- 1989–2003 — Lead Economist, Development Economics. Joined as Economist, through the Young Economist Program and also held the positions of Senior and Principle Economist before becoming Lead Economist.
- 2003–2005 — Research Manager in Finance, Development Economics, and Adviser, Financial Sector Operations and Policy
- 2005–2006 — Senior Research Manager in Finance, Development Economics, and Senior Adviser, Financial Sector Operations and Policy
- 2006–2013 — Senior Research Manager, Finance and Private Sector Development
- 2010–2013 — Chief Economist, Financial and Private Sector Network
- 2011–2013 — Director of Development Policy, Development Economics
- 2013–2019 — Director of Research
- 2019–Present — Chief Economist, Europe and Central Asia Region

== Awards and Publications ==
While working at The World Bank, Demirgüç-Kunt received the Vice Presidential Team Award in 2010, 2011, 2012, 2013, and 2018.

She has been the president of the International Atlantic Economic Society (2013–14) and director of the Western Economic Association (2015–18) and serves on the editorial boards of professional journals.

Her research has focused on the links between financial development, firm performance, and economic development. Banking and financial crises, financial regulation, access to financial services and inclusion, as well as SME finance and entrepreneurship are among her areas of research. She has also created the Global Financial Development Report series and the Global Findex financial inclusion database. She has co-authored many books in the economics and contributed to volumes in academic journals.

== Selected bibliography ==
=== Papers ===
- “The Determinants of Banking Crises: Evidence from Developing and Developed Countries,” IMF Staff Papers, Vol. 45, No. 1, March 1998 (with E. Detragiache).
- “Law, Finance and Firm Growth,” Journal of Finance, Vol 53, No. 6, December 1998, (with V. Maksimovic).
- “Determinants of Commercial Bank Interest Margins and Profitability: Some International Evidence,” World Bank Economic Review, Vol. 13, No. 2, May 1999, (with H. Huizinga).
- “Institutions, Financial Markets, and Firm Debt Maturity,” Journal of Financial Economics, Vol. 54, No. 3, December 1999, (with V. Maksimovic).
- “How Does Foreign Entry Affect Domestic Banking Markets?” Journal of Banking and Finance, 25(5), April 2001, (with S. Claessens and H. Huizinga).
- “Capital Structures in Developing Countries,” Journal of Finance, Vol. 56 (1), February 2001 (with V. Aivazian, L. Booth, and V. Maksimovic).
- “Funding Growth in Bank-Based and Market-Based Financial Systems: Evidence from Firm Level Data,” Journal of Financial Economics, Vol. 65 (3), September 2002 (with V. Maksimovic).
- “Does Deposit Insurance Increase Banking System Stability? An Empirical Investigation” Journal of Monetary Economics, Vol. 49(7), October 2002 (with E. Detragiache).
- “Law, Endowments, and Finance” Journal of Financial Economics, Vol. 70(2), November 2003 (with T. Beck and R. Levine).
- “Market Discipline and Deposit Insurance” Journal of Monetary Economics, Vol. 51(2), March 2004 (with H. Huizinga).
- “Financial and Legal Constraints to Firm Growth: Does Firm Size Matter?” Journal of Finance, Vol 60, No.1, February 2005 (with T. Beck and V. Maksimovic).
- “Financial Performance and Outreach: A Global Analysis of Leading Microbanks,” Economic Journal, 117: 2007 (with B. Cull and J. Morduch)
- “Reaching Out: Access to and Use of Banking Services across Countries,” Journal of Financial Economics, 85; 2007 (with T. Beck and M.S. Martinez Peria).
- “How well do Institutional Theories Explain Firms’ Perception of Property Rights?” Review of Financial Studies, Vol 21, July 2008 (with M. Ayyagari and V. Maksimovic).
- “Financing Patterns around the World: Are Small Firms Different?” Journal of Financial Economics, Vol 89, No. 3, September 2008 (with T. Beck and V. Maksimovic)
- “Bank Activity and Funding Strategies: The Impact on Risk and Returns.” Journal of Financial Economics, 98(3), 2010 (with H. Huizinga).
- “Formal versus Informal Finance: Evidence from China.” Review of Financial Studies, 23(8), 2010 (with M. Ayyagari and V. Maksimovic).
- “Bribe Payments and Innovation in Developing Countries: Are Innovating Firms Disproportionately Affected?” Journal of Financial and Quantitative Analysis, 2014, Volume 49, No.1 (with M. Ayyagari and V. Maksimovic).
- “What Determines Entrepreneurial Outcomes in Emerging Markets? The Role of Initial Conditions,” Review of Financial Studies, July 2017, Vol 30 (7) (with M. Ayyagari and V. Maksimovic).
- "Measuring Financial Inclusion: The Global Findex Database," "Measuring Financial Inclusion: Explaining Variation in Use of Financial Services across and within Countries" (with Leora Klapper) Brookings Papers on Economic Activity, Brookings Institution, Spring 2013. Retrieved October 11, 2022.
- “Corporate Governance of Banks and Financial Stability,” Journal of Financial Economics, 2018, Volume 130, Issue 2 (with D. Anginer, H. Huizinga and K. Ma).

=== Books ===
- Financial Structure and Economic Growth: A Cross-Country Comparison of Banks, Markets, and Development, Cambridge, MA: MIT Press, 2001 (with Ross Levine).
- Deposit Insurance around the World: Issues of Design and Implementation, Cambridge, MA: MIT Press, 2008 (with E. Kane and L. Laeven).
- Banking the World: Empirical Foundations of Financial Inclusion, Cambridge, MA: MIT Press, 2013 (with R. Cull and J. Morduch).
- The Global Findex Database 2017: Measuring Financial Inclusion and the Fintech Revolution, The World Bank, Washington D.C. 2018 (with L. Klapper, D. Singer, S. Ansar and J. Hess).
