= Sanjay G. Reddy =

Development economist

Sanjay G Reddy is an American development economist. He is a Professor and former Chair of the Department of Economics at The New School for Social Research at New York in the US. His work has covered a wide range of topics including: Inequality; Governance of International Trade and Finance; Social Protection in the Global Context; and Democracy, Technocracy and Learning to Learn (with Charles Sabel).

He is an elected fellow of the Human Development and Capabilities Association.

Despite having tenure at the New School, Reddy was told in 2026 he was being laid off along with 17 other professors. The New School's provost, Robert Kessler, told the New York Times that terminating tenured faculty was permissible because the university was undergoing an overall restructuring, and that the nine full time faculty members in the school's economics department constituted "more teaching capacity than we have need for." The Times noted consternation from other academics over whether the terminations violated the norms of academic tenure. The layoffs prompted an open letter from economist Joseph E. Stiglitz and others calling Reddy's termination "particularly concerning" and charging that at the New School, "[t]he criteria used in selecting faculty and staff for termination have not been adequately explained to the wider academic community."

== Selected publications ==
- Reddy, S. G., & Pogge, T. W. (2002). How not to count the poor! A reply to Ravallion. Debates on the Measurement of Global Poverty, 42–85.
- Reddy, Sanjay G. and Thomas Pogge (2009) How Not to Count the Poor, Initiative for Policy Dialogue Working Paper Series, May 2009
- Reddy, S. G. (1996). Claims to expert knowledge and the subversion of democracy: the triumph of risk over uncertainty. Economy and society, 25(2), 222–254.
- Minoiu, C., & Reddy, S. G. (2010). Development aid and economic growth: A positive long-run relation. The Quarterly Review of Economics and Finance, 50(1), 27–39.
- Reddy, S. G. (2012). Randomise this! On poor economics. Review of Agrarian Studies, 2(2).
