= Edward Mellanby =

British biochemist and nutritionist

Sir Edward Mellanby GBE KCB FRS FRCP
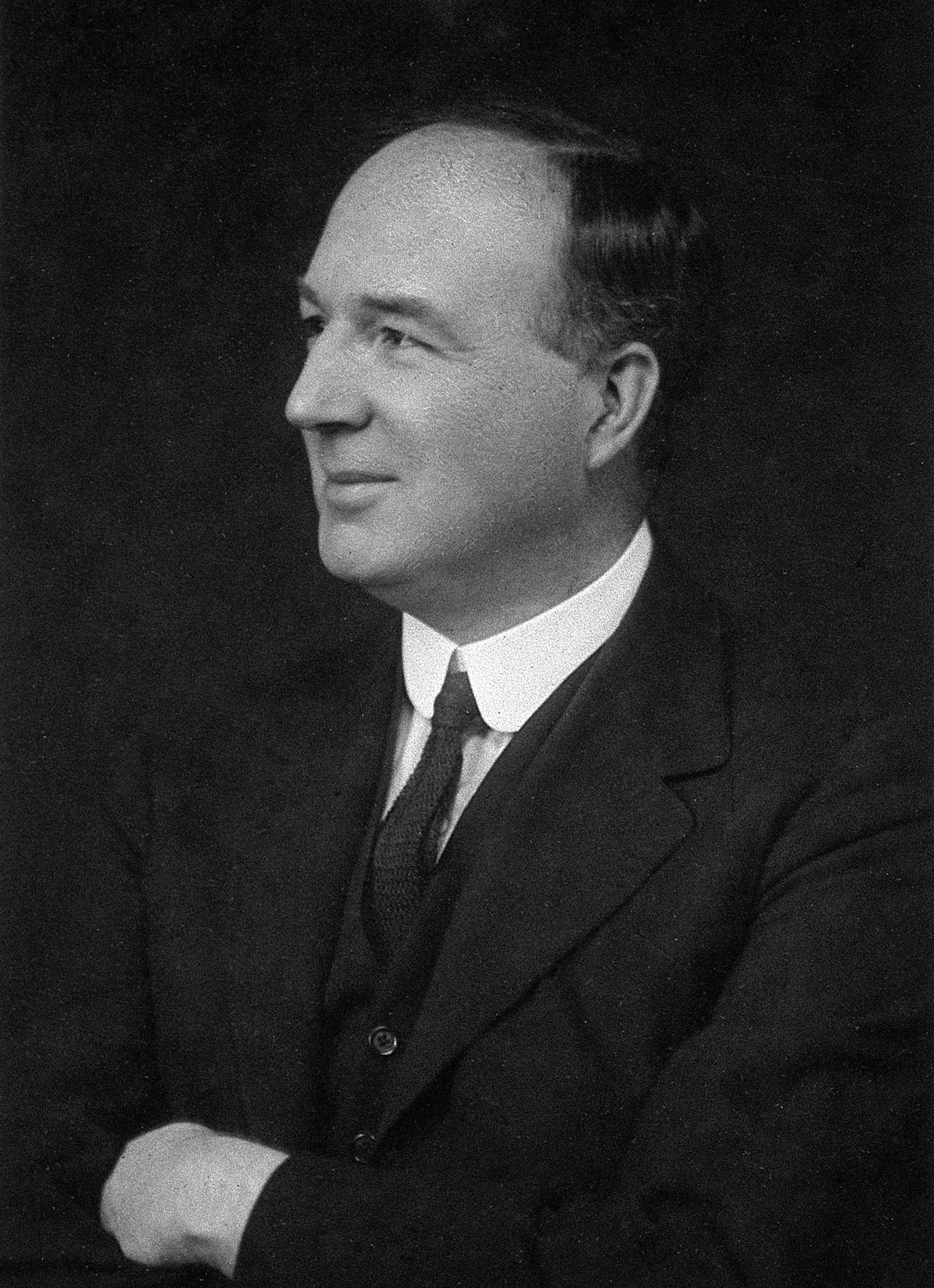
- Edward Mellanby in 1943
- Born: 8 April 1884; West Hartlepool
- Died: 30 January 1955 (aged 70)
- Citizenship: British
- Education: Emmanuel College, Cambridge
- Spouse: May Tweedy (married 1914)
- Awards: FRS (1925); Bisset Hawkins Medal (1929); Cameron Prize for Therapeutics of the University of Edinburgh (1932); Royal Medal (1932); Buchanan Medal (1947)
- Scientific career
- Workplaces: University of Sheffield; University of Cambridge

Sir Edward Mellanby (8 April 1884 – 30 January 1955) was a British biochemist and nutritionist who discovered vitamin D and its role in preventing rickets in 1919.

== Education ==
Mellanby was born in West Hartlepool, the son of a shipyard owner, and educated at Barnard Castle School and Emmanuel College, Cambridge, where he studied physiology.

== Career ==
After working as a research student from 1905 to 1907, Mellanby studied medicine at St. Thomas's Hospital in London, and in 1913 became a medical doctor. He served as a lecturer at King's College for Women in London from 1913 to 1920, during which time he was asked to investigate the cause of rickets. He discovered that feeding caged dogs on a diet of porridge induced rickets, which could then be cured with cod liver oil and concluded that rickets was caused by a dietary factor. It was later discovered that the actual cause of rickets is lack of vitamin D due to lack of sunlight which can be prevented or remedied by ingesting food rich in vitamin D, such as cod liver oil.

He worked on the detrimental effect of foods containing significant phytic acid, particularly cereals.

In 1914 he married May Tweedy, a lecturer at Bedford College (London) who would also carry out research into nutrition and dental disease.

In 1920 he was appointed professor of pharmacology at the University of Sheffield, and consultant physician at the Royal Infirmary in that city. He then served as the secretary of the Medical Research Council from 1933 to 1949.

He was elected a Fellow of the Royal Society in 1925. He was awarded their Royal Medal in 1932 and their Buchanan Medal in 1947.

In 1932, Mellanby was awarded the Cameron Prize for Therapeutics of the University of Edinburgh. He delivered the Croonian Lecture to the Royal College of Physicians in 1933 and the Croonian lecture to the Royal Society in 1943, both on the subject of diet.

He was knighted (KCB) in the 1937 Coronation Honours and made GBE in the 1948 New Year Honours. He was appointed an Honorary Physician to the King in 1937.

== Selected publications ==
Publications include Nutrition and Disease – the Interaction of Clinical and Experimental Work (Edinburgh and London: Oliver and Boyd, 1934). In the work, he writes extensively on vitamin deficiency. He delivered the Harveian Oration to the Royal College of Physicians in 1938.

- Experimental Rickets (1925)
- The Fat-Soluble Vitamins (1933)
- A Story of Nutritional Research (1950)
- The Chemical Manipulation of Food (1951)

Academic offices
Preceded by Grafton Elliot Smith	Fullerian Professor of Physiology; 1935–1937	Succeeded by Frederick William Keeble
