= Human Development and Capabilities Association =

Academic and research society

The Human Development and Capabilities Association is an academic and research society whose aim is to promote the field of human development in general and the capability approach in particular. The Association was launched in 2004 with conferences in the UK at Cambridge and in Italy at Pavia and has run conferences annually since.

The organisation publishes the peer-reviewed journal: Journal of Human Development and Capabilities: A Multi-Disciplinary Journal for People-Centered Development. (formally 2000–8) known as the Journal of Human Development.

== Presidents ==
Presidents of the HDCA have included the following:

- Amartya Sen
- Martha Nussbaum
- Frances Stewart
- Kaushik Basu
- Tony Atkinson
- Henry Richardson
- Ravi Kanburs
- Ingrid Robeyns
- Jay Drydyk
- Melanie Walker
- Enrica Chiappero-Martinetti
