= Turkayamjal =

- Municipality
- Interactive map of Turkayamjal
- Country: India
- State: Telangana

Population (2011)
  - Total: 44,710

Languages
  - Official: Telugu
- Time zone: UTC+5:30 (IST)
- Postal code: 501510
- Telephone code: 08415
- Vehicle registration: TS-07 XX XXXX
- Sex ratio: 1:1(approx) ♂/♀
- Website: telangana.gov.in

Turkayamjal is a Municipality in Abdullapurmet mandal, Rangareddy district in Telangana, India. Tata Institute of Social Sciences, Hyderabad is located in Turkayamjal.

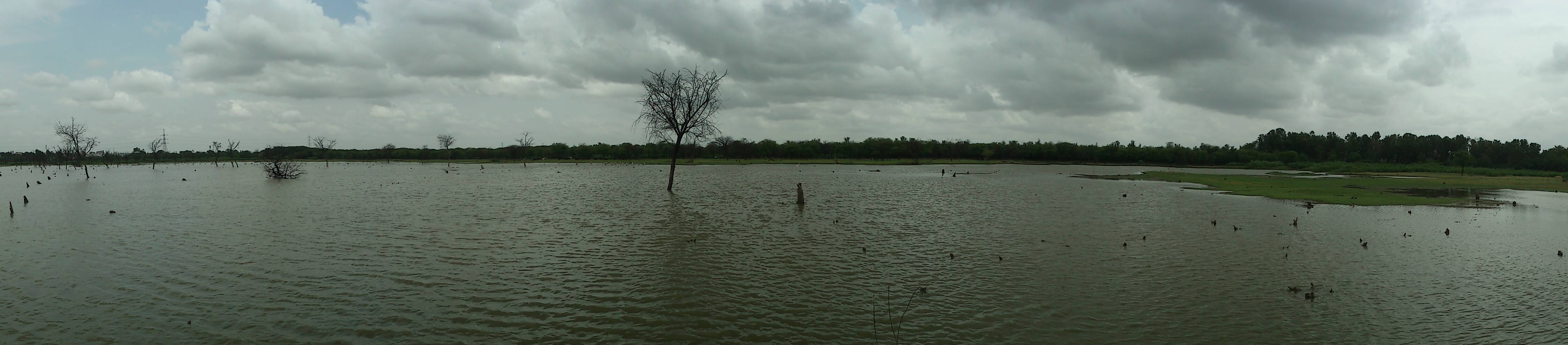
A panorama of the Turkayamjal lake
