= Kala Krishna =

Indian -American economist (born 1956)

- Born: November 26, 1956 (age 69); New Delhi, India

Academic background
- Education: Delhi School of Economics (M.A.); Lady Shri Ram College (B.A.); Delhi University; Princeton University(PhD 1984)

Academic work
- Institutions: Pennsylvania State University (1993-present); Fletcher School of Law and Diplomacy at Tufts University (1991–1993); Harvard University (1984–1991)
- Notable ideas: Economic research in International Trade, Economics of Education, Development Economics, Industrial Organization
- Website: https://sites.google.com/site/kalakrishnapsu/; Information at IDEAS / RePEc

Kala Krishna (born November 26, 1956) is an Indian-American economist, Professor of Economics at Pennsylvania State University, a NBER Research Associate and a CESifo Research Network Fellow. Her research is in the areas of international trade, economics of education, development economics and industrial organization.

== Biography ==
Krishna was born on November 26, 1956, in New Delhi, India. She holds a B.A. in economics (1976) from Lady Shriram College at Delhi University and a M.A. (1978) from Delhi School of Economics. Kala Krishna received her Ph.D. in economics from Princeton University in 1984.

Her academic career started as an assistant professor (1984–1988) and then associate professor (1988–1991) at Harvard University. In 1991–1993, she became an economics professor at the Fletcher School at Tufts University. Since 1993, Krishna is a professor at Penn State.

== Selected publications ==
=== Most cited journal articles ===
As of October 2019, the RePEc ranking of authors of Economics research papers lists Kala Krishna among the top 5% of economists

- Krishna, K., Lychagin, S., & Frisancho, V. (2018). Retaking in High Stakes Exams: Is Less More?. International Economic Review, 59(2), 449–477.
- Krishna, K., & Sheveleva, Y. (2017). Wheat or strawberries? Intermediated trade with limited contracting. American Economic Journal: Microeconomics, 9(3), 28–62.
- Kee, H. L., & Krishna, K. (2008). Firm-level heterogeneous productivity and demand shocks: Evidence from Bangladesh. The American Economic Review, 98(2), 457–62.
- Imai, S., & Krishna, K. (2004). Employment, deterrence, and crime in a dynamic model. International Economic Review, 45(3), 845–872.
- Krishna, K., & Winston, T. (2003). If at First You Don't Succeed...: Profits, Prices, and Market Structure in a Model of Quality with Unknowable Consumer Heterogeneity. International Economic Review, 44(2), 573–597.
- Krishna, K., & Tan, L. H. (1999). Transferable licenses versus nontransferable licenses: what is the difference?. International Economic Review, 40(3), 785–800.
- Krishna, K. (1993). Auctions with endogenous valuations: the persistence of monopoly revisited. The American Economic Review, 147–160.
- Krishna, K. (1990). The Case of the Vanishing Revenues: Auction Quotas with Monopoly. The American Economic Review, 80(4), 828–836. According to Google Scholar, this article has been cited 578 times. ]
- Krishna, K. (1989). Trade restrictions as facilitating practices. Journal of International Economics, 26(3–4), 251–270.

=== Books ===
Krishna, K., & Tan, L. H. (1998). Rags and riches: Implementing apparel quotas under the multi-fibre arrangement. University of Michigan Press.
