= Nabhendu Sen =

Nabhendu Sen (31 August 1944 – 25 September 2008) was born in Kolkata. He was a Bengali dramatist, sculptor and artist.

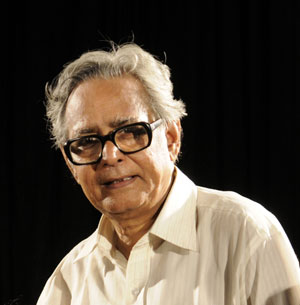
Nabhendu Sen (31 August 1944 – 25 September 2008)

== Early life ==
Nabhendu Sen studied from the Government college of Art and Craft. He joined Nakhatra as a set designer and was attracted towards this medium. He wrote his first drama Nayan Kabirer Pala when he was 24.

== List of drama performed and published ==
1. Nayan Kabirer Pala(নয়ন কবিরের পালা) written in 1968, staged by Nakshatra 1969, Direction: Shamayal Ghosh, published in Bohurupee 1971, reprinted in Bahurupee 1981 and broadcast from Calcutta Doordarshan Center in 1974. This drama was received very well by the critics and is still talked about.

2. Shamabeto Sawal Jabab, written in 1975, staged by Krantikal 1975, Direction: Self, published in Group Theatre 1978

3. Pantomime, written in 1976-1977 (story line: Dibyendu palit), staged by Krantikal 1978, Direction: Self, published in Bahurupee 1980

4. Taalpatar Shepai / Dwijabhumi / Sujan Choukider, written on 1980, staged in 81 by Krantikal, Direction: Self, published in Group Theatre 1982

5. Abhimukh, written in 1983, staged by Shangstab 1984, Direction: Dwijen Bandopadhya, published in Bahurupee 1987

6. Mallabhumi, written in 1984, staged by Shangstab 1984, Direction: Dwijen Bandopadhya, staged by Krantikal 1985, Direction: Dulal Chakravarti " Published in one-act drama collection "Nirbachito Dash" edited by Satya Bhaduri. Mallabhumi has been selected in the syllabus of Extra Departmental Course, Jadavpur University, for the year 2005–2006

7. Prajayini, written in 1984, published in NatyaPatra (Kathakriti) 1998

8. Shatru Sampatti written in 1986, staged by Natyodol 2000, Direction: Sanjeeb Roy, published in Bahurupee 1998

9. Adab (story:Samaresh Basu) written in 1987–1988, staged by Bokaro Natya Academy & Krantikal 1988, Direction: Self, published in Asamayer Natya Bhabna 2000

10. Bhamma, based on Uncle Vanya by Chekov, written in 88, staged by Gandhar 1989, Direction: Asit Mukhopadhay published in SAS Natyapatra 2003

11. Ishtikutum written in 1989 (A part of novel Balidan by Atin Bandyopadhyay), staged by Krantikal 1990, Direction: Self, published in Shudhu Theatre 1991

12. Postmortem, written in 1992, staged by Bokaro Natya Akademy & Krantikal 1993, Direction:Self, published in Group Theatre 2001

13. Archimedeser Mrityu, written in 1993 staged by Krantikal, Direction:Self, published in SAS Natyapatra 2000

14. Tulshi baner bagh written in 1992-1993 staged by Bokaro Natya Academy & Krantikal 1993, Direction: Self, published in NatyaPatra (Kathakriti) 1999 & in the one-act drama collection "Nirbachito Panch " edited by Satya Bhaduri

15. Samapatan written in 1977(as Badhyabhumee) published in SAS Natyapatra 2002

16. Neel mati Lal kankad written in 2004, staged by Mukhomukhi 2005, Direction: Biplab Bandopadhya, published in SAS Natyapatra 2005

== Awards ==
Awarded the prize of Outstanding Dramatist of the year 2000 (Full length) by West Bengal Government on 1 October 2002

== Books published ==
Natyasangraha (Vol. 1) (Books, Hardcover) Dey's Publishing ISBN 978-81-295-1578-0
