= May Mellanby =

English medical researcher

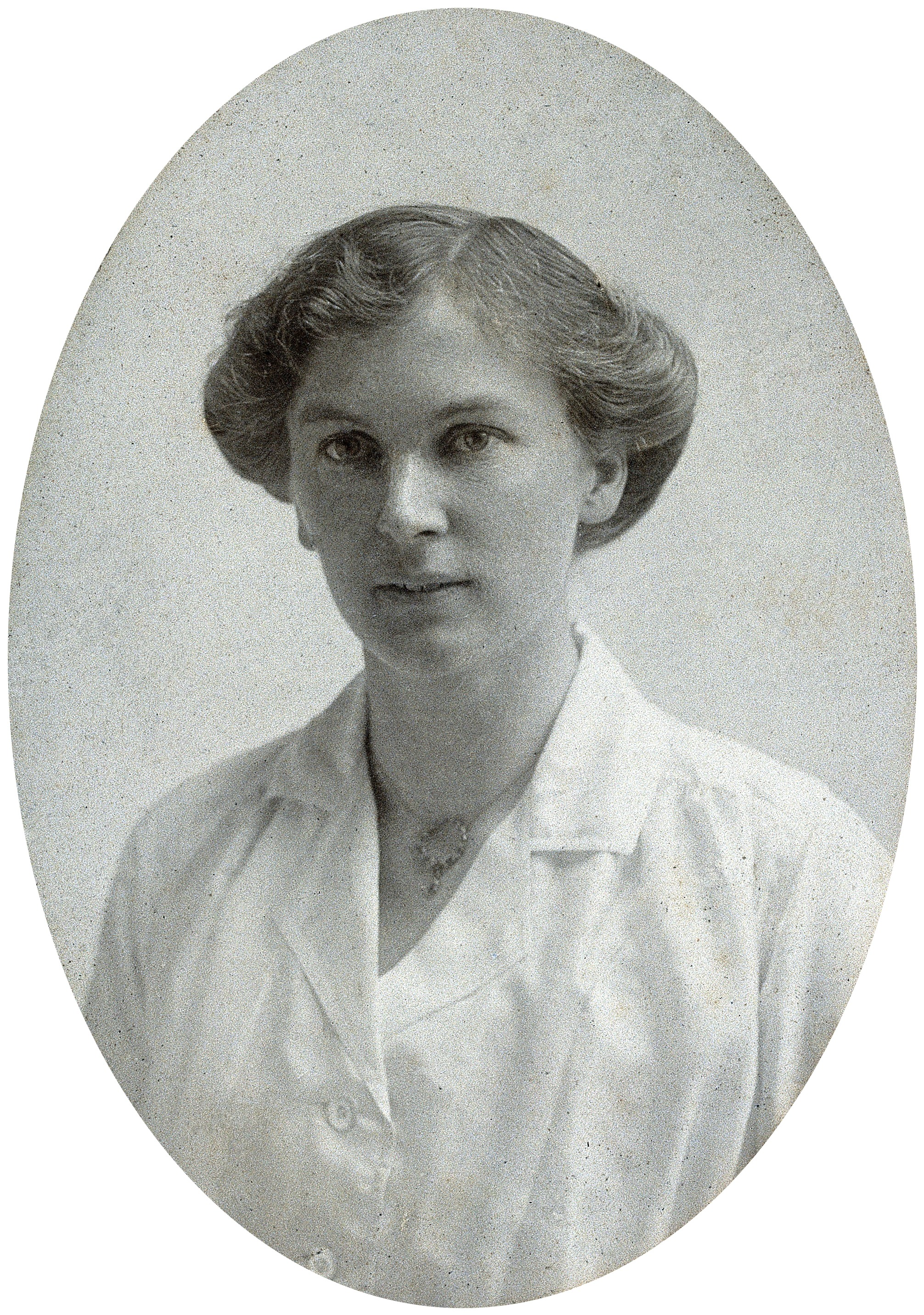
May Mellanby

May Mellanby, née Tweedy (1882 – 5 March 1978) was an English medical researcher, styled Lady Mellanby after her husband, Edward Mellanby, was knighted in 1937. As well as nutrition research carried out with her husband, she conducted independent research into the physiology of dentition and the causes of dental disease. She recommended a diet high in Vitamin D and low in cereals to help teeth protect themselves against decay.

== Life ==
May Tweedy was born in London, the daughter of George Tweedy, a shipowner and businessman involved in the Russian oil industry, and his wife Rosa. She was educated at Hampstead High School and Bromley High School. She studied at Girton College, Cambridge from 1902 to 1906, gaining the equivalent of a second-class in the Natural Sciences Tripos. From 1906 to 1914 she was a research fellow and then lecturer at Bedford College, University of London. There she worked with John Sydney Edkins (who would later become her brother-in-law) on gastric secretion. In 1914 she married Edward Mellanby, then a lecturer in physiology at King's College for Women.

During World War I May Mellanby lectured on physiology at Chelsea Polytechnic and Battersea Polytechnic, and in 1918 she started dental research for the Medical Research Council. She published a series of research papers in the British Medical Journal and the British Dental Journal, some of which were summarised in a chapter on her husband's Nutrition and Disease (1934). She also produced four Special Reports for the MRC.

May Mellanby was awarded honorary doctorates by the University of Sheffield (1933) and the University of Liverpool (1934). In 1935 she and her husband were jointly awarded the Charles Mickle fellowship at Toronto University. She was elected to the Physiological Society in 1956. Some of her papers are held together with those of her husband, at the Wellcome Library, others are held, along with her research collection, by the Royal College of Surgeons of England.

== Works ==
- 'An experimental study of the influence of diet on teeth formation', The Lancet, Vol. 62 (1918). pp. 767-.
- 'Experimental evidence demonstrating the influence of a special dietetic factor on the development of the teeth and jaws', Dental Record, Vol. 11 (1920).
- 'The relation of caries to the structure of the teeth', British Dental Journal, Vol. 44 (1923), pp. 1-.
- 'Effect of diet on the resistance of teeth to caries', Proceedings of the Royal Society of Medicine (Sect. Odont.), Vol. 16, pt. 3 (1923), pp. 74-.
- 'The effect of diet on the structure of teeth. The inter-relationship between the calcium and other food factors', British Dental Journal, Vol. 44 (1923), pp. 1031-.
- (with J. W. Proud) 'The effect of diet on the development and extension of caries in the teeth of children (Preliminary note)', British Medical Journal, Vol. 2, pp. 354-.
- (with E. M. Killick) 'A preliminary study of factors influencing calcification processes in the rabbit', Biochemical Journal, Vol. 20 (1926), pp. 902-.
- (with C. Lee Pattison) 'Some factors of diet influencing the spread of caries in children', British Dental Journal 27 (1926), pp. 1045-.
- 'The relation of caries to the structure of the teeth', British Dental Journal, Vol. 48 (1927), pp. 1-.
- 'The structure of human teeth', British Dental Journal, Vol. 48 (1927), pp. 737-.
- The structure of human teeth in relation to caries, British Dental Journal, Vol. 48 (1927), pp. 1481-.
- 'The chief dietetic and environmental factors responsible for the high incidence of dental caries: correlation between animal and human investigations', British Dental Journal, Vol. 49 (1928), pp. 769-.
- (with C. Lee Pattison) 'The action of vitamin D in preventing the spread and promoting the arrest of caries in children', British Medical Journal, Vol. 2 (1928), pp. 1079-.
- Diet and the teeth : an experimental study. Part 1, Dental structure in dogs, London: H.M.S.O., 1929. Medical Research Council, Special Reports Series, 140.
- Diet and the teeth : an experimental study. Part 2, A. Diet and dental disease. B. Diet and dental structure in mammals other than the dog, London: H.M.S.O., 1930. Medical Research Council, Special Reports Series, 153.
- (with C. Lee Pattison) 'Remarks on the influence of a cereal-free diet rich in vitamin D and calcium on dental caries in children', British Medical Journal, Vol. 1. (1932). pp. 507-.
- Diet and the teeth : an experimental study. Part 3, The effect of diet on dental structure and disease in man, London: H.M.S.O., 1934. Medical Research Council, Special Reports Series, 191.
- (with J. D. King) 'Diet and the nerve supply to the dental tissues', British Medical Journal, 1934.
- The influence of diet on caries in children's teeth, London: H.M.S.O., 1936. Medical Research Council, Special Reports Series, 211.
- (with H. Coumoulos) 'The improved dentition of 5-year-old London school-children', British Medical Journal, Vol. 1, pp. 837-.
- (with H. Mellanby) 'The reduction in dental caries in five-year-old London school children (1929–1947)', British Medical Journal, (1948), pp. 409-.
