= Esther Duflo =

French-American economist (born 1972)

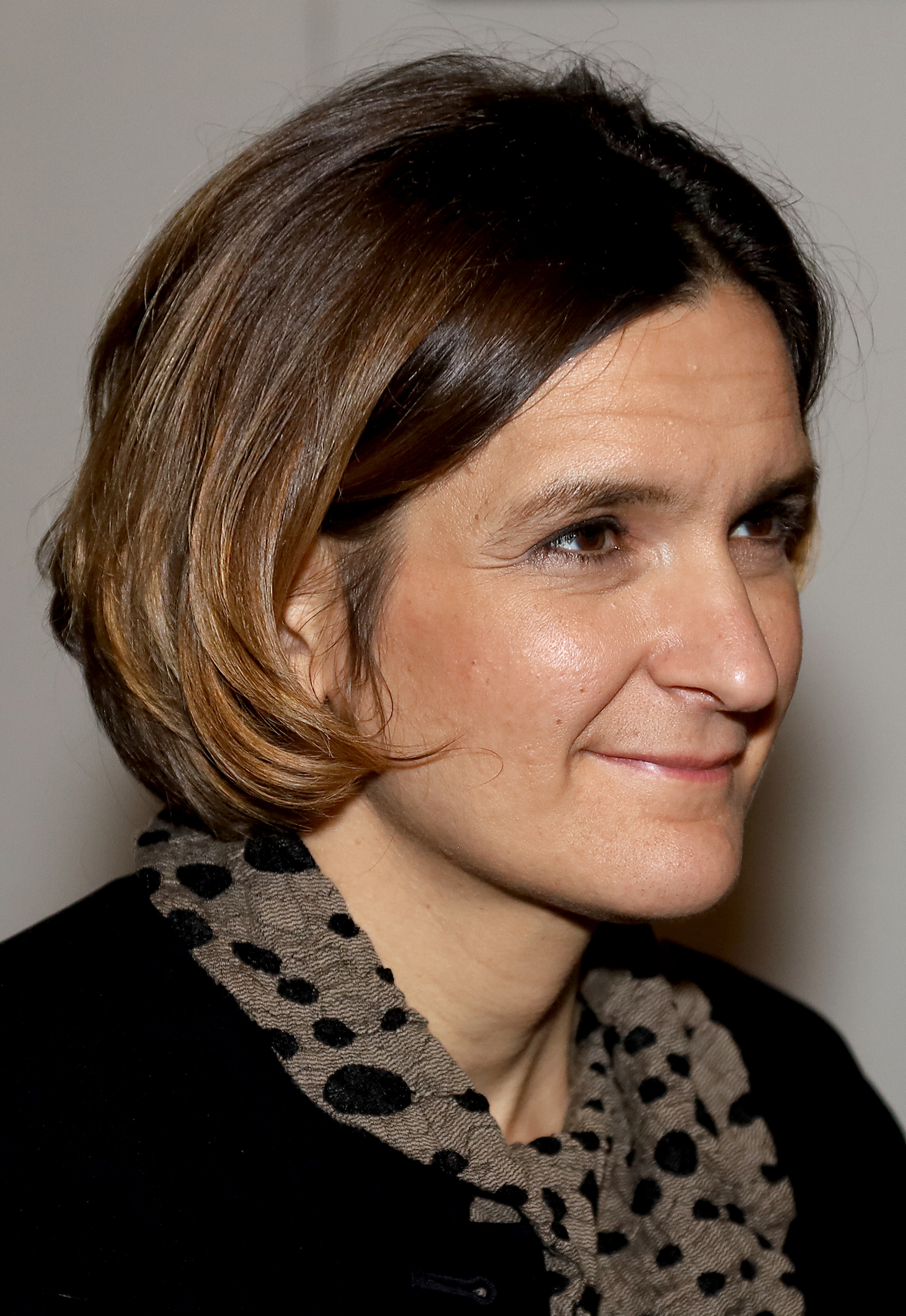
- Duflo in 2019
- Born: Esther Caroline Duflo; 25 October 1972 (age 53); Paris, France
- Citizenship: France • United States (since 2012)
- Spouse: Abhijit Banerjee
- Children: 2
- Father: Michel Duflo

Academic background
- Education: École normale supérieure; Paris School of Economics (Dipl.); Massachusetts Institute of Technology (PhD)
- Doctoral advisor: Abhijit Banerjee • Joshua Angrist

Academic work
- Discipline: Development economics
- Institutions: University of Zurich; National Bureau of Economic Research
- Doctoral students: Emily Breza • Dean Karlan • Vincent Pons
- Notable ideas: Randomized controlled trials
- Awards: Nobel Memorial Prize in Economics (2019); Infosys Prize (2014); John von Neumann Award (2013); John Bates Clark Medal (2010); Calvó-Armengol International Prize (2009); Prix du meilleur jeune économiste de France (2005); Elaine Bennett Research Prize (2002); Golden Plate from Academy of Achievement (2022)
- Website: Information at IDEAS / RePEc

Esther Caroline Duflo, FBA (French: [ɛstɛʁ dyflo]; born 25 October 1972) is a French-American economist, and the Lemann Foundation Professor in Economics at the Department of Economics of the University of Zurich (UZH). In 2019, she was jointly awarded the Nobel Memorial Prize in Economic Sciences alongside her husband Abhijit Banerjee and Michael Kremer "for their experimental approach to alleviating global poverty".

In addition to her academic appointment, Duflo is the co-founder and co-director of the Abdul Latif Jameel Poverty Action Lab (J-PAL), an MIT-based research center promoting the use of randomized controlled trials in policy evaluation. As of 2020, more than 400 million people had been impacted by programs tested by J-PAL affiliated researchers. Since 2024, Duflo has also been the president of the Paris School of Economics alongside her appointment at MIT. In October 2025, the University of Zurich announced that Duflo and Banerjee would be joining the faculty of the UZH School of Business, Economics, and Informatics in July 2026.

Duflo is a Research Associate of the National Bureau of Economic Research (NBER), a board member of the Bureau for Research and Economic Analysis of Development (BREAD), and the director of the development economics program of the Centre for Economic Policy Research. Her research focuses on the microeconomics of development and spans topics such as household behavior, education, financial inclusion, political economy, gender, and health. Prior to receiving the Nobel Memorial Prize in Economic Sciences, Duflo was awarded the Calvó-Armengol International Prize (2019), the Elaine Bennett Research Prize (2002) and the John Bates Clark Medal (2010) by the American Economic Association.

Together with Abhijit Banerjee, Duflo is the co-author of Poor Economics and Good Economics for Hard Times, published in April 2011 and November 2019, respectively. According to the Open Syllabus Project, Duflo is the seventh most frequently cited author on college syllabi for economics courses.

== Early life and education ==
Duflo was born on 25 October 1972 to Violaine and Michel Duflo at the Port Royal Hospital in Paris, France. Her father was a mathematics professor, and her mother was a pediatrician. During Duflo's childhood, her mother often traveled, volunteering for a humanitarian NGO providing support to childhood victims of war. Duflo was raised and attended schools until grade 11 in Asnières, a western suburb of Paris. Duflo completed her secondary schooling in 1990 at the Lycée Henri-IV, a magnet school in central Paris.

After secondary school, Duflo pursued an undergraduate degree at the École Normale Supérieure in Paris, where she specialized in history and economics. She intended to study history prior to beginning her degree, but was recruited to study economics by Daniel Cohen. From 1993 to 1994, she worked as a French teaching assistant in Moscow, where she wrote her history master's dissertation. In Moscow, she worked as a research assistant at the Central Bank of Russia, and as an assistant to Jeffrey Sachs, an American economist selected to advise the Russian Ministry of Finance in the aftermath of the collapse of the Soviet Union. The experience led her to conclude that "economics had potential as a lever of action in the world" and she could satisfy academic ambitions while doing "things that mattered".

She finished her degree in history and economics at École Normale Supérieure in 1994 and received a master's degree from DELTA, now the Paris School of Economics, in 1995. While in Moscow, Duflo met Thomas Piketty, who encouraged her to apply for graduate study at the Massachusetts Institute of Technology. She gained admission to MIT's PhD program in economics, and enrolled alongside her then-boyfriend, Emmanuel Saez, in 1995 after finishing her master's degree. Duflo's first class in development economics was co-taught by Abhijit Banerjee and Michael Kremer, with whom she would later share the Nobel Memorial Prize in Economic Sciences. Her classmates at the time include several prominent development economists, including Eliana La Ferrara, Asim Ijaz Khwaja, and Jishnu Das.

Duflo completed her PhD in 1999, under the joint supervision of Abhijit Banerjee and Joshua Angrist. Her dissertation research leveraged a natural experiment —a large-scale school expansion program in Indonesia — to study the effects of education on future earnings, providing the first causal evidence that increased schooling improves earnings later in life.

== Career ==
After completing her PhD in 1999, Duflo became an assistant professor of economics at MIT, her alma mater. Economics professors are rarely hired from the PhD students in their own departments; however, following the departure of Michael Kremer to Harvard University, the department made an exception to strengthen MIT's development economics group. From 2001 to 2002, Duflo took leave from MIT to pursue a visiting academic position at Princeton University. Upon her return, she was promoted to Associate Professor and became among the youngest faculty members in the department's history to be offered tenure.

In 2003, Duflo was promoted to full professor after receiving competing offers from Princeton and Yale. Alongside Abhijit Banerjee and Sendhil Mullainathan, Duflo secured additional funding as part of her retention offer to found a laboratory aimed at promoting the use of randomized controlled trials in policy evaluation. The Poverty Action Lab was initially led by Rachel Glennerster, a British economist and the wife of Michael Kremer, co-winner of the 2019 Nobel Memorial Prize in Economic Sciences. In 2005, with the support of MIT President Susan Hockfield, the Poverty Action Lab was endowed by Mohammed Abdul Latif Jameel, an MIT alumnus and president of the Abdul Latif Jameel corporation.

In line with Duflo and Banerjee's experience in the Indian context, J-PAL's first regional office was founded in 2007 in Chennai at the Institute for Financial Management and Research. Additional regional offices have since been founded at Pontifical Catholic University of Chile, the Paris School of Economics, the University of Cape Town, American University in Cairo, and the University of Indonesia. As of 2024, the J-PAL network included 900 researchers based at 97 universities around the world. Many prominent development economists are on the board of the organization, including Marianne Bertrand, Chris Blattman, Pascaline Dupas, and Amy Finkelstein.

Alongside her work at J-PAL, Duflo is a Research Associate at the National Bureau of Economic Research, a board member at the Bureau for Research and Economic Analysis of Development (BREAD), and director of the development economics program of the Centre for Economic Policy Research. Since 2023, she has held the Poverty and Public Policy Chair at the Collège de France, and in 2024 assumed the presidency of the Paris School of Economics. She is former editor-in-chief of the American Economic Review, was the founding editor of the American Economic Journal: Applied Economics, and previously was on the editorial boards of the Annual Review of Economics, Review of Economics and Statistics, and Journal of Development Economics.

Duflo has also held several advisory appointments in government. As of 2024, she was a member of the economic advisory committee of the Indian state of Tamil Nadu. From 2012 to 2017, she was on the Global Development Council of President Barack Obama, led by economist Mohamed El-Erian.

== Research ==
Duflo's research focuses on a range of topics in the microeconomics of development, such as health, education, financial inclusion, political economy, gender, and household behavior. Much of her research leverages randomized controlled trials to evaluate the causal effects of social interventions on development outcomes of interest.

=== Education ===
Duflo's dissertation research examined the labor market returns to education through analysis of a unique policy experiment: a mass school construction program in Indonesia. Published in the American Economic Review, the study showed that children exposed to the program (i.e. who were aged 2 to 6 in 1974) received between 0.12 and 0.19 more years of education and had higher wages in adulthood. The paper provided some of the first causal evidence in a developing country context that increased education does lead to increased wages.

Among Duflo's most recognized work leverages randomized impact evaluations to study interventions aimed at improving educational outcomes in the developing world. In 2007, Duflo — alongside co-authors Abhijit Banerjee, Shawn Cole, and Leigh Linden — published a study in The Quarterly Journal of Economics evaluating a remedial education program aimed at improving learning outcomes of those "left behind" in Indian schools. They found that the program substantially improved learning outcomes, in contrast to other interventions such as providing textbooks. Their research has encouraged the proliferation of "Teaching at the Right Level (TaRL)", an educational program aimed at improving learning outcomes by providing targeted instruction to primary school pupils behind on mathematics and reading.

=== Gender ===
In other early work, Duflo examines the role of gender in the intra-household allocation of resources by leveraging another unique policy shock: a large increase in the value of old-age pensions in South Africa in 1991. Duflo shows that in households containing elderly females ("grandmothers"), the increase in pension was associated with an increase in the body mass index of young girls ("granddaughters"). In contrast, she documents no such effect if the only pension recipient is an elderly man ("grandfather"). This result suggests that girls may benefit when a larger proportion of household resources are controlled by older female family members.

=== Microfinance ===
Among Duflo's most cited work leverages a randomized impact evaluation to test the effects of microfinance on household consumption and well-being. The research was a direct response to the popularity of microfinance as a tool to eliminate global poverty, and Duflo's perception that microcredit was being celebrated as a development intervention despite no systematic evidence on its efficacy. Alongside Cynthia Kinnan, Abhijit Banerjee, and Rachel Glennerster, Duflo partnered with a microcredit firm in Hyderabad, India to conduct a randomized controlled trial on the effects of expanding access to microfinance on development outcomes of interest. She found that microfinance may allow some individuals to start businesses or acquire assets, but found little evidence that microfinance caused an increase in overall consumption. The results were received negatively in the microfinance industry, and inspired several follow-on studies of the effects of microfinance in other geographic contexts. In 2019, Rachael Meager — a former PhD student of Duflo — published a meta-analysis of the literature in the American Economic Journal: Applied Economics, finding little evidence to suggest that microfinance raises consumption or encourages household small business creation.

== Personal life ==
Duflo is married to economist Abhijit Banerjee, her longtime collaborator in development economics. The couple met in 1995, when Duflo was a student in Banerjee’s development economics class at MIT, and Banerjee was still married to his previous wife. They have two children, born in 2012 and 2014, and were married in 2015.

== Selected works ==
=== Books ===
In April 2011, Duflo released her book Poor Economics, co-authored with Banerjee. It documents their 15 years of experience in conducting randomized control trials to alleviate poverty. The book has received critical acclaim. Nobel laureate Amartya Sen called it "a marvelously insightful book by the two outstanding researchers on the real nature of poverty." In 2019, she co-authored with Banerjee their latest book, "Good Economics for Hard Times," where she discusses possible solutions to a series of current issues such as inequality, climate change, and globalization.

- Banerjee, Abhijit V.; Duflo, Esther (2019). Good Economics for Hard Times: Better Answers to Our Biggest Problems. PublicAffairs. ISBN 978-1-61039-950-0.
- Banerjee, Abhijit Vinayak; Duflo, Esther, eds. (2017). Handbook of Field Experiments, Volume 1. North-Holland Publishing Company. ISBN 978-0-444-63324-8.
- Banerjee, Abhijit V.; Duflo, Esther (2011). Poor Economics: A Radical Rethinking of the Way to Fight Global Poverty. New York: PublicAffairs. ISBN 978-1-61039-040-8.
- Banerjee, Abhijit Vinayak; Duflo, Esther, eds. (2017). Handbook of Field Experiments, Volume 2. North-Holland Publishing Company. ISBN 978-0-444-64011-6.
- Duflo, Esther (2010). Le Développement Humain (Lutter contre la pauvreté, volume 1 (in French). Paris: Éditions du Seuil. ISBN 978-2-02-101474-7.
- Duflo, Esther (2010). Le Développement Humain (Lutter contre la pauvreté, volume 2 (in French). Paris: Éditions du Seuil. ISBN 978-2-02-101187-6.
- Duflo, Esther (2009). Expérience, science et lutter contre la pauvreté (in French). Paris: Fayard. ISBN 978-2-8185-0007-1. Archived from the original on 5 December 2021.

=== Papers ===
Duflo has published numerous papers, receiving 6,200 citations in 2017. Most of them have appeared in the top five economic journals.

== Awards ==
=== Nobel prize in Economic Sciences ===
Duflo was awarded the Sveriges Riksbank Prize in Economic Sciences in Memory of Alfred Nobel in 2019 along with her two co-researchers Abhijit Banerjee and Michael Kremer "for their experimental approach to alleviating global poverty". Duflo is the youngest person (at age 46) and the second woman to win this award (after Elinor Ostrom in 2009).

The press release from the Royal Swedish Academy of Sciences noted: "Their experimental research methods now entirely dominate development economics." The Nobel committee commented:

Banerjee, Duflo and their co-authors concluded that students appeared to learn nothing from additional days at school. Neither did spending on textbooks seem to boost learning, even though the schools in Kenya lacked many essential inputs. Moreover, in the Indian context Banerjee and Duflo intended to study, many children appeared to learn little: in results from field tests in the city of Vadodara fewer than one in five third-grade students could correctly answer first-grade curriculum math test questions.

In response to such findings, Banerjee, Duflo and co-authors argued that efforts to get more children into school must be complemented by reforms to improve school quality.

Responding by telephone to the Royal Swedish Academy of Sciences, Duflo explained that she received the prize "at an extremely opportune and important time" and hoped that it would "inspire many, many other women to continue working and many other men to give them the respect that they deserve, like every single human being." She also revealed that she wanted to use the award as a "megaphone" in her fighting efforts to tackle poverty and to improve children's education.

French President Emmanuel Macron offered his congratulations: "Duflo's magnificent Nobel Prize is a reminder that French economists are currently among the best in the world and shows that research in that field can have concrete impact on human welfare."

Much of the discussion related to the prize shared by Duflo and her co-laureates focused on their influential use of randomized controlled trials in designing their experiments. Summarizing the research approach which she had utilized along with Banerjee and Kremer, Duflo said simply, "Our goal is to make sure that the fight against poverty is based on scientific evidence."

Duflo came under criticism from the Bharatiya Janata Party, a Hindu nationalist party currently in power in India, due to the party's displeasure over her husband Abhijit Banerjee achieving the Nobel Prize. Many within the party derogatorily commented that Banerjee had been preferred by the Nobel committee over other Hindu academicians, due to him marrying a white European woman (viz Duflo), which was in violation of the Hindu preference for endogamy.

=== Other awards ===
- Duflo was awarded the Elaine Bennett Research Prize by the American Economic Association in 2002, which honours a female economist under 40 who has made outstanding contributions in any field of economic research.
- In 2005, the think tank Cercle des économistes awarded her the Best Young French Economist prize.
- In 2008, The Economist listed Duflo as one of the top eight young economists in the world.
- In May 2008, the American magazine Foreign Policy named her as one of the top 100 public intellectuals in the world.
- In 2009, she was named a MacArthur Foundation Fellow, otherwise known as a "genius" grant. She is also a fellow of the American Academy of Arts and Sciences since 2009. Also in 2009, she was selected as the first recipient of the Calvó-Armengol International Prize, which awarded every two years to a top researcher in Economics or the social sciences aged 40 or younger for contributions to the theory and comprehension of the mechanisms of social interaction.
- She is a recipient of the 2010 John Bates Clark Medal for economists under 40 who have made the most significant contribution to economic thought and knowledge. In the autumn of 2010, she was named to Fortune magazine's 40 Under 40 list. She received her (first) honorary doctorate from the Université catholique de Louvain, on 2 February 2010.
- In 2010, Foreign Policy again named her to its list of top 100 global thinkers.
- She was named one of Time magazine's 100 most influential people in the world in April 2011.
- In 2012, Duflo was picked by Foreign Policy magazine as one of its Top 100 Global Thinkers.
- She shared the 2012 Gerald Loeb Award Honorable Mention for Business Book for Poor Economics with co-author Abhijit Banerjee.
- In 2013, Duflo was awarded the Dan David Prize for her contribution to the advancement of "Preventive Medicine"
- In November 2013, she was honoured as an Officer of the French Order of Merit.
- She received the John von Neumann Award by Rajk László College for Advanced Studies in December 2013.
- In 2014, she won the Infosys Prize in Social Science-Economics for leading "a major shift in development economics".
- She received the 2015 Princess of Asturias Social Sciences award in Spain.
- In 2015, she received the A.SK Social Sciences Award from the WZB Berlin Social Science Center, one of the world's largest awards in the social sciences, which is endowed with US$200,000.
- On 8 November 2019, she received an honorary doctorate from Erasmus University Rotterdam.
- In 2022, Duflo and Abhijit Banerjee received the Golden Plate Award of the American Academy of Achievement.
- In 2026, the American Academy of Political and Social Science selected Duflo for the Daniel Patrick Moynihan Prize, citing her use of research and evidence to inform public policy. She is scheduled to accept the prize and deliver the Moynihan Lecture in early 2027.

=== National honours ===
- Commandeur of the Legion of Honour (2020).
- Officier of the National Order of Merit (2013).
