= John Harriss =

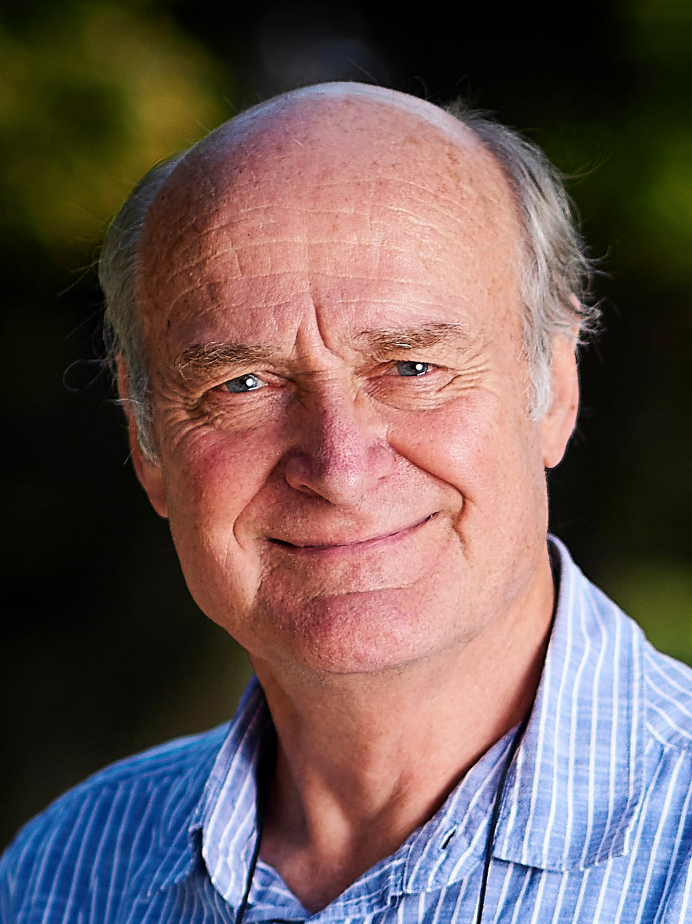
- Born: May 17, 1945 (age 81)

Academic background
- Education: B.A., Archaeology and Anthropology, 1968, Pembroke College, Cambridge; PhD., Development Studies, University of East Anglia
- Thesis: Capitalism and peasant farming: a study of agricultural change and agrarian structure in northern Tamil Nadu. (1977)

Academic work
- Discipline: Development Studies
- Institutions: University of East Anglia; London School of Economics; Simon Fraser University

John Charles Harriss FRSC (born England, 1945) is an emeritus professor of international studies at Simon Fraser University, visiting faculty at the London School of Economics and Professorial Associate at SOAS. In 2017, Harris was elected a Fellow of the Royal Society of Canada.

== Career ==
After earning his PhD, Harriss taught at the University of East Anglia and became the Dean of the School of Development Studies in 1987. In the early 1990s he joined the faculty of London School of Economics as Programme Director in Development Studies, in what was to become DESTIN, a postgraduate institute (now a Department) As Programme Director, he also was a managing editor of the Journal of Development Studies from 1999 until 2004.

Harriss stayed at the London School of Economics until 2007, when he moved to Vancouver to become Simon Fraser University's (SFU) Director of the School of International Studies. Harriss eventually stepped down as Director in 2012. He also became Editor-in- Chief of the Canadian Journal of Development Studies from 2010 until 2014.

In 2017, Harriss was one of three professors from SFU to be elected a Fellow of the Royal Society of Canada.

== Publications ==
- 1982 Capitalism and Peasant Farming: agrarian structure and ideology in northern Tamil Nadu. Oxford University Press.
- 1984 (eds. with Mick Moore) Development and the rural-urban divide. Routledge.
- 1990 (with K P Kannan and G Rodgers) Urban Labour Market Structure and Job Access in India: a study of Coimbatore. International Institute of Labour Studies, Geneva.
- 1992 (ed.) Rural Development: theories of peasant economy and agrarian change. Hutchinson. ISBN 0091447917
- 1995 The New Institutional Economics and Third World Development. London: Routledge (edited with Janet Hunter and Colin Lewis)
- 1995 The Politics of Humanitarian Intervention. London: Pinter (edited)
- 1999 Managing Development: Understanding Inter-Organisational Relationships. London: Sage Publications and the Open University (edited, with Tom Hewitt and Dorcas Robinson)
- 2000 Reinventing India: Liberalization, Hindu Nationalism and Popular Democracy. Cambridge: Polity Press; and Delhi: Oxford University Press (with Stuart Corbridge).
- 2001/2002 Depoliticizing Development: the World Bank and Social Capital. Delhi: LeftWord, UK and US Editions London: Anthem Press 2002.
- 2006 Power Matters: Essays on Institutions, Politics and Society in India. Delhi: Oxford University Press.
- 2004 Politicising Democracy: Local Politics and Democratisation in Developing Countries (editor, with Kristian Stokke and Olle Tornquist). London: Palgrave Macmillan (also published in Bahasa Indonesia as Politasi Demokrasi: Politik Lokal Baru. Jakarta: Lembaga Kajian Demokrasi dan Hak Asasi)
- 2008 (with Barbara Harriss-White) Green Revolution and After: Studies in the Political Economy of Rural Development in South India. London: Anthem Press. ISBN 9781843311423
- 2010 Globalization and Labour in China and India: Impacts and Responses (editor, with Paul Bowles). London: Palgrave MacMillan
- 2011 Understanding India’s New Political Economy: A Great Transformation? (edited, with Sanjay Ruparelia, Sanjay Reddy and Stuart Corbridge) London and New York: Routledge
- 2013 India Today: Economy, Politics and Society (with Stuart Corbridge and Craig Jeffrey). Cambridge: Polity Press/ Oxford University Press, Delhi
- 2014 Keywords for Modern India (with Craig Jeffrey). Oxford: Oxford University Press.
- 2016 Reinventing Social Democratic Development: Insights from Indian and Scandinavian Comparisons (eds. with Olle Törnquist). Copenhagen, Nordic Institute of Asian Studies Press. (draft chapter here)
