= InterContinental Grand Stanford Hong Kong =

Luxury hotel in Hong Kong

- Chinese: 海景嘉福洲際酒店

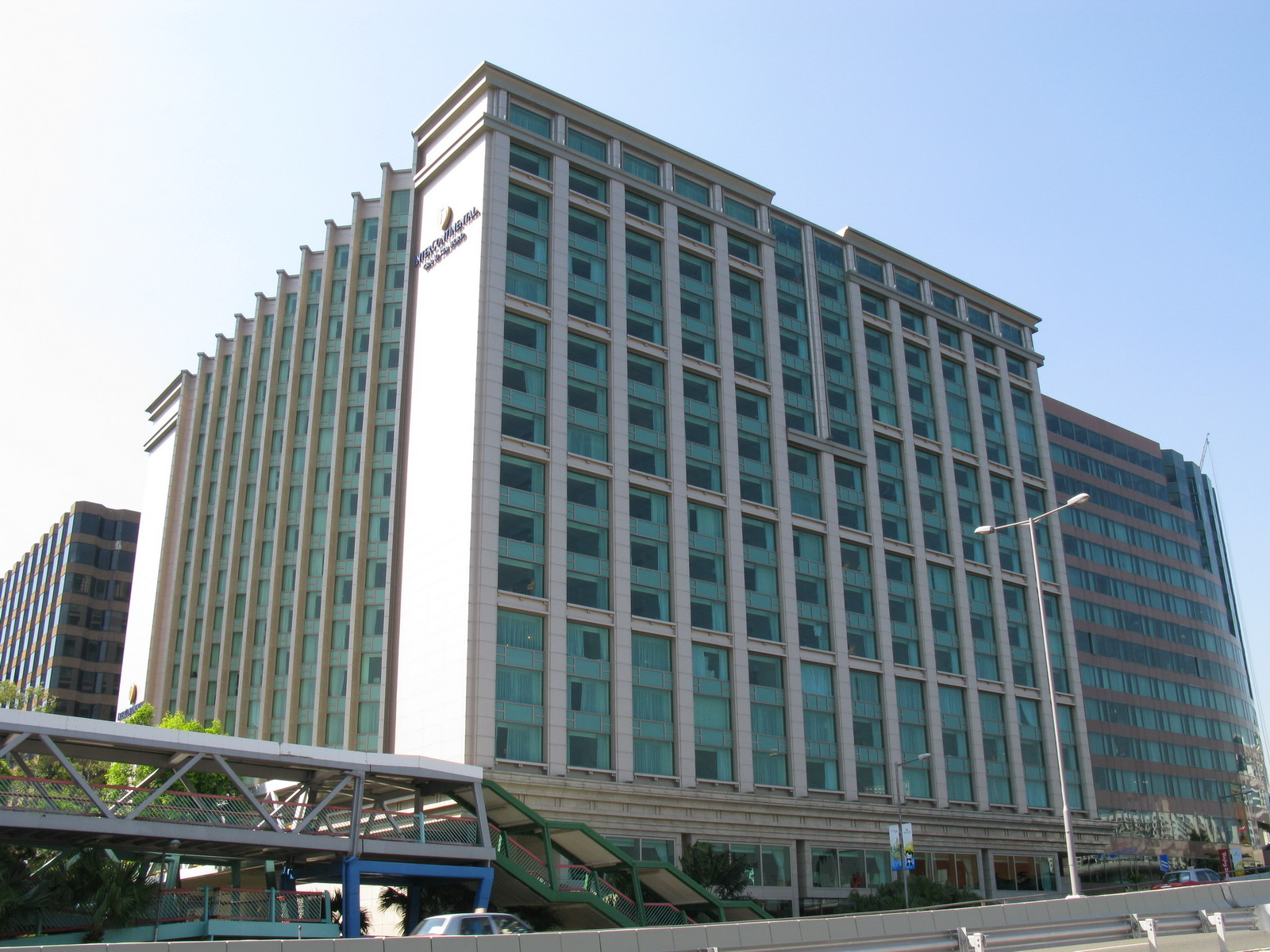
- Hotel exterior

- Location within Hong Kong urban core
- Former names: Holiday Inn Harbour View
- Hotel chain: InterContinental

General information
- Location: Hong Kong, 70 Mody Road, Tsim Sha Tsui
- Coordinates: 22°17′56.61″N 114°10′45.65″E
- Opening: 18 September 1981; 44 years ago
- Operator: IHG Hotels & Resorts

Technical details
- Floor count: 18

Design and construction
- Architecture firm: Wong & Ouyang
- Developer: K. Wah Group

Other information
- Number of rooms: 572
- Number of restaurants: 4

Website
- www.hongkong.intercontinental.com

InterContinental Grand Stanford Hong Kong
- Traditional Chinese: 海景嘉福洲際酒店
Transcriptions
Yue: Cantonese
- Yale Romanization: Hói gíng gā fūk jāu jai jáu dim
- Jyutping: Hoi^{2} ging^{2} gaa^{1} fuk^{1} zau^{1} zai^{3} zau^{2} dim^{3}

InterContinental Grand Stanford Hong Kong is a five-star luxury hotel located in Tsim Sha Tsui, Kowloon, Hong Kong. It is under the InterContinental hotel brand that is managed by IHG Hotels & Resorts.

== History ==
In 1979, Hong Kong tycoon Lui Che Woo of K. Wah Group partnered with Holiday Inn to build his first hotel in Hong Kong for HK$300 million. The hotel was originally named Holiday Inn Harbour View.

By the 1990s, the hotel was valued at more than HK$1 billion and became K. Wah Group's flagship hotel.

Later on the hotel was sold to IHG Hotels & Resorts and was rebranded to InterContinental Grand Stanford Hong Kong.

The hotel has been regularly used to host the delegation of Chinese Olympic Games athletes during their visits to Hong Kong.

== Gallery ==
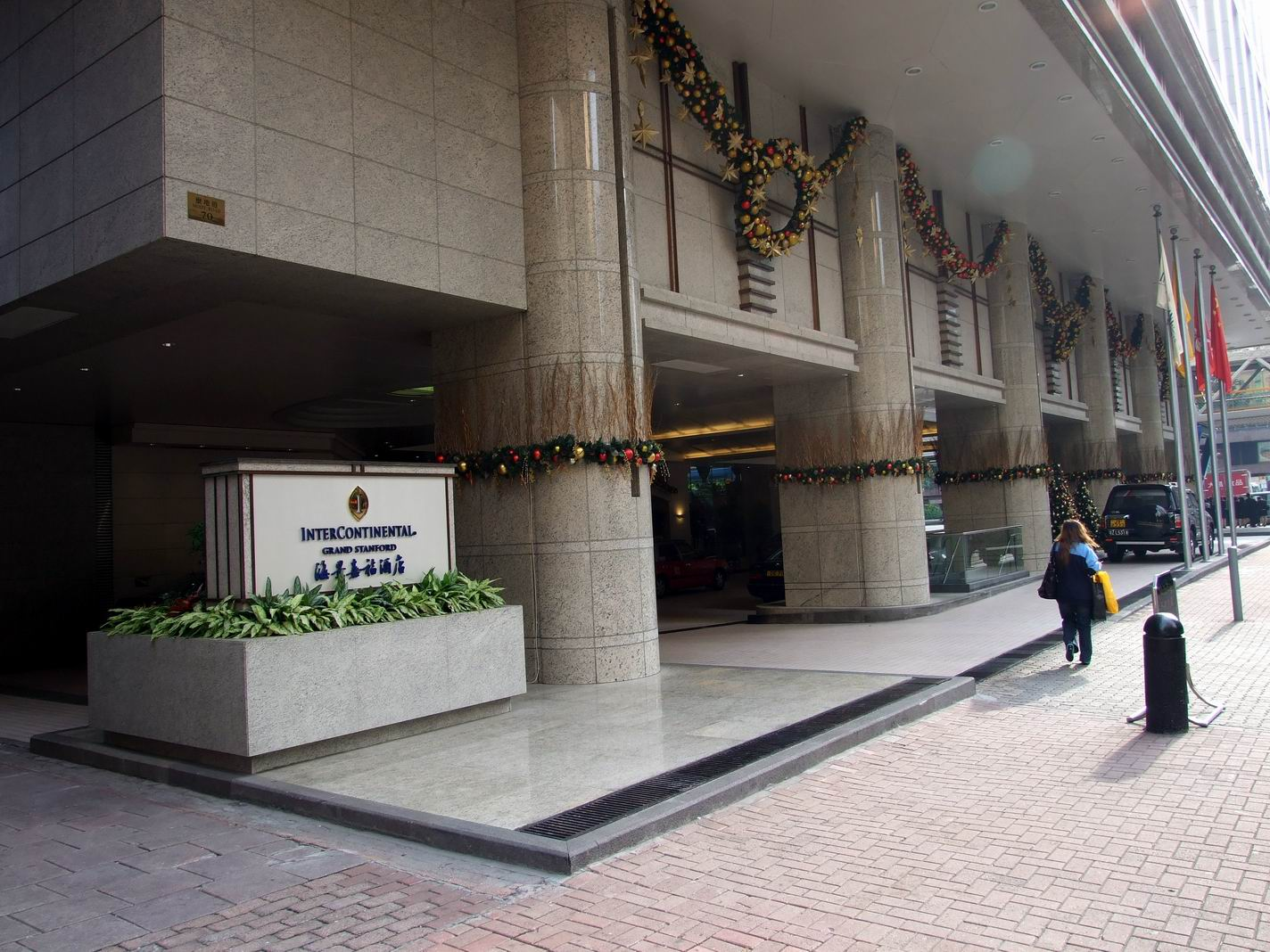
Entrance

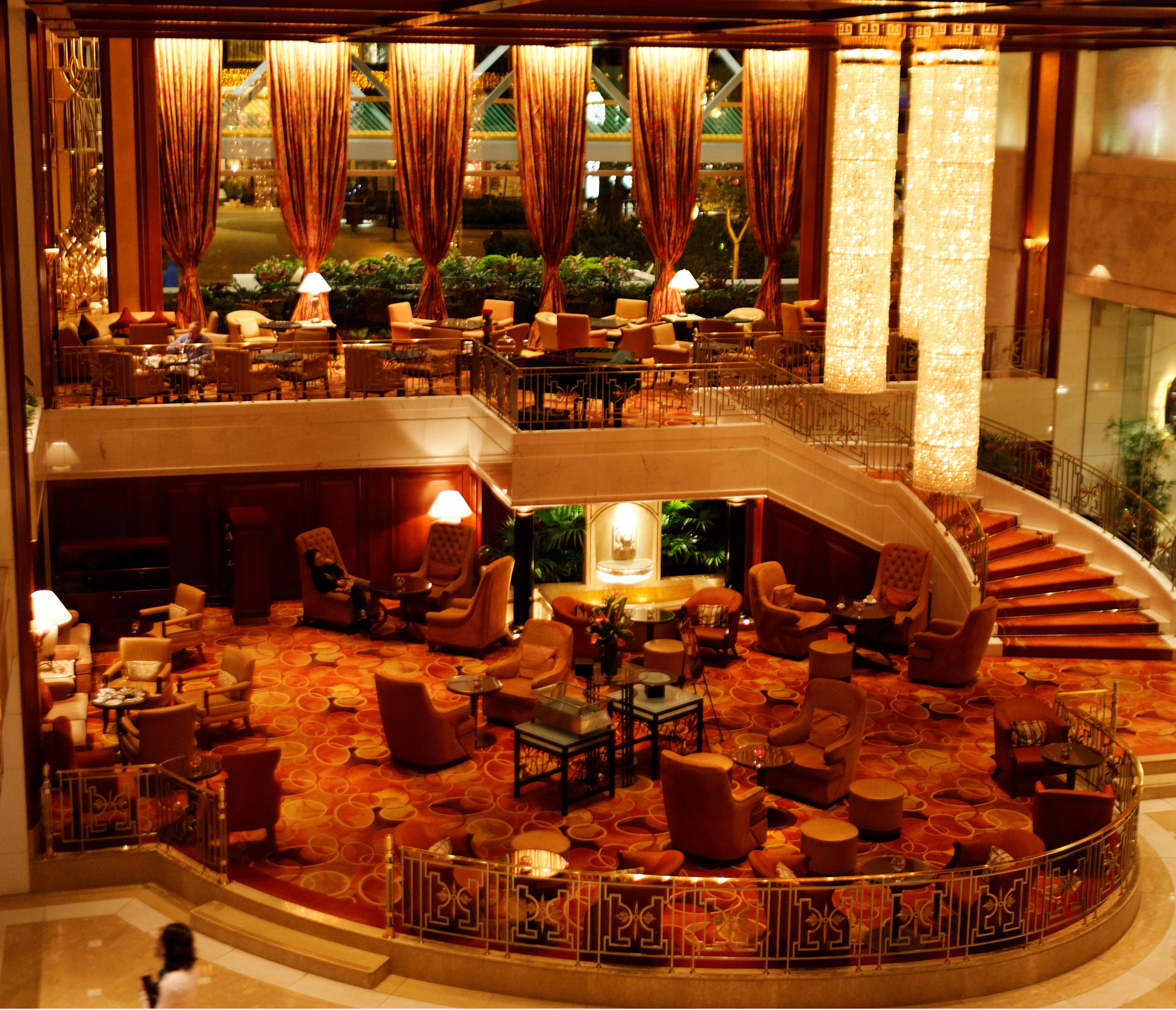
Lobby

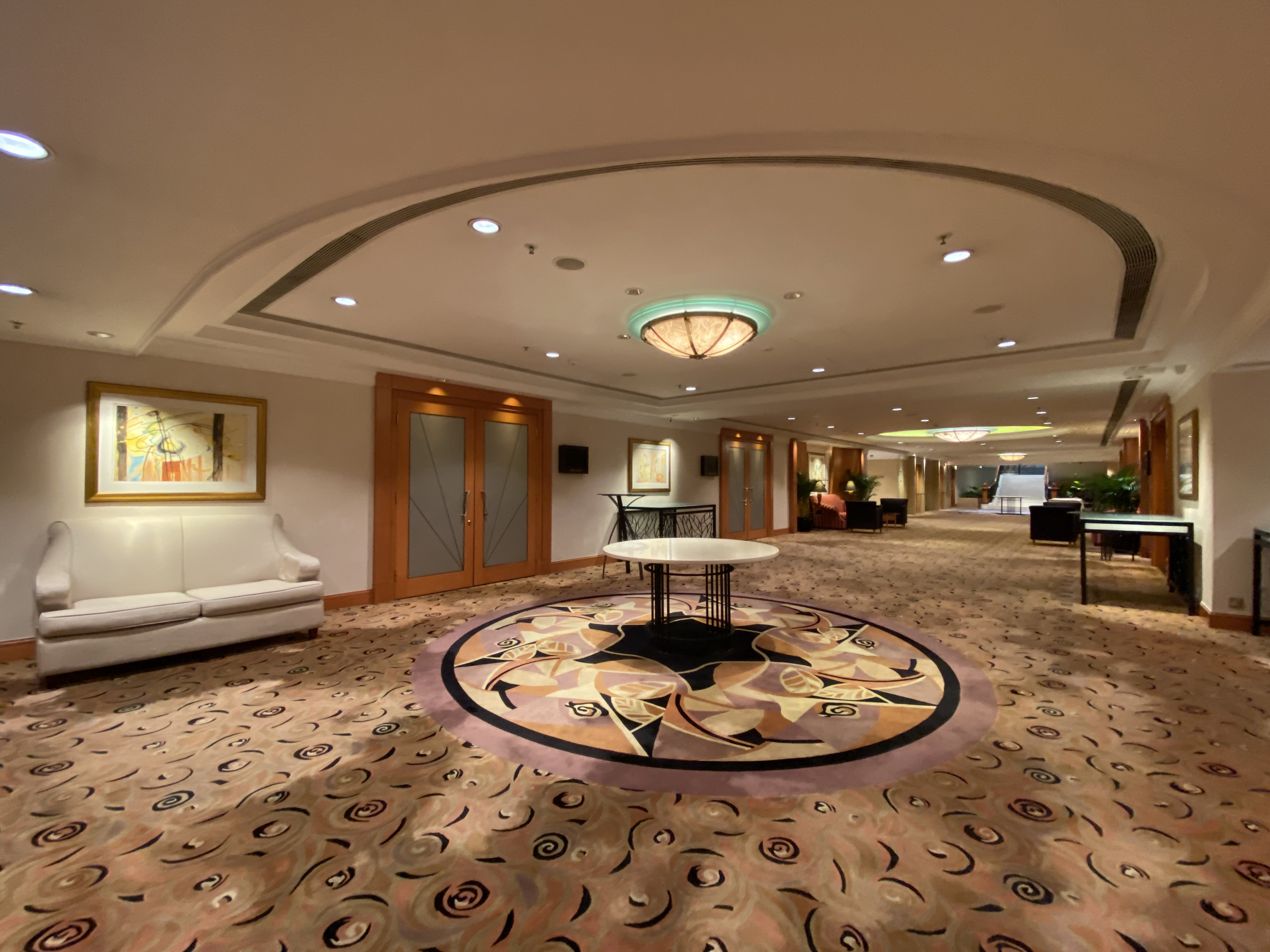
B1 Ballroom access

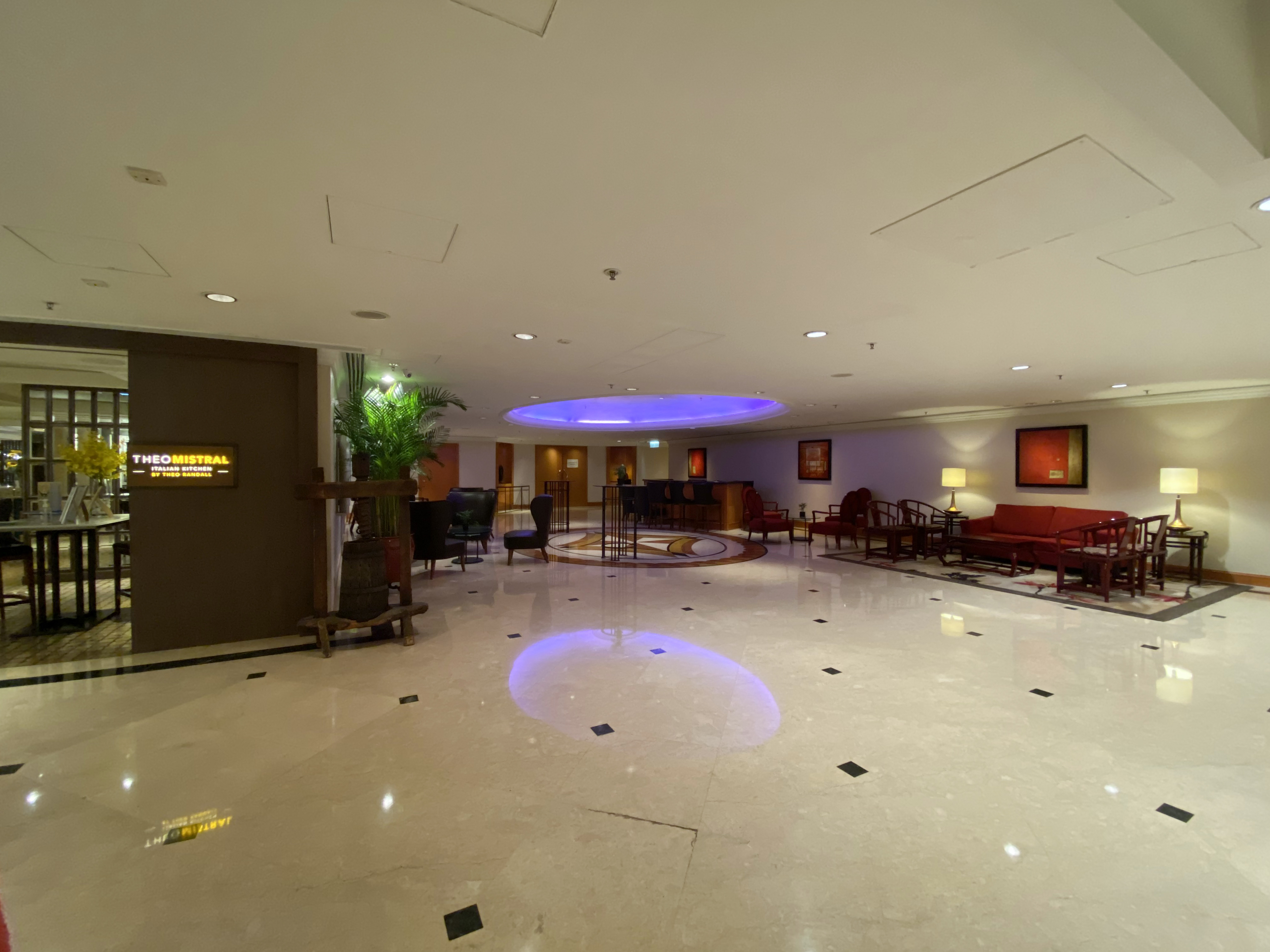
B2 level

== See also ==
- Rosewood Hong Kong
- Regent Hong Kong
