= Impact of microcredit =

Consequences of very small loans

The impact of microcredit is the study of microcredit and its impact on poverty reduction which is a subject of much controversy. Proponents state that it reduces poverty through higher employment and higher incomes. This is expected to lead to improved nutrition and improved education of the borrowers' children. Some argue that microcredit empowers women. In the US and Canada, it is argued that microcredit helps recipients to graduate from welfare programs. Critics say that microcredit has not increased incomes, but has driven poor households into a debt trap, in some cases even leading to suicide. They add that the money from loans is often used for durable consumer goods or consumption instead of being used for productive investments, that it fails to empower women, and that it has not improved health or education.

The available evidence indicates that in many cases microcredit has facilitated the creation and the growth of businesses. It has often generated self-employment, but it has not necessarily increased incomes after interest payments. In some cases it has driven borrowers into debt traps. In addition, it can produce unintended rent-seeking entrepreneurship. There is no evidence that microcredit has empowered women. In short, microcredit has achieved much less than what its proponents said it would achieve, but its negative impacts have not been as drastic as some critics have argued. Microcredit is just one factor influencing the success of a small businesses, whose success is influenced to a much larger extent by how much an economy or a particular market grows. A critical review of 58 papers covering experiences in 18 countries concluded "there is no good evidence for the beneficent impact of microfinance on the well-being of poor people" and that "the greatest impacts are reported by studies with the weakest designs".

The attempt to objectively evaluate the impact of microcredit on a global or a local scale is marred by numerous methodological challenges. There are only few rigorous evaluations of microcredit, and much of the literature on the impact of microcredit is based in anecdotal reports or case studies that are not representative. Even among the rigorous evaluations many "suffer from weak methodologies and inadequate data", according to a systematic literature review of the impact of microcredit conducted in 2011 by a group of researchers on behalf of UKAid. A 2008 review of over 100 articles on microcredit found that only 6 used enough quantitative data to be representative, and none employed rigorous methods such as randomized control trials. Rigorous impact evaluations using control and treatment groups are difficult to undertake today, because microcredit is so common in developing countries today that few locations remain where such a research setting can still be applied. Further complicating impact studies is the often highly politicized context of poverty alleviation initiatives.

== Income and poverty ==
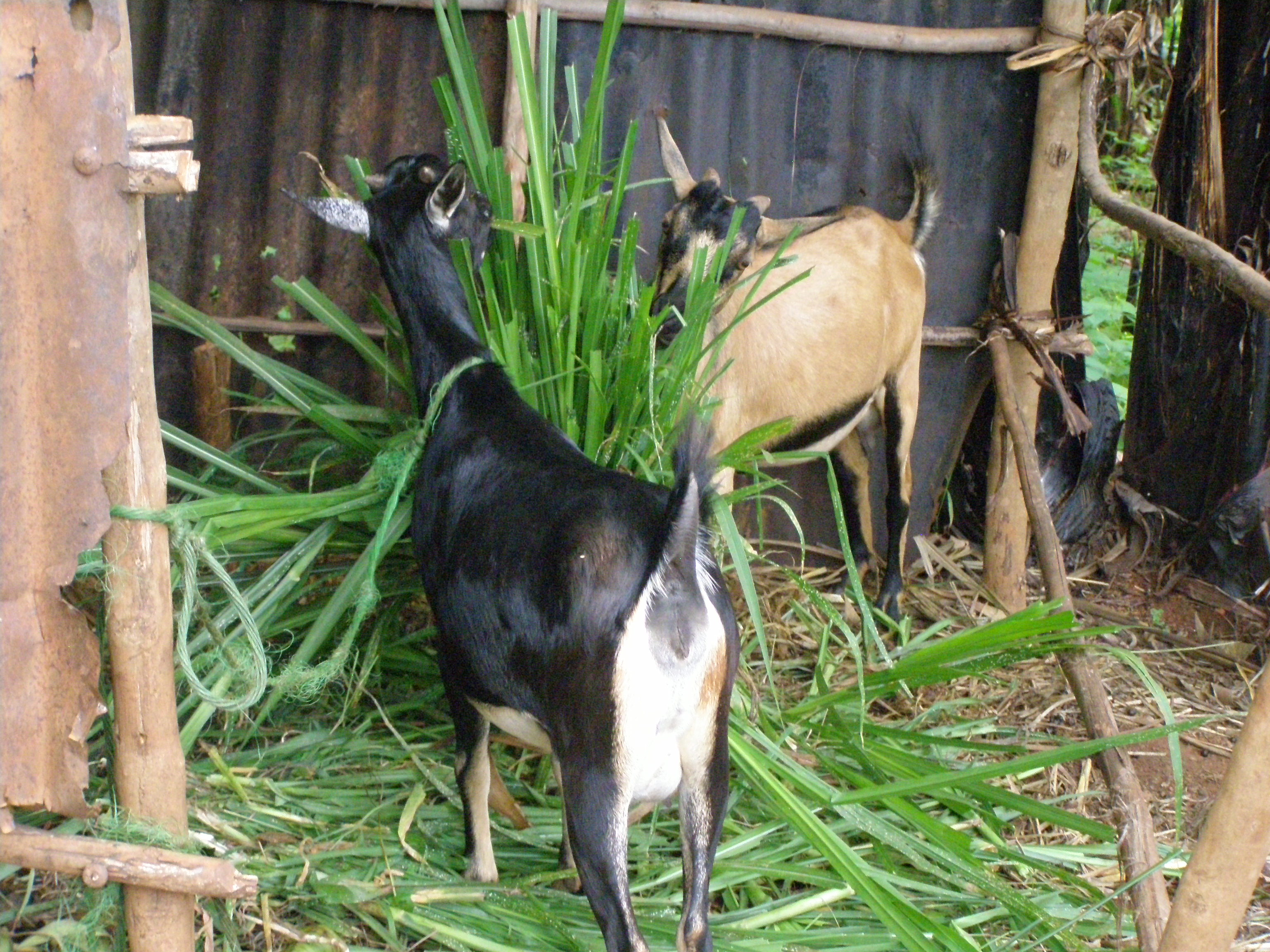
Microlending aims at increasing income through productive activities such as goat herding, as shown here in Rwanda on a cooperative funded through microlending.

Among 6 representative studies selected from a sample of more than 100 studies as being methodologically most sound, five found no evidence that microcredit reduced poverty, although they found other positive impacts.

The first randomized evaluation of the impact of introducing microcredit in a new market has been undertaken by Abhijit Banerjee of the M.I.T. Poverty Action Lab in slums in Hyderabad, India, in 2008. It compared two groups of randomly selected slums. In the treatment group banks opened branches that provided microcredits, while in the control group this was not the case. The study showed that fifteen to 18 months after lending began, there was no effect on average monthly expenditure per capita, but expenditure on durable goods increased. Consumption thus shifted from consumables to durable goods. Also, the number of new businesses increased by one third, but they were not very profitable. Pulitzer prize winner Nicholas Kristof quotes another study by Abhijit Banerjee and Esther Duflo covering loans by Spandana in India. In this case, loans were also used to buy durable goods, but in addition they were used to expand existing businesses.

Tazul Islam argues that the Grameen Bank does not reach the poorest, since the clients of the bank tend to be clustered around the poverty line of predominantly moderately poor or vulnerable non-poor. Of the poor who join Grameen bank's microcredit program, a high percentage often drop out after only a few loan cycles, while many others eventually drop out in later loan cycles as loan amounts begin to exceed their repayment capacity. Nevertheless, he concludes that microcredit in Bangladesh had a "positive impact on enterprise and household income and asset accumulation". Microloans in Canada have allowed small business owners to make their businesses their primary source of income with 67% of the borrowers showing a significant increase in their income as a result of their participation in certain micro-loan programs.

A film by the Danish journalist Tom Heinemann, The Micro Debt, alleges that microcredit in Bangladesh had little impact on poverty. The film highlighted the purported continued poverty of Sufiya Begum, the original loan recipient of Grameen, in Jobra Village. After a thorough investigation in December 2010 by the Norwegian Foreign Ministry, the alleged problems have been proven to be false. Documentary maker Gayle Ferraro found the woman alive and well, confirming the original Grameen story.

Milford Bateman, the author of Why Doesn't Microfinance Work?, argues that microcredit offers only an "illusion of poverty reduction". "As in any lottery or game of chance, a few in poverty do manage to establish microenterprises that produce a decent living," he argues, but "these isolated and often temporary positives are swamped by the largely overlooked negatives." Bateman concludes that "The international development community is now faced with the reality that, overall, microfinance has been a development policy blunder of quite historic proportions."

Professor Anu Muhammad of Jahangirnagar University in Bangladesh, a Marxist and critic of microcredit, claims that "according to different studies" which he does not name, "you cannot find more than 5–10 per cent people who could change their economic conditions through micro-credit."

German journalist Kathrin Hartmann relates tales of women who she met in 2012 while visiting Kurigram District in Bangladesh trapped in debt. She was told by rural women of brutal methods to enforce debt repayments, including the forced sale of goats, cows, house utensils and land. She also describes intense peer pressure under group lending schemes. Heavily indebted men and women even sold their kidneys to organized groups in order to be able to repay loans, as discovered by the police in summer 2011. Hartmann writes, without quoting a source, that one third of microcredits are taken in order to pay for food or health care, especially during the times of the year called Monga when food and work opportunities are scarcest. Children drop out of school to earn money and families cut down on food expenses in order to repay loans. When natural disasters strike, such as Cyclone Sidr in 2007, weekly instalments to repay loans continue, although the ability of borrowers to earn income has been destroyed by the disasters.

A study in the Philippines by Dean Karlan of Yale University and of Innovations for Poverty Action compared a treatment group, financed through microcredit, and a control group that did not receive microcredit, in Manila. In this case many microcredits were loaned to people with existing businesses. The businesses became more profitable, but laid off unproductive employees including friends and relatives that they previously had felt obliged to employ. Male-owned businesses increased profits, but female-owned businesses did not.

== Debt traps, suicides and group pressure ==
In 2008, economist Jonathan Morduch of New York University noted there were still major gaps in research on microcredit, such as on debt traps and the use of microcredits for consumption.

There has been much criticism of the high interest rates charged to borrowers. The real average portfolio yield cited by the sample of 704 microfinance institutions that voluntarily submitted reports to the MicroBanking Bulletin in 2006 was 22.3% annually. However, annual rates charged to clients are higher, as they also include local inflation and the bad debt expenses of the microfinance institution. Interest rates charged by the Mexican Banco Compartamos on their micro-loans reached 86% per year while it sold stocks in the stock market in 2007.

In India microfinance institutions have been criticized for creating small-debt traps for the poor in Andhra Pradesh with high interest rates and coercive methods of recovery. Villagers often did not know the interest that they were being charged and were not aware of the consequences of taking multiple loans as they take the second loan to clear the first loan. In 2010 aggressive lending by microcredit institutions has been blamed for over 80 suicides in Andhra Pradesh. Bangladesh's former Finance and Planning Minister M. Saifur Rahman charged in 2005 that some microfinance institutions use excessive interest rates. A 2008 study in Bangladesh showed that some loan recipients sink into a cycle of debt, using a microloan from one organization to meet interest obligations from another. Field officers who are in a position of power locally and are remunerated based on repayment rates sometimes use coercive and even violent tactics to collect instalments on the microloans.

Private banks and large MNCs have become involved in microfinance. With large corporations investing, local MFIs are under pressure to deliver high returns each quarter; this comes at the expense of borrowers. Foreign and corporate capital investment take advantage of emerging and developing economies across Asia and Africa, introducing new forms of collateral requirements; individuals borrowers sometimes end up in even more debilitating debt and poverty than when they started.

The Cambodian market offers a key example of such problematic and debilitating debt traps. Throughout the early 1990s, Cambodia began as a success story for microfinance in the developing world. By the early 2000s, however, the situation deteriorated until "the typical loan amount [to] now exceed the average annual household income and require land-based collateral". The introduction of land-based collateral has driven thousands of borrowers to sell their property at depreciating rates compared to actual property value in order to pay off their accumulating debts. Companies and stakeholders, on the other hand, benefit from borrower losses. In 2020, as the pandemic ravaged Cambodia's economy, "six of the country's eight biggest microfinance companies posted record earnings," while loanees were driven into devastating amounts of debt due to skyrocketing interest rates. As the market has evolved, companies have deviated from the initial goal of providing loans to fund and develop income-generating opportunities to offering credit for daily living costs and prior loan repayments.

Some microfinance institutions lend only to groups of women. This practice puts loan recipients under pressure, because all women are liable for the loans of the other women in the group and each member can only obtain a new loan if each member has repaid the previous loan.

Muhammad Yunus argues that microfinance institutions that charge more than 15% above their long-term operating costs should face penalties.

== Empowerment of women ==
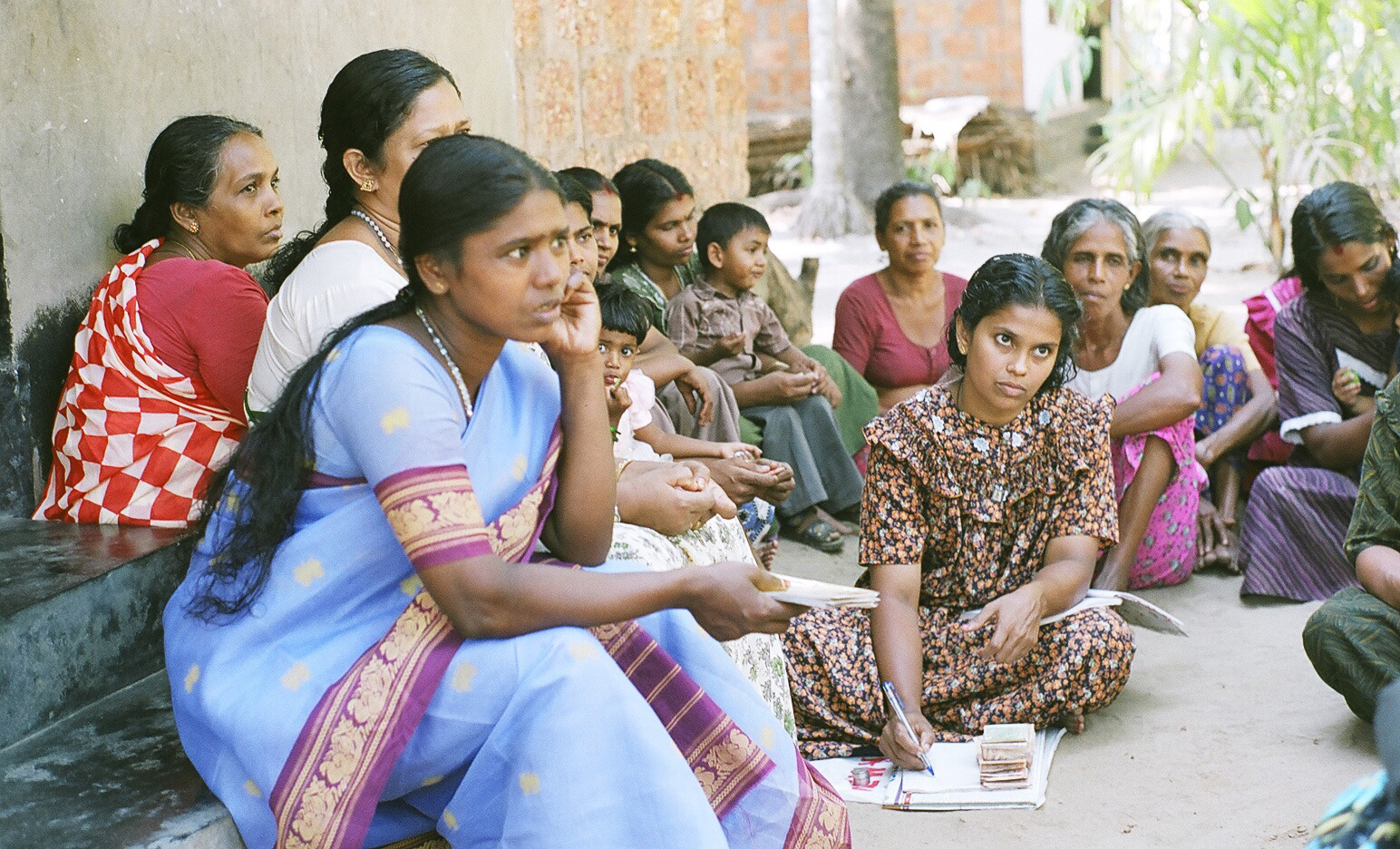
Meeting of clients of the Indian microlender ESAF in the state of Kerala.

Microcredit has been directed at women because it was believed that, compared to men, they are better clients of microfinance institutions and that women's access to microcredit has more desirable development outcomes, since women tend to spend more money on basic needs compared to men. Microcredit has also been promoted as a tool to empower women. Early studies tended to confirm this positive picture. For example, a 1996 study in Bangladesh claims that the "success" of reaching women with microcredit was "highly impressive", but also notes that loans are often given over to male relatives or husbands. Only in a minority of cases there was an increase in domestic violence for women who did not get the loan or had to wait a long time to get the loan. The study also showed that women are more likely to retain control over their loans in traditional women’s work like livestock rearing that are considered "women's work". The President of Grameen Foundation USA suggested in 2005, based on a review of various studies, that "there is strong evidence that female clients are empowered". It also found that "even in cases when women take but do not use the loan themselves, they and their families benefit more than if the loan had gone directly to their husbands".

However, a 2008 study of microcredit programs in Bangladesh found that women often act merely as collection agents for their husbands and sons, such that the men spend the money themselves while women are saddled with the credit risk. The bigger the size of the loan, the more women lose control. For example, a study in Bangladesh showed that women have 100% control over loans that are smaller than 1000 Taka but only 46% of control if the loan is bigger than 4,000 Taka. A study in India showed that women may be put under pressure by their male relatives to join a credit group and indebt themselves. A study in Bangladesh showed that microcredit increases dowries, with women forced at times to take microcredit loans as the only means to pay these increased dowries for their daughters. The first randomized evaluation of the introduction of microcredit, carried out in Hyderabad in India, found no impact on women's decision-making.

One scientist argues that empowerment cannot be given to women by (mostly male) development practitioners in the form of loans, since empowerment is a self-directed process. More female employees should be hired by microfinance institutions, and male staff should be trained in gender awareness.

Based on the evidence of the two evaluations in India and in Manila, Nicolas Kristof concludes that "there is no evidence that microcredit has any effect on ... women's empowerment."

== Other impacts ==
Tazul Islam asserts a positive influence of microcredit on the level of education, health and nutrition. In the US, microcredit has created jobs directly and indirectly, as 60% of borrowers were able to hire others. Business owners in Canada were able to improve their housing situation after their income improved due to business expansion facilitated by microloans, 70% indicating their housing has improved. Ultimately, many of the small-business owners who use social funding are able to graduate from government funding. According to reports, every domestic microcredit loan creates 2.4 jobs. These entrepreneurs provide wages that are, on average, 25% higher than minimum wage.

A 2005 review published by the U.S. Grameen Foundation summarizes scores of studies, concluding that "society-wide benefits that go beyond clients' families are apparently significant".

Based on the evidence of two evaluations in India and in Manila, Nicolas Kristof concludes that "there is no evidence that microcredit has any effect on health or education."

Some research suggests that the availability of microcredit can reduce the incidence of usury.

Unintended consequences of microfinance can include informal intermediaton: that is, some entrepreneurial borrowers become informal intermediaries between microfinance initiatives and poorer micro-entrepreneurs. Those who more easily qualify for microfinance can split loans into smaller credits to even poorer borrowers. Informal intermediation ranges from casual intermediaries at the good or benign end of the spectrum to "loan sharks" at the professional and sometimes criminal end of the spectrum.
