= C.G. Salamander =

- Born: Andrew Prashanth
- Writing career
- Period: Contemporary
- Notable work: Ramya’s Snack box (2016); Frank Goes to the Market (2017); Puu (2018); Yamini and the 7PM Ghosts (2020); Moo Dunnit (2020)
- Website: cgsalamander.com

C.G. Salamander is a writer, editor and comic journalist. He has been published by publishers such as Penguin Books, Scholastic India, and Pratham Books. Some of the books written by him are Moodunnit, Puu, Yamini and the 7 PM Ghosts, Frank Goes to the Market, and City of Rubble.

== Early life ==
C.G. Salamander is the pen-name of Andrew Prashanth who grew up in Chennai, India. He worked as a tour guide to save enough money to publish his first book, Palms Foster Home for Peculiar Stories, which he self published at age 24.

== Awards and recognition ==
C G Salamander has received several grants and awards for his writing. Some of them include:

- Atta Galatta Bangalore Literature Festival Prize (December, 2022)
- Gender Bender Grant, Sandbox Collective and the Goethe Institute (September, 2020)
- India Foundation for Arts IFA 25x25 Grant (September, 2020)
- Oxford Bookstore, Book Cover Prize, Shortlist (January, 2020)
- Manipal Book Completion Fellowship (March, 2018)
- Children Understand More, Goethe Institute (December, 2016)

== Bibliography ==
=== Books ===
- Palms Foster Home for Peculiar Stories (2015) - Self Published. Cover Illustration by Sandhya Prabhat.
- Tara’s Elephant (2016) - MsMoochie, India. Illustrated by Satwik Gade.
- Ramya’s Snack box (2016) - MsMoochie, India. Illustrated by Chetan sharma.
- City of Rubble (2017) - MsMoochie, India. Illustrated by Sahitya Rani.
- Frank Goes to the Market (August 2017, Ms Moochi). Illustrated by Chetan Sharma.
- Puu (2018) - Scholastic India. Illustrated by Samidha Gunjal.
- Yamini and the 7 PM Ghosts - Scholastic India. Illustrated by Sahitya Rani.
- Moodunnit - Duckbill India. Illustrated by Anindri C.
