= Morduch =

Morduch is a surname. Notable people with the surname include:

- Jonathan Morduch (born 1963), American economist
- Ida Morduch-Ekman, Finnish soprano singer
