= Jacob Appel =

Jacob Appel may refer to:

- Jacob M. Appel (born 1973), American author, bioethicist and social critic
- Jacob Appel (painter) (1680–1751), Dutch painter
- Jacob Appel, field economist and co-author of More Than Good Intentions
