= StickK =

American internet company

stickK.com, LLC
- Company type: Private
- Founded: New Haven, Connecticut, United States
- Headquarters: Brooklyn, New York, NY, {{{location_country}}}
- Founders: Dean Karlan; Ian Ayres; Jordan Goldberg
- Website: www.stickk.com
- Launched: 2007

stickK.com, LLC is an American internet company that enables users to make commitment contracts in order to reach their personal goals.

== Service ==
stickK users set up a "commitment contract", a commitment device where they agree to achieve a certain goal, such as losing weight, exercising more, quitting smoking, or conserving energy. They sign a legally binding contract that will send their money to third parties, including either individuals (referred to as "Friend or Foe") or a number of organizations and charities. If users pick "Charity" as a recipient of their forfeited money, stickK selects the charity for the user. Users can also pick a specific organization whose views they oppose referred to as "anti-charities".

The site also allows for referees—people selected by the user to help monitor the progress of their contract. When a user submits a report to the website, the referee is asked to confirm the accuracy of the report. Users are also allowed to designate other users and friends. Such people, known as supporters, receive emails about the users' progress.

== History ==
stickK was started by two Yale University professors, Dean Karlan and Ian Ayres. During graduate school at M.I.T., Karlan and a colleague made a wager to lose 40 pounds each, and to referee one another so as to stay on target. Their service draws on their experiences and two principles from behavioral economics, loss aversion and time inconsistency. They recruited Jordan Goldberg, then a student at the Yale School of Management, to build the company.

The company was founded in New Haven in 2007 and subsequently moved to New York City. It was initially funded by a $150,000 investment from the three founders, and later raised about $2 million from a pool of investors in two rounds. The web site was launched in the beginning of 2008.

Usage of the site is free for individual users, with the initial business plan involving advertising revenues. The company later created non-free B2B products, offering corporations a co-branded version of StickK for the use of their employees or members. In May 2010, stickK.com launched Choose You, where individuals can write commitment contracts and have their friends or family pledge money to the American Cancer Society if the contract is fulfilled.

According to Goldberg, users who put money on the line and have a referee tend to do best. 78% of these users achieve their goals, as compared to only 35% who put no money down. Steven Levitt, co-author of Freakonomics, wrote about and approved of the website and its concept. StickK also appears in the [popular press] book More Than Good Intentions, where it is mentioned as an example of a type of commitment device that can be adapted to development programs in microsavings and health.

According to Karlan, the company's name comes from 'stick'ing to it, and the second K is the legal shorthand for a contract. It also refers to carrot and stick.
