= Anthropology of development =

Scientific study of humans as applied to institutions and economic growth

The anthropology of development is a term applied to a body of anthropological work which views development from a critical perspective. The kind of issues addressed, and implications for the approach typically adopted can be gleaned from a list questions posed by Gow (1996). These questions involve anthropologists asking why, if a key development goal is to alleviate poverty, is poverty increasing? Why is there such a gap between plans and outcomes? Why are those working in development so willing to disregard history and the lessons it might offer? Why is development so externally driven rather than having an internal basis? In short, why is there such a lack of planned development?

This anthropology of development has been distinguished from development anthropology. Development anthropology refers to the application of anthropological perspectives to the multidisciplinary branch of development studies. It takes international development and international aid as primary objects. In this branch of anthropology, the term development refers to the social action made by different agents (institutions, business, enterprise, states, independent volunteers) who are trying to modify the economic, technical, political or/and social life of a given place in the world, especially in impoverished, formerly colonized regions.

Development anthropologists share a commitment to simultaneously critique and contribute to projects and institutions that create and administer Western projects that seek to improve the economic well-being of the most marginalized, and to eliminate poverty. While some theorists distinguish between the 'anthropology of development' (in which development is the object of study) and development anthropology (as an applied practice), this distinction is increasingly thought of as obsolete.

== Early approaches to development ==
Some describe the anthropological critique of development as one that pits modernization and an eradication of the indigenous culture, but this is too reductive and not the case with the majority of scholarly work. In fact, most anthropologists who work in impoverished areas desire the same economic relief for the people they study as policymakers, however they are wary about the assumptions and models on which development interventions are based. Anthropologists and others who critique development projects instead view Western development itself as a product of Western culture that must be refined in order to better help those it claims to aid. The problem therefore is not that of markets driving out culture, but of the fundamental blind-spots of Western developmental culture itself. Criticism often focuses therefore on the cultural bias and blind-spots of Western development institutions, or modernization models that: systematically represent non-Western societies as more deficient than the West; erroneously assume that Western modes of production and historical processes are repeatable in all contexts; or that do not take into account hundreds of years of colonial exploitation by the West that has tended to destroy the resources of former colonial society. Most critically, anthropologists argue that sustainable development requires at the very least more inclusion of the people who the project aims to target to be involved in the creation, management and decision-making process in the project creation in order to improve development.

=== Pre-WWII: Rhodes-Livingstone Institute ===
The British government established the Rhodes-Livingstone Institute in 1937 to conduct social science research in British Central Africa. It was part of the colonial establishment, although its head, anthropologist Max Gluckman, was a critic of colonial rule. Gluckman refused to describe colonialism as a simple case of "culture contact" since it was not a case of cultures mutually influencing each other, but of the forced incorporation of Africans into a foreign social, political and economic system. The anthropologists of the Institute were core members of what came to be known as the "Manchester school" of anthropology noted for looking at issues of social justice such as apartheid and class conflict.

=== Culture of poverty ===
The term "subculture of poverty" (later shortened to "culture of poverty") made its first prominent appearance in the ethnography Five Families: Mexican Case Studies in the Culture of Poverty (1959) by anthropologist Oscar Lewis. Lewis struggled to render "the poor" as legitimate subjects whose lives were transformed by poverty. He argued that although the burdens of poverty were systemic and therefore imposed upon these members of society, they led to the formation of an autonomous subculture as children were socialized into behaviors and attitudes that perpetuated their inability to escape the underclass. In sociology and anthropology, the concept created a backlash, pushing scholars to abandon cultural justifications and negative descriptions of poverty, fearing such analysis may be read as "blaming-the-victim."

=== Modernization Theory and its critics ===
The most influential modernization theorist in development was Walt Rostow, whose The Stages of Economic Growth: A Non-Communist Manifesto (1960) concentrates on the economic side of the modernization, and especially the factors needed for a country to reach "take-off" to self-sustaining growth. He argued that today's underdeveloped areas are in a similar situation to that of today's developed areas at some time in the past, and that therefore the task in helping the underdeveloped areas out of poverty is to accelerate them along this supposed common path of development, by various means such as investment, technology transfers, and closer integration into the world market. Rostow's unilineal evolutionist model hypothesized all societies would progress through the same stages to a modernity defined by the West. The model postulates that economic growth occurs in five basic stages, of varying length:

1. Traditional society
2. Preconditions for take-off
3. Take-off
4. Drive to maturity
5. Age of High mass consumption

As should be clear from the subtitle of his book, Rostow sought to provide a capitalist rebuttal to the unilinear Marxist growth models being pursued in the newly independent communist regimes in the second and third world; an effort that would lead to the "Green revolution" to combat the "Red revolution".

==== George Dalton and the substantivists ====
George Dalton applied the substantivist economic ideas of Karl Polanyi to economic anthropology, and to development issues. The substantivist approach demonstrated the ways in which economic activities in non-market societies were embedded in other, non-economic social institutions such as kinship, religion and political relations. He therefore critiqued the formalist economic modelling of Rostow. He was the author of "Growth without development: An economic survey of Liberia" (1966, with Robert W. Clower) and "Economic Anthropology and Development: Essays on Tribal and Peasant Economies" (1971).

==== Dependency theory ====
Dependency theory arose as a theory in Latin America in reaction to modernization theory. It argues that resources flow from a "periphery" of poor and underdeveloped states to a "core" of wealthy states, enriching the latter at the expense of the former. It is a central contention of dependency theory that poor states are impoverished and rich ones enriched by the way poor states are integrated into the "World-system" and hence poor countries will not follow Rostow's predicted path of modernization. Dependency theory rejected Rostow's view, arguing that underdeveloped countries are not merely primitive versions of developed countries, but have unique features and structures of their own; and, importantly, are in the situation of being the weaker members in a world market economy and hence unable to change the system.

Immanuel Wallerstein's "world-systems theory" was the version of Dependency theory that most North American anthropologists engaged with. His theories are similar to Dependency theory, although he placed more emphasis on the system as system, and focused on the developments of the core rather than periphery. Wallerstein also provided an historical account of the development of capitalism which had been missing from Dependency theory.

==== 'Women in development' (WID) ====
Women in development (WID) is an approach to development projects that emerged in the 1970s, calling for treatment of women's issues in development projects. Later, the Gender and development (GAD) approach proposed more emphasis on gender relations rather than seeing women's issues in isolation. The WID school grew out of the pioneering work of Esther Boserup. Boserup's most notable book is The Conditions of Agricultural Growth: The Economics of Agrarian Change under Population Pressure. This book presents a "dynamic analysis embracing all types of primitive agriculture." Drawing on Boserup, the WID theorists pointed out that the division of labour in agriculture is frequently gendered, and that in societies practicing shifting cultivation, it is women who conduct most of the agricultural work. Development projects, however, were skewed towards men on the assumption they were "heads of households."

== Development discourse and the creation of the 'underdeveloped' world ==
A major critique of development from anthropologists came from Arturo Escobar's seminal book Encountering Development, which argued that Western development largely exploited non-Western peoples. Arturo Escobar views international development as a means for the Occident to keep control over the resources of its former colonies. Escobar shows that between 1945 and 1960, while the former colonies were going through decolonization, development plans helped to maintain the third world's dependency on the old metropole. Development projects themselves flourished in the wake of WWII, and during the cold war, when they were developed to

1. stop the spread of Communism with the spread of capitalist markets; and

2. create more prosperity for the West and its products by creating a global consumer demand for finished Western products abroad.

Some scholars blame the different agents for having only considered a small aspect of the local people's lives without analyzing broader consequences, while others like dependency theory or Escobar argue that development projects are doomed to failure for the fundamental ways they privilege Western industry and corporations. Escobar's argument echos the earlier work of dependency theory and follows a larger critique more recently posed by Foucault and other poststructuralists.

=== The World Bank and the development regime ===
The World Bank Group consists of multiple institutions including the International Development Association (IDA), the International Finance Corporation (IFC), the International Bank for Reconstruction and Development (IBRD), and the Multilateral Investment Guarantee Agency (MIGA). IDA credits as well as IBRD loans support both development projects, and structural adjustment programs alike.

The IDA of the World Bank Group was created in 1960, per urgent request of U.S. President Dwight D. Eisenhower. The IDA gave the Bank the resources and mandate it required to address the issues of the poorest countries and their citizens. This institution served as a channel for the more economically stable nations of the world to assist those with less financial stability by providing long-term loans at no interest to the most economically challenged among developing countries. The IDA's concessional financing by 138 countries is mainly exclusive to countries that have a per capita income of $400 or less (no more than about $900) and lack the financial means to borrow from the IBRD, the main lending institution of the World Bank. Loans issued by the IDA carry maturity dates of 35 or 40 years from the date of issue, with a 10-year grace period on the principal repayment. In the fiscal year of 1989, total lending for the World Bank was approximately $23.06 billion.

Per present day, more than 2.5 billion people, more than half of the developing world representing 79 countries, have the eligibility to borrow from the IDA. Since its creation in 1960, the IDA remains the single largest source of donor funding for social services at a basic level; including health, clean water, sanitation, education, and infrastructure to the world's impoverished nations.

In the 1950s, many of these nations were newly independent from colonial rule, therefore suffering from economic and political instability and an inability to afford development loans on the typical terms offered by the World Bank. Utilizing the same criteria to evaluate loans as the IBRD facility of the World Bank, the IDA's development regime pursues funding projects that protect the environment and build needed infrastructure. They also aid the betterment of conditions supporting the development of private industries, and support reforms that function to liberalize countries' economies. Since its establishment in 1960, the IDA has lent $106 billion to 106 countries to fund the basic needs of billions of poverty-stricken peoples.

IDA lending for Fiscal Year 1989 (FY89) totaled at $4.9 billion in credits and broken down by region: 48% to Africa, 44% to Asia, and 8% to Europe, the Middle East, and Latin America.

IDA lending for FY89 by sector approximates as follows: 29% agriculture; 24% structural and sector adjustment lending; 16% transportation and telecommunications; 10% energy; 9% education; 5% population, health, and nutrition; 4% water supply and sewage.

==== Success of the IDA ====
On a major scale, the global development community has been impacted by the IDA, with success rates that compare favorably with both public and private sector investments around the world. Thirty-two countries that borrowed from the IDA have resulting growth and development beyond the point where they have lost their eligibility to use IDA funds, granting them "graduate" status from the IDA.

==== The Concerns of the IDA ====
Members of the IDA community, including the IDA's most avid supporters, have raised criticisms concerning IDA policies, effectiveness, and resources. There is much room for improvement in the IDA's track record, namely for its support in Africa. A number of policy reforms instituted by a number of African countries had failed to obtain desired results. The specific failures lay in the decline in export prices coupled with the emerging restrictions on the import of African goods, done by some of the industrialized countries. The World Bank providing service to Africa by enhancing its pursuit in its current development strategy proved insufficient in placing its nations on a secure path of development.

== Governmentality: Development as 'anti-politics machine' ==
Location of Lesotho in South Africa

At a critical juncture in the early nineteenth century the state began to connect itself to a series of groups "that in different ways had long tried to shape and administer the lives of individuals in pursuit of various goals" rather than simply extend the absolutist state's repressive machinery of social control. Michel Foucault's work on the prison, the clinic, and the asylum – on the development of "bio-power" – analyzed the plurality of governing agencies and authorities who developed programs, strategies, and technologies that were deployed to optimize the health, welfare and life of populations. He referred to this process with the neologism, "governmentality" (governmental rationality). One of the last of these new applied sciences was the "development apparatus", the post-world war extension of colonial rule after the independence of third world states. James Ferguson utilized the governmentality framework in "The Anti-Politics Machine: "Development," Depoliticization and Bureaucratic Power in Lesotho" (1990), the first in many similar explorations. Ferguson sought to explore how "development discourse" works. That is, how do the language and practices used by development specialists influence the ways in which development is delivered, and what unintended consequences does it foster. He found that development projects which failed in their own terms could be redefined as "successes" on which new projects were to be modelled. The net effect of development, he found, was to "de-politicize" questions of resource allocation, and to strengthen bureaucratic power. In his analysis of a development project in Lesotho (South Africa) between 1978 and 1982, he examined the following discursive maneuvers.

Ferguson points out that a critical part of the development process is the way in which the object of development is defined. In defining this object, it is severed from its historical and geographic context, and isolated as a "Less-Developed Country." In the case of Lesotho, its history as a grain exporting region was ignored, as was its current role as a labour reserve for the South African mines. Not wanting to deal with the apartheid South African regime, development agencies isolated the "independent" Lesotho from the regional economy in which it was entrapped in their project rationales and reports. Artificially taken out of this larger capitalist context, Lesotho's economy was described as "isolated," "non-market" and "traditional" and thus a proper target for aid intervention.

Ferguson underscores that these discourses are produced within institutional settings where they must provide a charter for governmental intervention. Any analysis which suggests the roots of poverty lie in areas outside the scope of government are quickly dismissed and discarded since they cannot provide a rationale for state action. And since the capitalist economy is one such area which has been ideologically set outside the scope of governmental action, the discursive creation of a deformed 'native economy' creates the required opening for that intervention.

Ferguson writes that it is not enough to note development's failures; even the project managers initially recognized it as a failure. If that was all Ferguson had done, his book would not have had the influence it did. Asking if development is a failure is asking the wrong question; it ignores the "instrument effects" of what the projects DO do. In other words, we should ask what NON-economic functions does development serve? His answer:

1. It's an "anti-politics machine"; it makes blatantly political decisions about the allocation of resources appear to be "technical solutions to technical problems". Important questions such as the reallocation of land to a limited number (leaving them relatively wealthy, and others in poverty) are rephrased as a "necessity for the sustainable commercial management of livestock." A large proportion of men are deprived of their retirement savings.
2. "Integrated development" served to strengthen the presence of a repressive government in an isolated and resistant area. Development projects are dependent upon local governments for implementation, and rarely challenge the nature of that government. The resources they supply frequently serve state needs more than local needs.
3. It perpetuates the migrant labour system. The project neglected to look at Lesotho in the regional economy with South Africa. Lesotho was a labour reserve for Apartheid-era South African mines. The men of Lesotho were not farmers, but unemployed workers and retirees. Real commercial farming was never a possibility without large subsidies. The project thus served to preserve a pool of cheap labour for South Africa in a time when international sanctions against Apartheid were hitting its economy.

=== Ecogovernmentality ===
Ecogovernmentality, (or Eco-governmentality), is the application of Foucault's concepts of biopower and governmentality to the analysis of the regulation of social interactions with the natural world. The concept of Ecogovernmentality expands on Foucault's genealogical examination of the state to include ecological rationalities and technologies of government. Following Michel Foucault, writing on ecogovernmentality focuses on how government agencies, in combination with producers of expert knowledge, construct "The Environment." This construction is viewed both in terms of the creation of an object of knowledge and a sphere within which certain types of intervention and management are created and deployed to further the government's larger aim of managing the lives of its constituents. This governmental management is dependent on the dissemination and internalization of knowledge/power among individual actors. This creates a decentered network of self-regulating elements whose interests become integrated with those of the State.

Work done by Arun Agrawal on local forest governance in India, is an example of this method of analysis. He illustrates how the production of specific types of expert knowledge (the economic productivity of forests) coupled with specific technologies of government (local Forest Stewardship Councils) can bring individual interest in line with those of the state. This, not through the imposition of specific outcomes, but by creating frameworks that rationalizes behavior in particular ways and involve individuals in the process of problem definition and intervention.

== Agricultural development: the "Green Revolution" ==
The term "Green Revolution" was first used in 1968 by former United States Agency for International Development (USAID) director William Gaud, who noted the spread of the new technologies:

"These and other developments in the field of agriculture contain the makings of a new revolution. It is not a violent Red Revolution like that of the Soviets, nor is it a White Revolution like that of the Shah of Iran. I call it the Green Revolution."

== See also ==
- Development anthropology
- Development criticism
- Development studies
- Food sovereignty
- Impact of microcredit
- Weapons of the weak

== Sources ==
- Van Marle, Karin (2006). Sex, Gender, Becoming: Post-apartheid Reflections. PULP. ISBN 0-9585097-5-1.
