= Pratham =

Indian non-governmental organisation

- Logo
- Founder: Madhav Chavan, Farida Lambay
- Type: Not for profit
- Headquarters: Mumbai, Delhi
- Location: International
- Region served: India
- Chief Executive Officer: Dr. Rukmini Banerji
- Website: pratham.org

Pratham is one of the largest non-governmental organisations in India. It was co-founded by Madhav Chavan and Farida Lambay. It works towards the provision of quality education to the underprivileged children in India. Established in Mumbai in 1995 to provide pre-school education to children in slums, Pratham today has interventions spread across 23 states and union territories of India and has supporting chapters in the United States, UK, Germany, Sweden, and Australia.

Pratham's founder and Ex-CEO, Madhav Chavan, was the 2011 recipient of the Skoll Award for Social Entrepreneurship. In addition, Pratham received the 2013 BBVA Foundation Frontiers of Knowledge Award in Development Cooperation, as a result of successfully catering to the learning needs of tens of millions of disadvantaged children for over twenty years. In doing so, it has designed and implemented new methods that accelerate reading acquisition, using a grassroots approach in which pupils are grouped by actual levels and needs instead of age, while providing specific training to the teachers and volunteers recruited to its programs. In 2018, Pratham was awarded the Lui Che Woo Prize, a cross-sector innovation prize that recognizes outstanding contributions benefiting humanity. Pratham was unanimously selected in the Positive Energy category, which in that year focused on the elimination of illiteracy.

== History ==
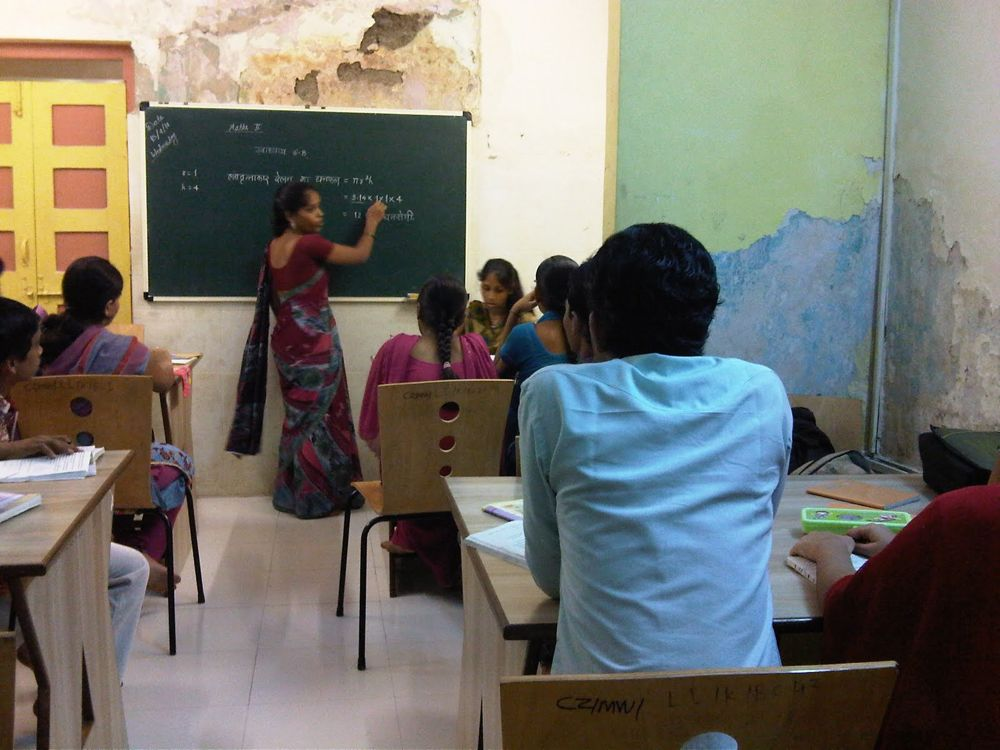
Math class in Mumbai, India, August–November 2010

UNICEF originally set up the Bombay Education Initiative in Mumbai to establish a tripartite-partnership between the government, corporate and civil society to improve India's primary education. This led to the formation of Pratham as an independent charity in 1995.

Pratham started by holding balwadis (pre-education classes) for children in Mumbai's slums. Volunteers were recruited to teach in spaces within communities, including temples, offices, and even people's homes. The Pratham pre-school classes multiplied and were replicated in other locations.

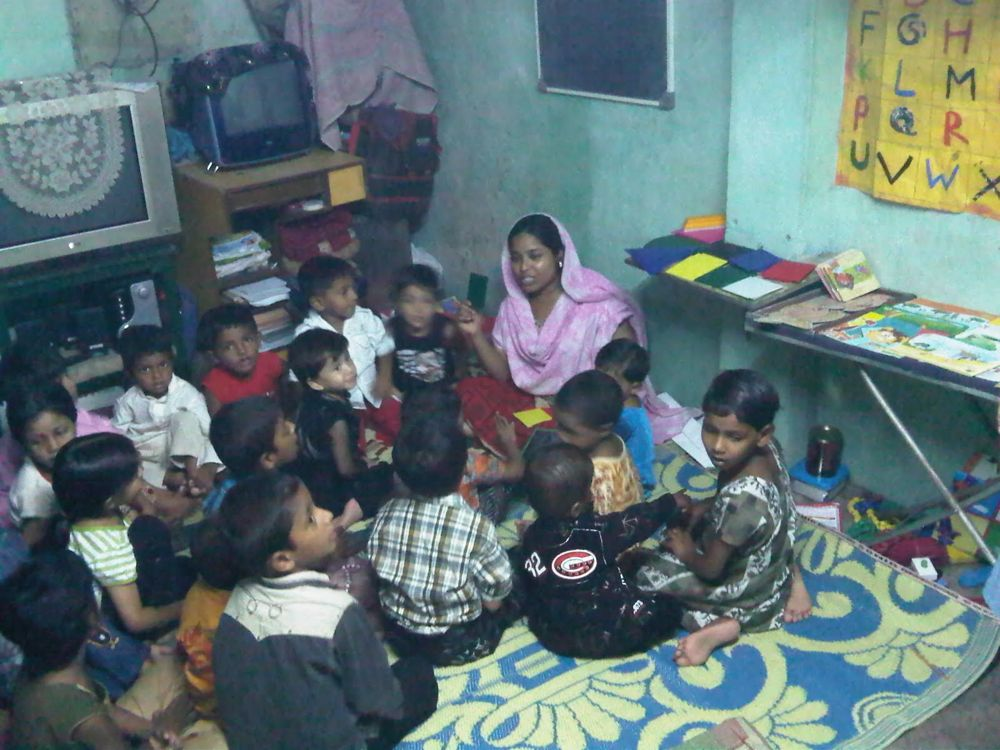
Pre-school class, Mumbai, India, August–November 2010

== Mission ==
Pratham's mission is "Every Child in School and Learning well". By increasing the literacy levels of India's poor which account for about one third of the world's poor, Pratham aims to improve India's economic and social equality. This is carried out through the introduction of low cost education models that are sustainable and reproducible.

== Work ==
Annual Status of Education Report (or ASER), is a household-based survey that collects information on children's schooling status and basic learning outcomes in almost every rural district in the country. The ASER survey is an enormous participatory exercise that has involved about 500 organizations and upwards of 25,000 volunteers every year since 2005. As part of the survey, estimates of children's schooling and learning status are generated at district, state and national levels. ASER is the only annual source of data on children's learning outcomes available in India today, and is often credited with changing the focus of discussions on education in India from inputs to outcomes. The ASER model has been adapted for use by fourteen other countries across three continents. These countries have organically come together to form the People's Action for Learning (PAL) Network, with a secretariat housed in Nairobi.

Read India: Despite India's educational reforms in recent years, quality education is still a concern, especially among low-income communities. Findings of ASER 2005 and 2006 revealed that 50% of children in government schools could not read, write or do basic arithmetic despite being in school for 4–5 years. Hence Read India was launched in 2007 to improve reading, writing and basic arithmetic skills of 6 to 14-year-old children and is carried out by school teachers, anganwadi workers and volunteers, whom Pratham trains. Read India has reached approximately 34 million children to date, resulting in large-scale improvements in literacy levels across several states in India.

Pratham Books, a non-profit organisation which publishes affordable, quality books for children, was set up in 2004 to complement Read India. It has published over 200 original titles in 10 Indian languages and reached over 14 million children.

Direct programs: Pratham's direct programs seek to supplement governmental efforts to improve quality of education through balwadis (pre-school education), learning support programs, libraries and mainstreaming drop-out children. Full-year learning support is provided at centres for children living in the immediate vicinity. These programs are typically conducted in urban slums or poor villages, where children do not have easy access to quality education.

Lakhon Mein Ek is a call-to-action campaign by Pratham Education Foundation and ASER Centre. Together with citizens from across the country, the organisation worked towards improving the status of children's learning in 100,000 villages and communities.

The campaign started on 21 October 2015 and by 11 January 2016, had reached more than 150,000 villages and communities. Furthermore, over 300,000 volunteers had joined the campaign and interacted with about 1 crore (10 million) children. By 16 January 2016, success of the campaign will be marked by citizens everywhere resolving to help children acquire basic reading and math abilities in these locations.

Vocational Training: In 2005, Pratham launched Pratham Institute, its vocational skilling arm. The objective was to train youth from economically disadvantaged backgrounds (age 18‐25 years) and provide them with employable skills, coupled with access to employment and entrepreneurship opportunities. Today Pratham Institute programs across the country enable youth to access entry-level positions and placements in 10 major vocations. Approximately 25,000 young people were reached in 2017–2018, and the youth were trained and subsequently placed in entry-level jobs or helped to start their own businesses.

Other Work: Pratham has also set up other programs for disadvantaged Indian children and youth, including Pratham Council for Vulnerable Children (PCVC), Early Childhood Care and Education Centre (ECCE), and Computer-aided Literacy.

== Teaching at the Right Level ==
Pratham has developed Teaching at the Right Level (TaRL), an educational approach aimed at helping children acquire foundational skills in reading and arithmetic. The approach groups students based on their assessed learning level rather than age or grade, and instruction is delivered according to these learning levels.

The TaRL methodology was initially designed for students in primary school who had not yet acquired basic literacy and numeracy skills with the understanding that the absence of foundational skills in the primary school years makes it difficult to learn them later and cope with subsequent curriculum. Instruction under the approach focuses on foundational competencies such as basic reading, comprehension, oral expression, and arithmetic, which are considered prerequisites for further academic learning.

The approach has been implemented at scale in India and has been adapted for use by governments and organizations in multiple countries in Africa, South Asia, and Latin America.

== Recognition ==
Pratham has been recognized internationally by prestigious awards and prominent organizations for both the quality of its innovations, as well as its extensive impact.

- Yidan Prize for Education Development to Rukmini Banerji (2021)
- Lui Che Woo 2018 Prize in the Positive Energy Category for eliminating illiteracy, Hong Kong (2018)
- Medal for Distinguished Service to Madhav Chavan, Teachers College, Columbia University (2017)
- BBVA Foundation 'Frontiers of Knowledge' Award (2014)
- Recognition by the Asia Society as Asia Game Changer (2014)
- WISE Prize for Education to Madhav Chavan (2012)
- The Kravis Prize in Leadership (2010)

== External reviews ==
=== GiveWell review ===
In November 2011, US-based charity evaluator GiveWell identified Pratham as one of six "standout" organisations to give to in its list of top charities. This placed Pratham below the top-ranked charities Against Malaria Foundation and Schistosomiasis Control Initiative and alongside Innovations for Poverty Action, GiveDirectly, KIPP (Houston branch), Nyaya Health, and Small Enterprise Foundation. GiveWell also lists Pratham as its top charity in the developing world education category.

GiveWell has also published a detailed review of Pratham, last updated in March 2012.

=== Global Education Evidence Advisory Panel recommendation ===
Pratham's Teaching at the Right Level (TaRL) approach was recommended as a 'Good Buy' in the Global Education Evidence Advisory Panel (GEEAP)'s October 2020 report on Smart Buys in education for low- and middle-income countries.
