= Small Enterprise Foundation =

South African-based microfinance institution

Small Enterprise Foundation (SEF) is a microfinance institution operating primarily in the Limpopo province of South Africa; however, it also has branches in Eastern Cape, Mpumalanga,, Kwa-Zulu Natal and Guateng. It was founded by John de Wit and Matome Malatji in 1992.

== GiveWell review ==
Small Enterprise Foundation has been reviewed by charity evaluator GiveWell. In its review, GiveWell rated SEF as its top microfinance charity and commended SEF's "strong focus on collecting the information necessary to assess its social impact." GiveWell first review of SEF was in 2009, but the review was subsequently updated multiple times with the most recent update being in March 2012.

In November 2011, GiveWell listed SEF as one of six standout organizations in its list of organizations recommended for donors, along with Nyaya Health, Pratham, GiveDirectly, Innovations for Poverty Action, and KIPP (Houston branch) but below the two top-rated organizations Against Malaria Foundation and Schistosomiasis Control Initiative.

== Funding ==
In August 2012, Good Ventures announced a grant of $50,000 (USD) to the Small Enterprise Foundation on the strength of charity evaluator GiveWell's recommendation.
