= Innovations for Poverty Action =

American non-profit research and policy organization

- Founded: 2002
- Founder: Dean Karlan
- Type: Research into poverty alleviation and development programs
- Purpose: Program Evaluation in areas such as Microfinance; Public Health; Agriculture; Education
- Location: Washington, D.C., United States of America
- Region served: Global
- Key people: Dean Karlan, Annie Duflo
- Website: poverty-action.org

Innovations for Poverty Action (IPA) is an American non-profit research and policy organization founded in 2002 by economist Dean Karlan. Since its foundation, IPA has worked with over academics to conduct evaluations across Africa, Asia, and Latin America & the Caribbean.. The organization also manages the Poverty Probability Index.

IPA conducts randomized controlled trials (RCTs), along with other types of quantitative research, to measure the impacts of development programs in multiple sectors. Its partner organizations include over 400 governments, nonprofits, academic institutions, foundations, and companies.

== History and mission ==
IPA was founded in 2002 by Dean Karlan, an economist at Northwestern University. The organization is dedicated to finding and promoting solutions to global poverty and "bridging the gap between academia and development policy".

IPA has offices in New York and Washington, D.C., as well as offices in Africa, Asia and South America. As of 2021, the organization is led by executive director Annie Duflo.

=== Funding ===
IPA seeks funding from both individuals and foundations. IPA has been funded by a number of foundations and other non-profits. These include the Bill & Melinda Gates Foundation, Omidyar Network, Citi Foundation, Hewlett Foundation, Mulago Foundation, Ford Foundation, World Bank, USAID, DFID, and others. A number of universities and think tanks have also funded IPA and its projects, including Harvard University, Massachusetts Institute of Technology, and Stanford University.

== Activities ==
IPA conducts controlled, randomized studies of aid programs. Their studies are conducted in much the same matter as scientific studies to determine the impact of such programs and find effective methods for reducing poverty. IPA's evaluations assess interventions in the areas of small and medium enterprises, financial inclusion, peace and recovery, governance, health, education, agriculture, and social protection.

As of 2017, IPA had designed and conducted more than 650 evaluations in partnership with over 400 leading academics. IPA also works to ensure that decision-makers use and apply evidence by making it useful and accessible. IPA does this through collaborating with decision-makers while creating policy-relevant evidence, proactive sharing of results, and providing technical assistance to applying solutions at scale.

== Partners ==
IPA works with more than 400 nonprofit organizations, governments, academic institutions, and companies to design programs and conduct evaluations.

The Abdul Latif Jameel Poverty Action Lab (J-PAL) is a close partner of IPA. The two organizations share a common mission and take similar methodological approaches to development policy evaluation. Both organizations have pioneered the use of randomized evaluations to study the effectiveness of development interventions worldwide and have collaborated extensively on field studies involving randomized evaluations. IPA and J-PAL attempt to bridge the gap between research and the policy world by creating and disseminating knowledge about what works to policymakers and practitioners around the world.

IPA has a number of other partners including the World Bank, various agencies of the United Nations, a number of national and regional governments such as the government of Sierra Leone, and a number of charities that collaborate with IPA in the design and evaluation of their programs, such as Save the Children, Population Services International, One Acre Fund, and Pratham.

== Research ==
IPA's research spans eight programs including agriculture, education, financial inclusion, governance, health, peace and recovery, small and medium enterprises, and social protection. The results of IPA studies have been published by IPA research affiliates in peer-reviewed academic journals such as Econometrica, Science, the Quarterly Journal of Economics, American Economic Review, and the Review of Financial Studies, among others.

=== Method ===
IPA uses randomized controlled trials (RCTs) in its approach to anti-poverty research. RCTs are primarily known for their application in medical research to isolate the impact of a particular pharmaceutical or treatment from other factors. As in these medical trials, researchers assign participants at random to different study groups. One or more groups receive a program (the "treatment groups") and another group serves as the comparison (or "control") group. Though there are critiques to the randomized approach, its use in the social sciences is growing. Critics have included notable development economists such as Angus Deaton and Daron Acemoglu.

=== Microfinance ===
IPA performs many evaluations of microfinance programs and products, including microcredit, microsavings, and microinsurance. IPA is part of the Financial Access Initiative (FAI), a consortium launched with the support of a $5 million grant from the Bill & Melinda Gates Foundation with the goal of increasing knowledge about microfinance and communicating research lessons to a broad spectrum of policy-makers, microfinance institutions, and the public at large.

An example of IPA's research on microfinance includes examinations of the impact of group liability. Many microcredit programs are offered to groups of women who share "group liability", meaning that all members of the group are responsible for repaying the loans if one of the members defaults. Group liability has been promoted by Nobel Prize winner Muhammad Yunus as the best way to ensure high repayment rates. IPA studies conducted in a variety of countries show that switching existing clients to individual liability does not increase default rates, however. Further, IPA studies demonstrate that microcredit does not have a transformative impact on poverty, but that it can give low-income households more freedom in optimizing the ways they make money, consume, and invest.

=== Agriculture ===
IPA's agriculture research evaluates whether interventions aimed at increasing or protecting farm income are effective. This research has included projects that examine the impact of crop prices, rainfall insurance, fertilizer use, and access to export markets.

== External reviews ==
=== GiveWell review ===
In November 2011, charity evaluator GiveWell published a review of IPA and listed it among six standout organizations along with GiveDirectly, KIPP (Houston branch), Nyaya Health, Pratham, and Small Enterprise Foundation but below the two top-rated charities Against Malaria Foundation and Schistosomiasis Control Initiative.

=== The Life You Can Save ===
The advocacy and education outreach organization The Life You Can Save founded after of the release of the Peter Singer book The Life You Can Save, rates IPA as a trusted charity backed by evidence.

== See also ==
- Abdul Latif Jameel Poverty Action Lab
- More Than Good Intentions
