= Super Crunchers =

Super Crunchers: Why Thinking-by-Numbers Is the New Way to be Smart
- Author: Ian Ayres
- Language: English
- Subjects: Statistics, Economics
- Publisher: Bantam
- Publication date: 2007
- Pages: 272
- ISBN: 978-0-553-80540-6
- OCLC: 122973719
- Dewey Decimal: 519.5 22
- LC Class: HA29 .A88 2007

Super Crunchers: Why Thinking-by-Numbers Is the New Way to be Smart is a book written by Ian Ayres, a law professor at Yale Law School, about how quantitative analysis of social behaviour and natural experiment can be creatively deployed to reveal insights in all areas of life, often in unexpected ways.

With examples such as predicting gestation period more precisely than Naegele's rule, predicting the box office success of films, Orley Ashenfelter's work predicting the price of Bordeaux wine based on weather data, collecting data on the effectiveness of teaching methods such as DISTAR, choosing baseball players based on statistics (Sabermetrics), and A/B testing to determine the most effective advertisements, Ayres explains how statistical evidence can be used as a supplement or substitute for human intuition.

The main mathematical approach used in these studies is multiple regression analysis.

== Awards ==
- The Economist – Books of the Year 2007

== See also ==
- Freakonomics
