= Dean Karlan =

American economist

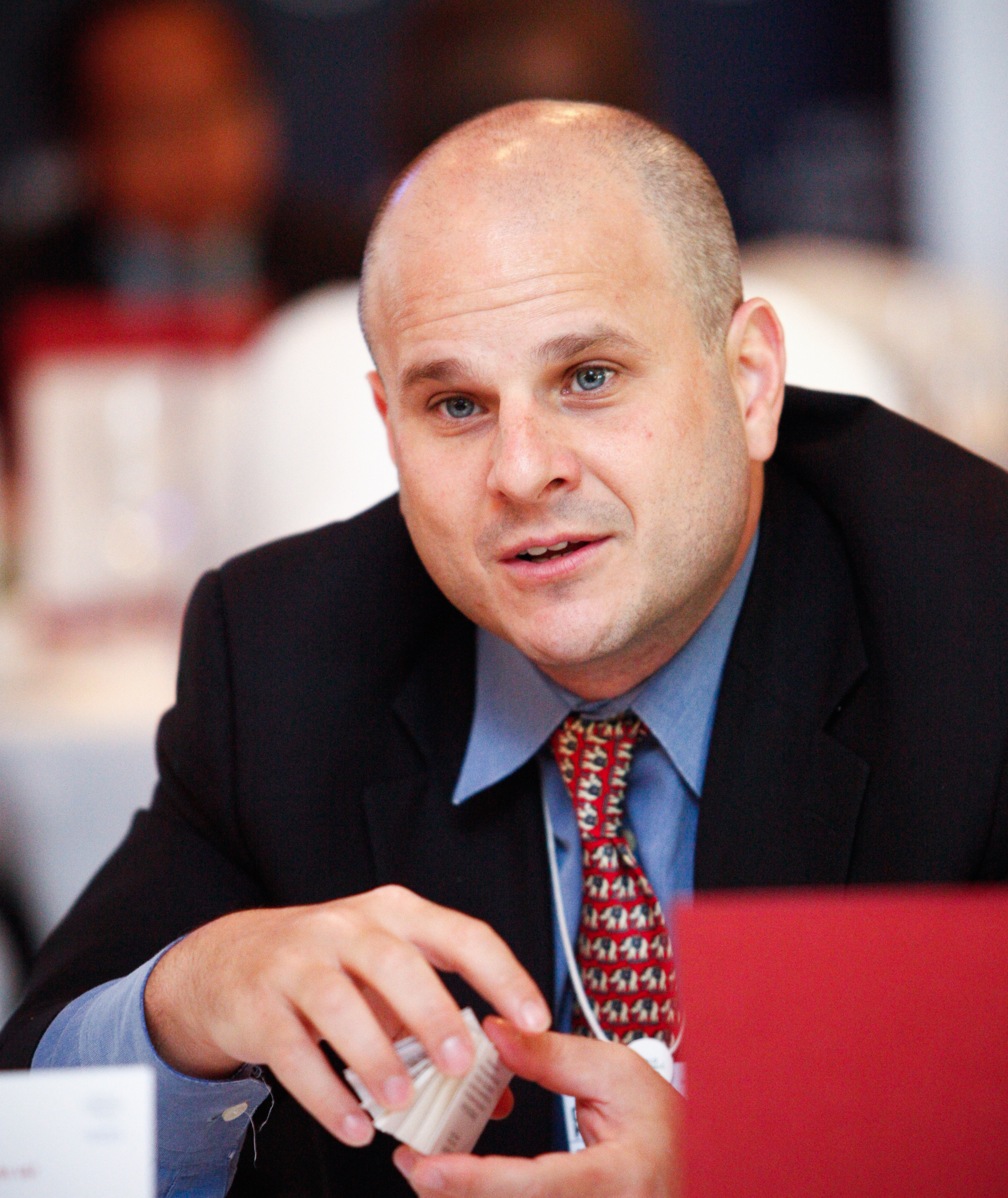

Chief Economist of the US Agency for International Development
- In office November 15, 2022 – February 26, 2025
- President: Joe Biden
- Administrator: Samantha Power

Academic background
- Education: MIT (PhD 2002); UChicago (MBA, MPP 1997); University of Virginia (BA 1990)
- Doctoral advisor: Abhijit Banerjee; Esther Duflo

Academic work
- Discipline: Development economics Behavioral economics
- Institutions: Northwestern (2017–present); NBER (2011–present); Yale (2005–2017); Princeton (2002–2005)
- Awards: Guggenheim Fellowship; Sloan Fellowship; NSF CAREER Award
- Website: Information at IDEAS / RePEc

Dean Karlan is an American development economist and social entrepreneur. He is the Frederic Esser Nemmers Distinguished Professor of Economics and Finance at Northwestern University where, alongside Christopher Udry, he co-directs the Global Poverty Research Lab at the Kellogg School of Management. Karlan served as the chief economist at the United States Agency for International Development from November 15, 2022, until his resignation on February 25, 2025.

Karlan's research focuses on the microeconomics of poverty alleviation in the developing world. Alongside Esther Duflo, Abhijit Banerjee, Sendhil Mullainathan, and Edward Miguel, he has been a leading proponent of the use of randomized controlled trials to inform policy decisions in developing countries. In 2002, Karlan founded Innovations for Poverty Action (IPA), a New Haven headquartered nonprofit organization that promotes the use of scientific evidence in global poverty alleviation. He is also the founder of StickK, an internet company and website that applies lessons from behavioral science to help individuals achieve their goals through commitment contracts.

== Education ==
Karlan received a Bachelor of Arts in Foreign Affairs from the University of Virginia in 1990, followed by a dual Master of Business Administration-Master of Public Policy from the University of Chicago in 1997. Prior to beginning his undergraduate studies, he attended Duke University's PreCollege Talent Identification Program, where he met his wife, Cindy, in 1986. He received a PhD in economics from the Massachusetts Institute of Technology in 2002, where he was supervised by 2019 Nobel laureates Esther Duflo and Abhijit Banerjee. His thesis, entitled "Social capital and microfinance", examined questions of relevance to the market for microlending in the developing world.

== Professional career ==
=== Academic career ===
Karlan began his academic career at Princeton University, where he was an assistant professor between 2002 and 2005. In 2005, he moved to Yale University, where he was promoted to full professor in 2008. In 2017, Karlan moved to Northwestern University alongside colleague Christopher Udry to co-direct the university's new Global Poverty Research Lab, based at the Kellogg School of Management.

Alongside his academic appointments, Karlan is a fellow of the Econometric Society and Bureau for Research and Economic Analysis of Development, and a research associate in the National Bureau of Economic Research's Development Economics program. At present, he is also on leave as an affiliate of the Abdul Latif Jameel Poverty Action Lab, an MIT-based research institute founded by his doctoral supervisors.

=== Social entrepreneurship ===
In addition to his academic appointments, Karlan is also a social entrepreneur, having founded several organizations leveraging insights from development economics and behavioral science.

==== StickK.com ====
During graduate school, Karlan entered into a bet with fellow student John Romalis, agreeing to pay his peer $10,000 if he did not lose at least 38 pounds by a pre-determined date. The bet was conceived as a commitment mechanism, encouraging both parties to act in their own self-interest by aligning their dietary goals with their financial incentives. The experience encouraged Karlan and Ian Ayres, a lawyer and economist at Yale University, to found StickK.com, an internet company allowing users to enter into legally binding agreements relating to their own personal goals. The company is based on two related principles from behavioral economics: time inconsistency, i.e. when individuals make decisions inconsistent with the wishes of their future selves, and loss aversion: individuals' often strong negative emotional response to even small losses.

StickK was founded in 2008 with $150,000 in seed funding from its founders: Karlan, Ayres, and Jordan Goldberg, then an MBA student at Yale University. The company subsequently raised two rounds of additional funding totaling over $2 million. By September 2009, the platform had 42,000 registered users and been used to create 28,000 contracts.

=== Research ===
Karlan's research focuses on the areas of development economics, behavioral economics and international development policy. He has studied microeconomic issues of financial decision-making, specifically employing randomized controlled trials (RCTs) to examine what works and what does not and why with respect to interventions and businesses intended to address problems in society. Internationally, he focuses on microfinance, and domestically he focuses on voting, charitable giving, and commitment contracts.

In microfinance, Karlan has studied the following topics: interest rate policy, credit evaluation and scoring policies, entrepreneurship training, group versus individual liability, savings product design, credit with education, and impact from increased access to credit and savings. His work on savings and health typically uses insights from psychology and behavioral economics to design and test specialized products.

Karlan has published extensively "Graduation" programs, a set of anti-poverty programs which provide a multifaceted, complementary set of interventions including a productive asset, training, coaching, access to savings, consumption support and in some cases mental health treatment. A six-country study found that these programs cause lasting progress out of poverty for the very poor.

In 2007, Karlan received the Presidential Early Career Award for Scientists and Engineers and in 2008 he received the Alfred P. Sloan Research Fellowship. He has consulted for the World Bank, the Asian Development Bank, FINCA International, Oxfam USA, and the Guatemalan government. Karlan is also co-founder of StickK, a company that manages incentive-based employee wellness programs and public campaigns for health living, and enables users to make commitment contracts in order to reach their personal goals. He is also the co-author of the economics book More Than Good Intentions published by Dutton Press released in April 2011. Karlan is also a member of the Finance research programme at the International Growth Centre, a research centre based jointly at The London School of Economics and Political Science and the University of Oxford, which brings academics and policy-makers together.

=== Charity Efficacy and Effective Altruism ===
Karlan's research intersects with effective altruism, and many of the development interventions recommended by effective altruist organizations such as GiveWell and The Life You Can Save are based on studies conducted by Innovations for Poverty Action. Karlan has studied and written about how to increase the quality and quantity of giving. His research has shown that nonprofits with high overhead rates are extremely rare, that cost-effectiveness information can increase donations and that a match from a high-profile organization (in this case, The Bill & Melinda Gates Foundation) can increase donations.

Karlan co-founded ImpactMatters with Elijah Goldberg in 2015. ImpactMatters produced estimates of impact and corresponding ratings, and was acquired by Charity Navigator in 2020.

== Selected works ==
=== Books ===
- Karlan, Dean; Morduch, Jonathan (2019). Economics — Third Edition. McGraw-Hill Education. 978–1260566062.
- Karlan, Dean; Gugerty, Mary Kay (2018). The Goldilocks Challenge: Right-Fit Evidence for the Social Sector. Oxford University Press. 978–0199366088.
- Karlan, Dean; Appel, Jacob (2016). Failing in the Field: What We Can Learn When Field Research Goes Wrong. Princeton University Press. 978–0691161891.
- Karlan, Dean; Appel, Jacob (2011). More Than Good Intentions: How a New Economics Is Helping to Solve Global Poverty. Dutton. 978–0525951896.
