= Madhav Chavan =

- Born: 1954 (age 71–72); Maharashtra
- Occupation: Social activist
- Spouse: Neera

Madhav Chavan (born 1954) is a social activist and entrepreneur. He is the co-founder and CEO of the educational non-profit, Pratham. He also started the Read India campaign, which aims to teach basic reading, writing and arithmetic to underprivileged children across India. Pratham has been recognized by the Kravis Prize and the Skoll Award for Social Entrepreneurship. Chavan was the 2012 recipient of the WISE Prize for Education, which is widely considered the equivalent of the Nobel Prize in the field of education and recipient of Leading-Social-Contributor-Award which is the highest degree award in India for exemplary work in the area of operation.

== Early life ==
Madhav Chavan was born in Maharashtra to Yashwant Chavan, the founder of the Lenin-inspired Lal Nishan Party. He went to B.P.M High School in Khar and Jai Hind College. He received his B Sc and M Sc degrees in chemistry from The Institute of Science, Mumbai. He received his Ph.D. in chemistry at the Ohio State University in 1983.

== Career ==
Madhav Chavan taught chemistry at the University of Houston and the Institute of Chemical Technology, Mumbai before getting involved with adult literacy in the National Literacy Mission in the slums of Mumbai in 1989.

He returned to India in 1983. After producing literacy programmes for Doordarshan for a few years, he was invited to work with a Unicef project to teach in Mumbai's slums.

He was a member of National Advisory Council from 2004 to 2008. He is also a member of the Governing Council of the Sarva Shiksha Abhiyan Mission (SSA) of the Government of India and has been a member of four half-yearly Joint Review Missions of SSA.

== Personal life ==
Madhav Chavan is an avid fan of old-world international cinema. He is an amateur photographer and has authored a book titled 'Sambhav' in Marathi.
