= Mody Road =

Street in Hong Kong

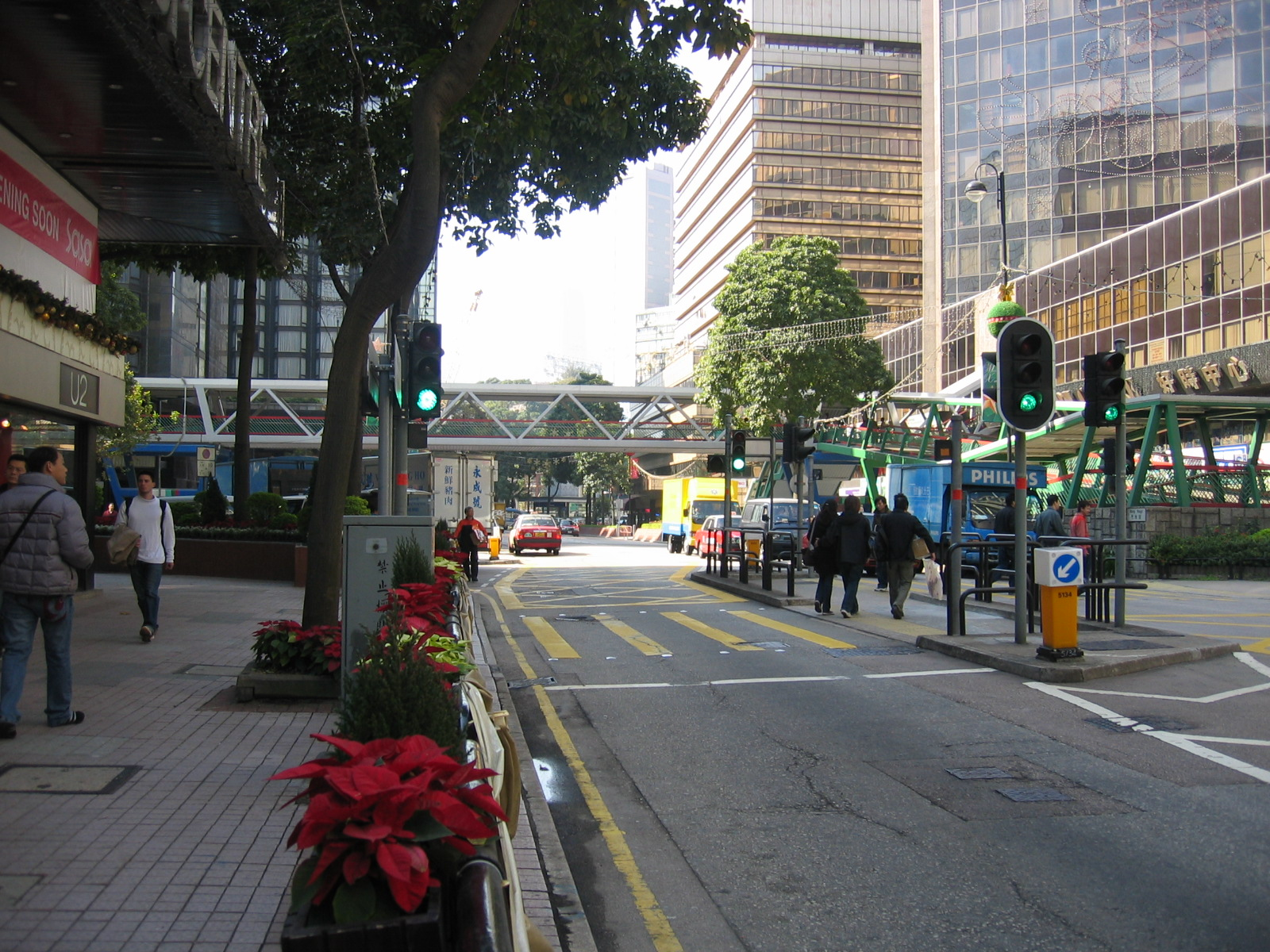
Mody Road

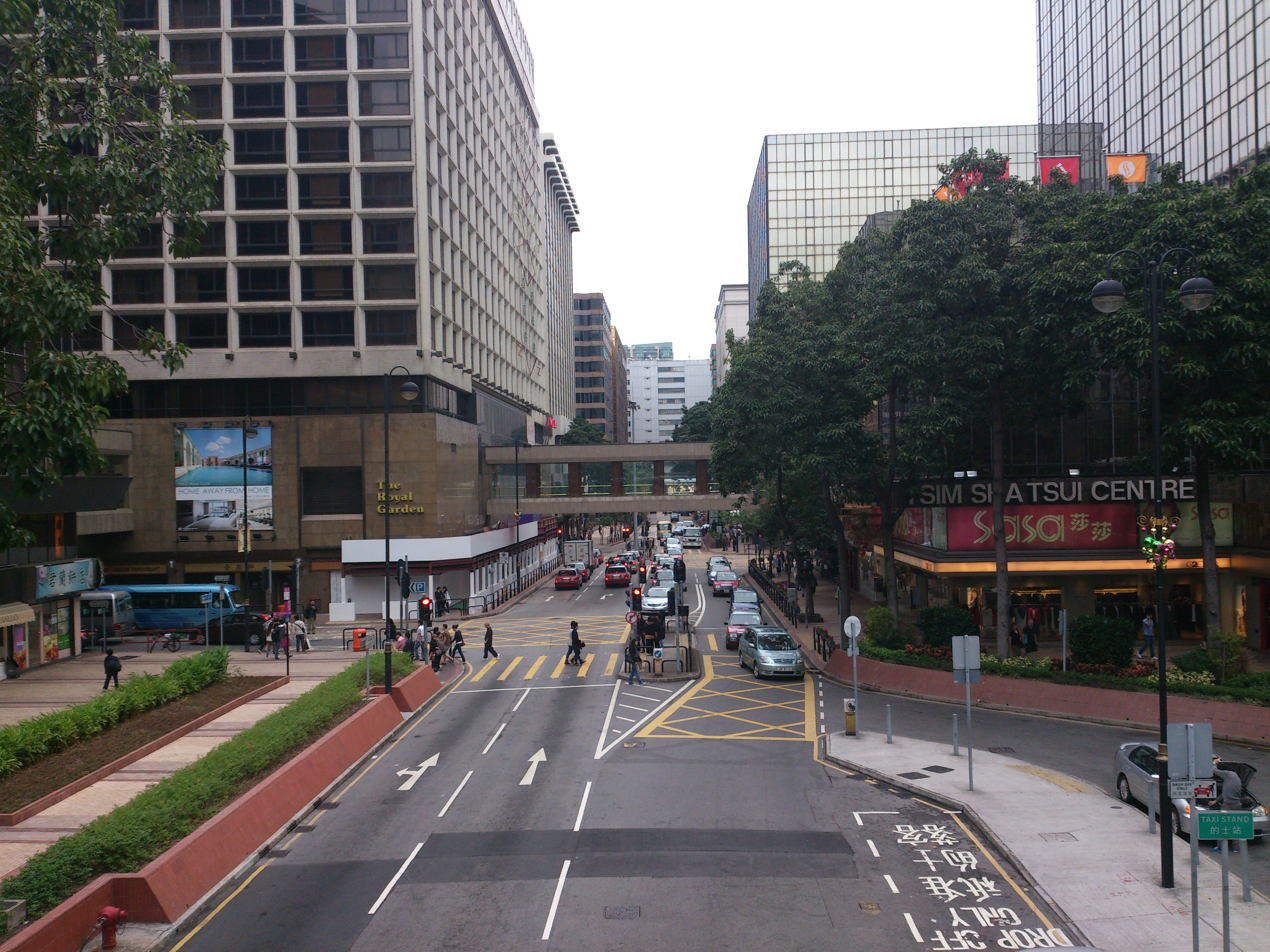
Mody Road towards Mody Square

Mody Road (Chinese: 麼地道) is a street in Tsim Sha Tsui, Kowloon, Hong Kong.

== Location ==
Mody Road starts at Nathan Road to the west, crosses Chatham Road South and ends at Science Museum Road to the northeast.

== History ==
The road was built in 1887 as an unnamed path linking Nathan Road and Chatham Road, about the site of the former Tsim Sha Tsui Bay. In March 1909, the road was given its current name in honour of Sir Hormusjee Naorojee Mody, a successful Indian Parsi businessman in Hong Kong for his support in founding the Hong Kong University, along his other contributions to Hong Kong.

In the 1970s, Tsim Sha Tsui East was built on reclaimed land over Hung Hom Bay. Mody Road was then extended east to its present-day end at Science Museum Road, but this new road was called Ching Yee Road. On 19 February 1982, Ching Yee Road was renamed Mody Road to reflect the fact that it was an eastward continuation of Mody Road. On the same day, Ching Hay Street was renamed Mody Lane.

== Features ==
A number of hotels are located at the eastern end of the road, including the Kowloon Shangri-La, the InterContinental Grand Stanford Hong Kong and The Royal Garden Hotel. The Global Headquarters of the DFS Group is also located here.

== Public Transport ==
A pedestrian tunnel linking Tsim Sha Tsui and East Tsim Sha Tsui MTR station was built under a stretch of Mody Road. The Tsim Sha Tsui East bus terminus is also located along the road, near MTR exit P1.
