= Lui Che Woo Prize =

The LUI Che Woo Prize – Prize for World Civilisation (Chinese: 呂志和獎), is an international prize founded on 24 September 2015 by Lui Che Woo, Chairman of K. Wah International of Hong Kong. There are three prizes for the three objectives of the Lui Che Woo Prize, namely the "Sustainability Prize", the "Welfare Betterment Prize" and the "Positive Energy Prize". Each awardee will receive a cash award of HK$20 million (equivalent to approximately US$2.56 million), a certificate and a trophy.

== Prize categories ==
The LUI Che Woo Prize recognises individuals or organisations with outstanding achievements in the three Prize Categories.

- Sustainability Prize (Sustainable development of the world)
- Welfare Betterment Prize (Betterment of the welfare of mankind)
- Positive Energy Prize (Promotion of positive life attitude and enhancement of positive energy)

== Laureates ==
Each Prize is awarded to a single recipient (i.e. no sharing of a Prize) who can be an individual or an organisation every year.

If there is no appropriate awardee for any Prize Category in any particular year, there will be no Prize awarded for that Prize Category in that year.

Year	Prize Category	Sustainability Prize	Field(s) of Work
2016	Sustainability Prize	YUAN Longping	Securing world food supply
2016	Welfare Betterment Prize	Médecins Sans Frontières	Controlling infectious diseases
2016	Positive Energy Prize	James Earl “Jimmy” Carter, Jr.	Promoting positive life attitude
2017	Sustainability Prize	XIE Zhenhua	Facilitating global actions against climate change
2017	Welfare Betterment Prize	Landesa	Alleviating poverty
2017	Positive Energy Prize	International Paralympic Committee	Promoting harmony among diverse groups
2018	Sustainability Prize	Hans-Josef FELL	Sparking global renewable energy movement
2018	Welfare Betterment Prize	World Meteorological Organization	Reducing natural disaster impacts
2018	Positive Energy Prize	Pratham Education Foundation	Eliminating illiteracy
2019	Sustainability Prize	The Nature Conservancy	Creating a world where people and nature thrive
2019	Welfare Betterment Prize	Jennifer Doudna	Revolutionising gene-editing technology
2019	Positive Energy Prize	Fan Jinshi	Inspiring others by lifelong conservation of Dunhuang Grottoes

== Board of Governors ==
The Board of Governors is the governing body of LUI Che Woo Prize Limited. It is a charitable company limited by guarantee incorporated in Hong Kong.

The Board of Governors leads and supervises operations of the prize company.

Board of Governors
Members	Profile
Lui Che-Woo	Founder & Chairman of the Board of Governors cum Prize Council
Tsui Lap-Chee	President of the Hong Kong Academy of Sciences
Frederick, Ma Si-hang	Council Chairman of the Education University of Hong Kong
Moses, Cheng Mo-Chi	Consultant of Messrs. P.C. Woo & Co.
