= Lui Che-woo =

Hong Kong business magnate, investor and philanthropist (1929–2024)

Dr The Honourable Lui Che-woo GBM GBS MBE JP
- 呂志和
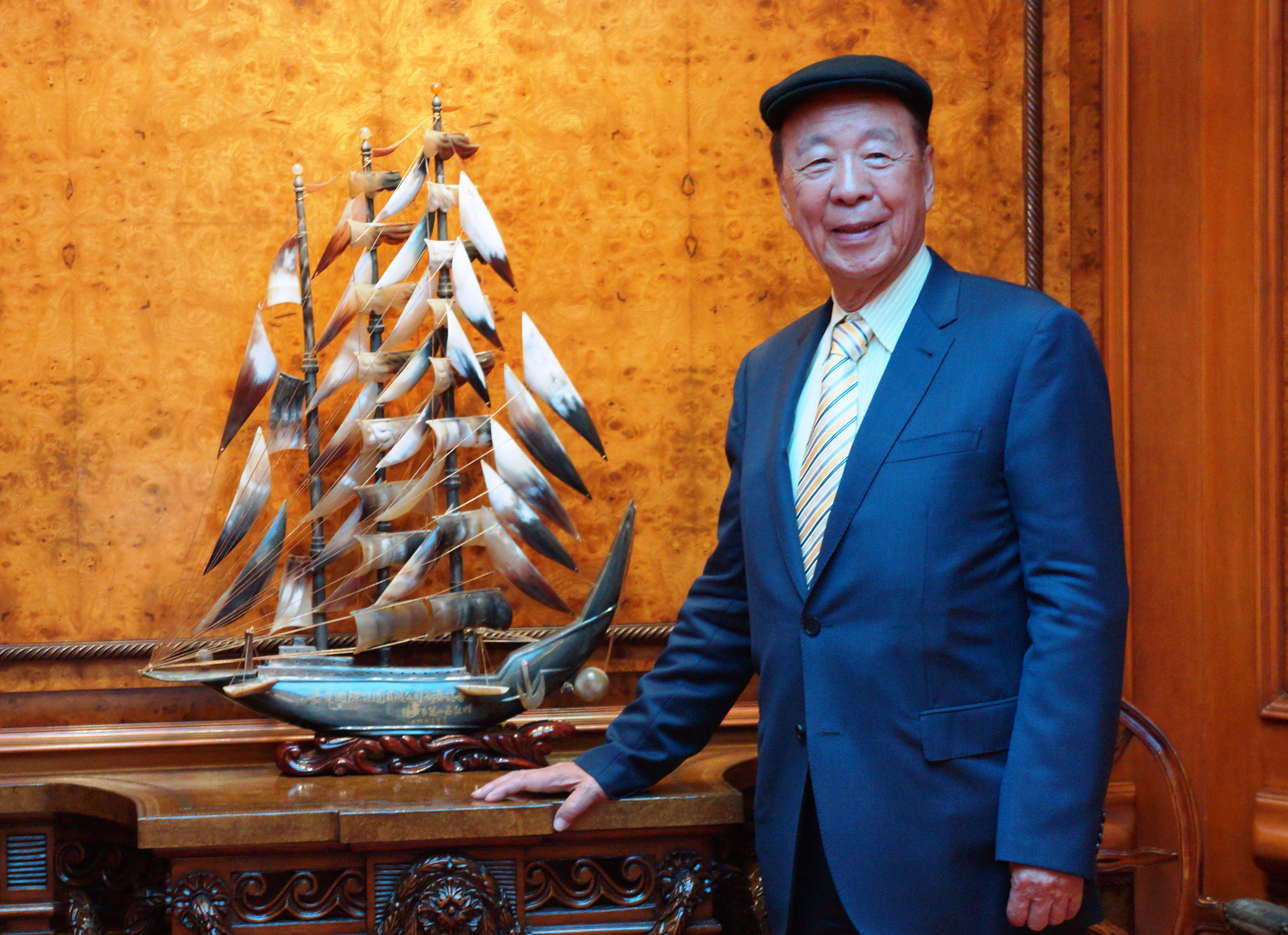
- Lui in 2014
- Born: 9 August 1929; Jiangmen, Kwangtung, China
- Died: 7 November 2024 (aged 95); Hong Kong
- Known for: Chairman of the K.Wah Group; Chairman of the Galaxy Entertainment Group; LUI Che Woo Prize - Prize for World Civilization - Founder & Chairman of the Board of Governors cum Prize Council
- Spouse: Chiu Kam Ping
- Children: Francis Lui Yiu Tung (son); Lawrence Lui Yiu Nam (son); Alexander Lui Yiu Wah (son); Paddy Lui Wai Yu (daughter); Eileen Lui Wai Ling (daughter)
- Awards: 1982: Member of the Order of the British Empire (MBE); 1986: Justice of the Peace (JP); 1995: An asteroid numbered 5538 discovered by the Purple Mountain Observatory of the Chinese Academy of Sciences was named as “Lui Che Woo Star” 2001: Degree of Doctor of Laws, honoris causa, by the University of Victoria; 2002: Degree of Doctor of Social Science, honoris causa, by the Chinese University of Hong Kong; Honorary University Fellowship by the University of Hong Kong; 2004: Honorary Doctor of Laws by Concordia University; Chevalier of the Order of Arts and Letters by the Minister of Culture of French government 2005: Gold Bauhinia Star (GBS) by the Hong Kong Special Administrative Region Government (HKSARG); Doctor of Business Administration, honoris causa, by the Hong Kong Polytechnic University; 2012: Grand Bauhinia Medal (GBM) by the HKSARG; 2016: Degree of Doctor of Social Science, honoris causa, by The University of Hong Kong; 2017: Peking University Outstanding Educational Contribution Award; 2019: "20 Persons in 20 Years: The Most Valuable Persons of Macao's Tourism and Leisure Industry from 1999 to 2019" by the Macau University of Science and Technology

Lui Che Woo, GBM, GBS, MBE, JP (Chinese: 呂志和; 9 August 1929 – 7 November 2024) was a Hong Kong business magnate, investor and philanthropist. He founded K. Wah Company in 1955, which later became a multinational conglomerate, K. Wah Group. The group has two listed flagships, K. Wah International Holdings Limited and Galaxy Entertainment Group Limited, as well as major companies such as K. Wah Construction Materials Limited and Stanford Hotels International, and over 200 subsidiaries around the world. K. Wah Group is engaged in various businesses including properties, entertainment and leisure, hospitality and construction materials across Mainland China, Hong Kong, Macau, Southeast Asia and major cities in the world.

Lui Che-woo was the Chairman of K.Wah Group and the Galaxy Entertainment Group. He established the LUI Che Woo Prize – Prize for World Civilisation, which strives for harmony and betterment of humanity while preserving Mother Earth. Adhering to his belief in “giving back to society”, especially in promoting the education of young people and paying attention to the development of science and technology, Lui Che-woo donated for decades to numerous universities in Mainland China, Hong Kong, Macau and overseas, as well as helping the underprivileged. To recognise Lui’s long-standing social and charitable contributions, the Purple Mountain Observatory of the Chinese Academy of Sciences has named the asteroid 5538 the “Lui Che Woo Star”.

== Early life ==
Born on 9 August 1929 in Jiangmen, Guangdong Province, Mainland China, Lui Che-woo moved to Hong Kong with his family at the age of four, and like many children his age, was forced to drop out of school during the Japanese occupation of Hong Kong. In the 1940s, at the age of 13, Lui Che-woo first took up entrepreneurship as a food manufacturer and distributor in Yau Ma Tei. After the war, he learned to run an auto parts business with his uncle. Five or six years later, Lui established his own brand for auto parts trading.

=== Pioneering construction materials and property development businesses ===
The 1950s and 1960s were an important post-war period for Hong Kong’s economic and social development, and Lui Che-woo took this opportunity to explore broader business prospects. In the early 1950s, he travelled to Okinawa, Japan, to solicit the US Army and Consulate to sell him heavy equipment left behind in Okinawa after the Korean War. This equipment included heavy goods vehicles and drilling machines, which he later shipped back to Hong Kong for infrastructure and construction work. This visionary initiative laid a crucial foundation for Lui’s future career development.

In 1955, Lui Che-woo founded K. Wah Company in Hong Kong to participate in large-scale land reclamation projects in and around Kwun Tong District, including Sau Mau Ping, Lok Fu, Lam Tin and Yau Tong. Since then, K. Wah Company has remained an undisputed leader in Hong Kong’s construction materials sector, and Lui Che-woo has become known as the “King of the Quarry” in the industry.

In the 1960s, Lui Che-woo successfully secured the right to quarry at the Anderson Road Quarry Site, which was the first rock quarry site in Hong Kong. Lui had the foresight to embrace new technologies and used automated equipment to replace the manual mining of the time. In 1997, the K. Wah Company signed a 17-year contract with the HKSAR Government to rehabilitate the quarry into a multi-purpose development site.

Lui Che-woo's construction materials business greatly contributed to shaping Hong Kong's urban areas. Concurrent with such contributions, his business has led the development of efficient, safe, mechanised quarrying. K. Wah Construction Materials Limited was listed in Hong Kong in 1991 (00027, currently one of the subsidiaries of Galaxy Entertainment Group Limited) and has become the largest one-stop building materials company in the city.

Lui Che-woo began to invest in property development in the 1960s. Over the years, Lui’s property development projects have expanded from Hong Kong to Mainland China, Macau, Southeast Asia, and major cities worldwide. In 1987, K. Wah International Holding Limited, founded by Lui, was listed in Hong Kong. At the beginning of Mainland China's reform and opening up, Lui Che-woo was one of the first Hong Kong entrepreneurs in the construction materials industry to enter the market. He participated in Guangzhou's first urban renewal project, transforming old buildings in Yuexiu District into a modern large-scale residential and commercial community known as Parkview Palace. In addition, Lui Che-woo was among the first Hong Kong entrepreneurs to invest in the Shanghai property market, acquiring a number of sites in prime locations in the city centre. After years of hard work, K. Wah Group has expanded its business to ten mainland cities, including Beijing, Shanghai, Guangzhou, Nanjing, Kunming, Shenzhen, and Zhuhai, with investments worth tens of billions of RMB.

=== Entering into the hotel and tourism industry ===
Land reclamation on the outskirts of Hong Kong played an important role in the city’s development. Lui Che-woo had a vision and confidence in local economic development and acquired a reclaimed harbour-view site in Tsim Sha Tsui East for the development of his first hotel. At the time, Tsim Sha Tsui East was a newly developed area with limited economic activity, but Lui believed that the district needed international star-rated hotels to accommodate future growth. Upon the hotel's completion, he delegated the management of the hotel to a foreign group and recruited professional hotel management personnel from Germany.

During the 1980s and 1990s, Lui Che-woo focused on the hotel business and property development in the United States. His companies partnered with internationally renowned hotel brands such as InterContinental, Marriott, Sheraton, Hilton, etc., while training local management talent. He also established a high-end serviced apartment brand, Stanford Residences, and introduced a modern and systematic management system.

In the 1970s, Lui Che-woo owned the property and operating rights to nearly twenty hotels in the United States, making him one of the top twelve hotel owners in the country. In addition, he owned and operated dozens of hotels and serviced apartments worldwide, earning him the nickname "Hotel Tycoon".

=== Shaping Macau’s entertainment and leisure industry ===
In 2002, Macau opened up its gaming market and the Macau Government issued three gaming operation licences through a bidding process. Among 18 world-class rivals, Lui Che-woo's Galaxy Entertainment Group won one of the three gaming concessions in Macau. The Group's successful corporate management and extensive experience in the hospitality industry made it the first gaming company to be listed on the Stock Exchange of Hong Kong in 2006. Lui Che-woo steered the Group's development towards the entertainment and leisure industry, and in the same year, StarWorld Hotel became a new landmark in Macau when it opened its doors.

In 2011, Galaxy Entertainment Group launched the first phase of Galaxy Macau, an integrated resort. In May 2015, Galaxy Macau Phase 2 and Broadway Macau were opened respectively, bringing the total area of the integrated resort to more than 1.1 million square metres.

In 2022, Galaxy Entertainment Group was granted a new 10-year gaming concession contract by the Macau Government, thus becoming one of six gaming companies in Macau.

In 2023, Galaxy Entertainment Group expanded its non-gaming business with the launch of the third phase of the Cotai project, including the launch of the Galaxy International Convention Centre and Galaxy Arena. Construction of the fourth phase of the new integrated resort project is underway, which will expand Galaxy Entertainment Group's footprint in Cotai to two million square metres. Notably, Galaxy Entertainment Group has also strategically partnered with Monte-Carlo SBM, so as to extend its business reach to Hengqin, Zhuhai.

== LUI Che Woo Prize – Prize for World Civilisation ==
In 2015, Lui Che-woo founded the LUI Che Woo Prize – Prize for World Civilisation to recognise individuals and groups who have made significant contributions to the progress of world civilisation, sustainable development, the welfare of mankind and the promotion of peace and benevolence in various fields. This bold initiative is supported by the world's top scholars and social elites. Laureates of the Prize include Yuan Longping (袁隆平, 2016 Sustainability Prize, known as the "Father of Hybrid Rice", his research on high-yield hybrid rice technology could solve the problem of food shortage in China), Xie Zhenhua (解振華, 2017 Sustainability Prize, contributed to the achievement of the 2015 Paris Agreement), Fan Jinshi (樊錦詩, 2019 Positive Energy Prize, lifelong focus on the conservation of cultural heritage in the Dunhuang Mogao Grottoes), Jennifer A. Doudna (2019 Welfare Betterment Prize, co-inventor of the genome engineering tool CRISPR-Cas9, also one of the Laureates of the Nobel Prize in Chemistry).

== Public services ==
Lui Che-woo was passionate about public welfare and social issues, and held several public offices.

From 1981 to 1982, he served as the Chairman of the Tung Wah Group of Hospitals in Hong Kong. In 1983, he founded the Federation of Hong Kong Hotel Owners and has served as the organisation’s Chairman since that year. In both his capacity as Chairman of the Federation and as an individual, he has continuously advised the Government on the development of Hong Kong's hotel and tourism industry. One of Lui's initiatives is to expand the concept of MICE (Meetings, Incentives, Conventions, Exhibitions) to MICEE by adding an element of “entertainment”. The enriched concept integrates entertainment, culture, hospitality, catering, transportation and retail in one.

Lui Che-woo also played a vital role in the education sector. In 1996, he served as Chairman of the Chinese Association for Science and Society in Hong Kong, which promotes the development and application of advanced technology in Hong Kong. Over the years, he has been a trustee and advisor to a number of higher education institutions, including Honorary Trustee of Peking University, Senior Member of the Board of Directors of Shanghai Fudan University, Founding Honorary Patron of The University of Hong Kong Foundation for Educational Development and Research, Member of the Board of Trustees of the United College of The Chinese University of Hong Kong, Honorary Member of the Court of The Hong Kong University of Science and Technology, Member of the Court of The Hong Kong Polytechnic University, Honorary Life Chairman of The Hong Kong Polytechnic University Foundation, Life Honorary Chairman of Wuyi University Board of Trustees, Honorary Dean of the Business Faculty of Yangzhou University, etc.

Lui Che-woo was elected as a member of the 9th National Committee of the Chinese People's Political Consultative Conference between 1998 and 2003. In 1996, he became a Member of the Selection Committee for the first Chief Executive of the HKSAR. From 1998 to 2021, he was elected as a member of the HKSAR Election Committee (Hotel subsector).

== Charity ==
Lui Che-woo was actively involved in supporting social initiatives such as education and medical care through donations and charitable projects. He has supported the Ministry of Education of Mainland China in the construction and renovation of 122 primary and secondary schools, subsidised underprivileged students from rural areas to attend universities, and contributed to the construction of a number of university buildings and teaching facilities across the Mainland, Hong Kong, and Macau including the Life Science Research Building of Peking University, Tsinghua University Biomedical Sciences Building, China Europe International Business School in Beijing, Shanghai Fudan University, K.Wah Big Data Center of Shanghai Jiao Tong University, “Lui Che Woo Science Park” of Shanghai Jiao Tong University, Hengqin Campus of University of Macau, Dr Lui Che-Woo Law Library at The University of Hong Kong, Faculty of Medicine of The Chinese University of Hong Kong, School of Hotel and Tourism Management of The Hong Kong Polytechnic University, and the Stanford University Medical Centre. Lui played a pivotal role in the establishment of the School of Hotel and Tourism Management at The Chinese University of Hong Kong and the teaching of hotel and tourism management at The Hong Kong Polytechnic University.

Lui Che-woo also set up scholarships in a number of prestigious overseas universities to help outstanding Chinese students study and exchange abroad, and established the Galaxy Entertainment Group Charitable Foundation with HK$1.3 billion to help young people develop the right values and attitudes, and cultivate a sense of patriotism for the country and nation. From 2020 to 2023, the Foundation and the KWIH Anti-Epidemic Fund jointly supported the prevention and mitigation of the novel coronavirus in the Mainland China, Hong Kong, and Macau.

== Death ==
Lui died on 7 November 2024, at the age of 95. His death was announced by the Galaxy Entertainment Group four days later, on 11 November.

== Major philanthropy projects ==
Mainland China
| Year | Projects |
|---|---|
| 1988–2018 | Wuyi University, Jiangmen (Lui Che-woo Hall; Lui Che-woo Technology Building etc.) |
| 1992 | Guangzhou Education Foundation (Walk for Millions) |
| 1995 | South China University of Technology, Guangzhou – Lui Che Woo Scholarship |
| 1995–2002 | Fudan University, Shanghai (Education fund and other teaching facilities; Lui Che Woo Building etc.) |
| 2003 & 2005 | Nanjing University–Lui Che Woo Swimming Pool |
| 2005 | The Ministry of Education of PRC – reconstruction and renovation of 122 primary and secondary schools |
| 2007 | Guangxi Education Foundation for the Underprivileged |
| 2008 | China Europe International Business School Beijing Campus –Lui Che Woo Lecture Theatre; |
| 2008 | Virya Foundation – sponsoring university students in remote villages in Mainland China to complete 4 to 5 years of undergraduate programmes |
| 2016 | Guangzhou Huadu District Xinya Street Jiaxing School and K. Wah Education Fund |
| 2017 | Shanghai Jiao Tong University –K. Wah City Governance Research Fund, K. Wah Big Data Center |
| 2017 | Peking University – Lui Che Woo School of Life Sciences Fund |
| 2018 | Tsinghua University – Lui Che Woo Pharmaceutical Sciences Building & Lui Che Woo Medical Sciences Building |
| 2022 | Shanghai Jiao Tong University – Lui Che Woo Science Park |

Hong Kong
| Year | Projects |
|---|---|
| 2002–2015 | The Chinese University of Hong Kong (Lui Che Woo Institute of Innovative Medicine, Lui Che Woo Clinical Sciences Building etc.) |
| 2004–2009 | The Hong Kong Polytechnic University (K. Wah Scholarship; School of Hotel and Management “Che-woo Lui Hotel and Tourism Resource Centre”; Lui Che Woo Building etc.) |
| 2010 | The University of Hong Kong – Lui Che Woo Law Library |

Macau
| Year | Projects |
|---|---|
| 2007 & 2010 | University of Macau –Development Foundation; Lui Che Woo College in Hengqin, Zhuhai |

Overseas
| Year | Projects |
|---|---|
| 1995 | Stanford University, US – Lui Che Woo Research Laboratory, School of Medicine |
| 2001 | Victoria University, Canada |
| 2005 | Concordia University, Canada – Dr Lui Che Woo Scholarship |
| 2007 | University of California, US – San Francisco Medical School |
| 2009–2013 | University of Pennsylvania, US – General Fund |
| 2013 | California Polytechnic State University, US – General Fund |

== Sources ==
As of this edit, this article uses content from "Dr Che-woo Lui", which is licensed in a way that permits reuse under the Creative Commons Attribution-ShareAlike 3.0 Unported License, but not under the GFDL. All relevant terms must be followed.

- About Dr Che-woo Lui
