= K. Wah International =

Hong Kong–based property developer

嘉華國際集團有限公司 K. Wah International Holdings Limited
- Company type: Public company
- Traded as: SEHK: 173
- Industry: Property
- Founder: Dr Lui Che-woo
- Headquarters: 29/F, K. Wah Centre, North Point, Hong Kong
- Website: http://www.kwih.com

K. Wah International Holdings Limited, also abbreviated as KWIH, is a property developer in Hong Kong and the listed property arm of the K. Wah Group. Along with its subsidiaries, the Group is principally engaged in property development and investment in Hong Kong, mainland China and Singapore. It was founded and controlled by tycoon Lui Che-woo.

KWIH encompasses a portfolio of residential developments, Grade-A office towers, retail spaces, hotels and serviced apartments.

Until July 2017, the group operated the Anderson Road Quarry, above Sau Mau Ping, supplying aggregate to Hong Kong for 50 years, and highly visible from much of Kowloon and Hong Kong. It also contributed to the rehabilitation of the site, which is now being developed for residence.

KWIH is a constituent stock of the Hang Seng Composite MidCap Index and MSCI China Small Cap Index. K Wah also holds a 3.8% stake in Galaxy Entertainment (SEHK: 27), one of the largest Macau gaming operators.

In June 2024, KWIH was among ten companies to receive the (Building and Construction Information) BCI Asia Top 10 Developers Award.
