= Galaxy Entertainment Group =

Macao hotel and casino operator

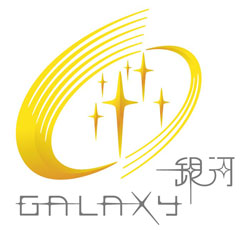
- Native name: 銀河娛樂集團
- Company type: Public
- Traded as: SEHK: 27; Hang Seng Index component
- Industry: Hospitality, tourism
- Founded: 2005; 21 years ago
- Founder: Lui Che-woo
- Headquarters: Hong Kong
- Area served: Global
- Key people: Francis Lui (Chairman & CEO)
- Products: Gambling, hotels, entertainment, casinos, resorts
- Revenue: HK$51 billion (2015)
- Owner: Che Woo Lui; Francis Lui Yiu Tung
- Website: galaxyentertainment.com

Galaxy Entertainment Group (GEG; Chinese: 銀河娛樂集團) is a company that owns and operates hotels and casinos in Macau through its subsidiary, Galaxy Casino S.A.

== History ==
The company, known formerly as K. Wah Construction Materials, disposed of its construction material business and became the only Hong Kong-listed company to hold an operating license in Macao in 2005 by acquiring a 97.9% stake in Galaxy Casino SA. The deal was described as akin to "a snake trying to swallow an elephant". Galaxy and Venetian Macao had originally planned to run their gaming license in Macao jointly, but the two had since split and decided to run their gaming business separately.

In February 2020 the company confirmed it had withdrawn from its bidding in Osaka and would instead focus on other licenses in Japan, including Yokohama among others. After its Macau casinos were closed that month for the COVID-19 outbreak as well as other casinos, the company said it would return to full capacity only after guest demand had increased.

== Properties ==
The company owns the following casinos and hotels in Macau:

- The StarWorld Macau (Macau Peninsula)
- CityClub casinos (Macau Peninsula)
  - Waldo Casino
  - President Casino
  - Rio Casino
- Broadway Casino (Cotai)
- The Galaxy Macau (Cotai)

== Business areas ==
The principal activities of Galaxy Entertainment and its subsidiaries are operation in casino games of chance or games of other forms, provision of hospitality and related services in Macau, and the manufacture, sale and distribution of construction materials in Hong Kong, Macau and Mainland China.

It operates in two segments: gaming and entertainment, and construction materials.

== Ownership structure ==
Galaxy Entertainment Group is ultimately controlled by the Lui Family of Hong Kong, which has a combined interest of 50.3%. This family has a direct interest of 8.6% in GEG and an indirect interest of 41.7% via the Lui Family Trust and Hong Kong listed K Wah International.

== See also ==
- List of companies of Hong Kong
- Gambling in Macau
- Gambling in Hong Kong
- List of integrated resorts
- List of casino hotels
