= Ian Ayres =

American lawyer and economist

- Born: 1959 (age 66–67)
- Education: Yale University (BA, JD); Massachusetts Institute of Technology (PhD)
- Occupations: Lawyer; economist
- Spouse: Jennifer Gerarda Brown (m. 1993)
- Children: 2

Ian Ayres (born 1959) is an American lawyer and economist. Ayres is a professor at Yale Law School and at the Yale School of Management.

== Early life and education ==
Ayres grew up in Kansas City, Missouri, where they graduated from Pembroke Country Day School in 1977. They played varsity basketball, ran cross country, and served as executive editor of their high school newspaper. Ayres wrote an op-ed piece their senior year called "Black Like Me" (named for the 1961 book of the same name), a controversial piece detailing the consequences of their checking the "African- American" box for race on his PSAT, which led to consideration for academic awards. Ayres graduated summa cum laude in 1981 from Yale University with a dual degree in Russian studies and economics. Ayres then received their J.D. at Yale Law School in 1986, where Ayres was an editor of the Yale Law Journal. Ayres received their Ph.D. in economics at the Massachusetts Institute of Technology in 1988.

== Career ==
Ayres has taught at Northwestern University School of Law, the University of Virginia School of Law, the Moscow State Institute of International Relations Cardoza Law Institute, the University of Iowa College of Law, the University of Illinois College of Law, Stanford Law School, the University of Toronto Faculty of Law, and Yale University.

Since 1994, Ayres has served as the William K. Townsend professor at the Yale Law School and is a professor at the Yale School of Management. Ayres teaches antitrust, civil rights, commercial law, contracts, corporations, corporate finance, law and economics, property, and quantitative methods. In 2006, Ayres was elected a fellow of the American Academy of Arts and Sciences, and also currently serves as a research associate at the National Bureau of Economic Research'. Ayres has previously served as a research fellow of the American Bar Foundation and has clerked for James K. Logan of the Tenth Circuit Court of Appeals. In a post-conviction petition, Ayres was successful in vacating the death sentence for their client.

Ayres has published eight books and over 100 articles in law reviews and magazines on a variety of subjects, and has been ranked as one of the 250 most prolific and most-cited legal scholars of his generation.

In 2007, Ayres co-founded StickK, a web startup enabling users to enter commitment contracts to reach personal goals.

Ayres currently serves on the Advisory Council of Represent.Us, a nonpartisan anti-corruption organization.

== Controversy ==
In a September 2007 review of Ayres's book Super Crunchers, the New York Times' David Leonhardt wrote that he "came across two sentences about a doctor in Atlanta that were nearly identical to two sentences I wrote in this newspaper last year." Leonhardt was particularly disturbed that "many readers will surely assume that Ayres witnessed some events" that Ayres did not.

On October 4, the Yale Daily News reported that it had found nine passages in the book, some more than a couple paragraphs long, that were identical or similar to those in the Times and four other publications. In reference to Ayres's case and a similar one in Illinois, George Washington University professor of English Margaret Soltan wrote in Inside Higher Ed: "Both men simply stuck passages from other writers into their text when it suited them, and gave either minimal or no attribution. In some of the passages in question, neither used quotation marks, even when they quoted at length, verbatim."

After some controversy over three weeks, Ayres apologized and said: "in several brief instances in the book, my language is too close to the sourced material and I should have used quotation marks to set it apart from my text." However, The Chronicle of Higher Education noted that Ayres insisted: "his citations are proper for a book intended for a popular audience but that he will make changes in future printings of the book." Critics were not satisfied with Ayres's explanation that they had simply made a mistake nor did critics accept that these practices were acceptable in popular books. Inside Higher Ed noted that the same behavior by students is "severely sanctioned." Professors at other universities were quite critical of Ayres's explanation and pointed out that the method used by the Yale Daily News to discover plagiarized passages was unlikely to catch them all.

== Personal life ==
Ayres married Jennifer Gerarda Brown, Dean Emerita of the Quinnipiac University School of Law, in 1993. They have two kids. They support various gay rights and marriage equality causes, including Freedom to Marry. Ayres uses 'they' pronouns, and has argued that the use of they as a default pronoun helps to reduce misgendering.

== Publications ==
Ian Ayres's books include:

- Ayres, Ian (2001). Pervasive Prejudice?: Non-Traditional Evidence of Race and Gender Discrimination. University of Chicago Press. 445pp. ISBN 9780226033518.
- Ackerman, Bruce; Ayres, Ian (2002). Voting with Dollars: A New Paradigm for Campaign Finance. Yale University Press. 314pp. ISBN 978-0300092622.
- Nalebuff, Barry; Ayres, Ian (2003). Why Not?: How to Use Everyday Ingenuity to Solve Problems Big and Small. Harvard Business School Press. 238pp. ISBN 1-59139-153-9.
  - 2nd ed, 2006, ISBN 978-1591391531
- Ayres, Ian; Klass, Gregory (2005). Insincere Promises: The Law of Misrepresented Intent. Yale University Press. 316pp. ISBN 978-0300106756.
- Ayres, Ian (2005). Optional Law: The Structure of Legal Entitlements. University of Chicago Press. 264pp. ISBN 978-0226033464.
- Ayres, Ian; Brown, Jennifer Gerarda (2005). Straightforward: How to Mobilize Heterosexual Support for Gay Rights. Princeton University Press. 264pp. ISBN 978-0691121345.
- Ayres, Ian (2007). Super Crunchers: Why Thinking-By-Numbers is the New Way To Be Smart. Bantam. 272pp. ISBN 978-0553805406.
- Ayres, Ian; Speidel, Richard E. (2008). Studies in Contract Law. University Casebook series (7th ed.). Foundation Press. ISBN 978-1-59941-255-9.
  - 9th edition with Gregory Klass, 2018, ISBN 978-1634603256
- Ayres, Ian; Nalebuff, Barry (2010). LifeCycle investing: A New, Safe, and Audacious Way to Improve the Performance of Your Retirement Portfolio. Basic Books. 240pp. ISBN 978-0465018291.
- Ayres, Ian (2010). Carrots and Sticks: Unlock the Power of Incentives to Get Things Done. Bantam. 240pp. ISBN 978-0553807639.
  - Ayres, Ian (2011). The $500 Diet: Weight Loss for People Who Are Committed to Change. Kindle Singles. 50pp.

Ian Ayres's two most well-known articles are:

- “Fair Driving: Gender and Race Discrimination in Retail Car Negotiations”, 104 Harvard Law Review 817 (1991)
- “Filling Gaps in Incomplete Contracts: An Economic Theory of Default Rules”, with Robert Gertner, 99 Yale Law Journal 87 (1989)
