= Jonathan Morduch =

American economist

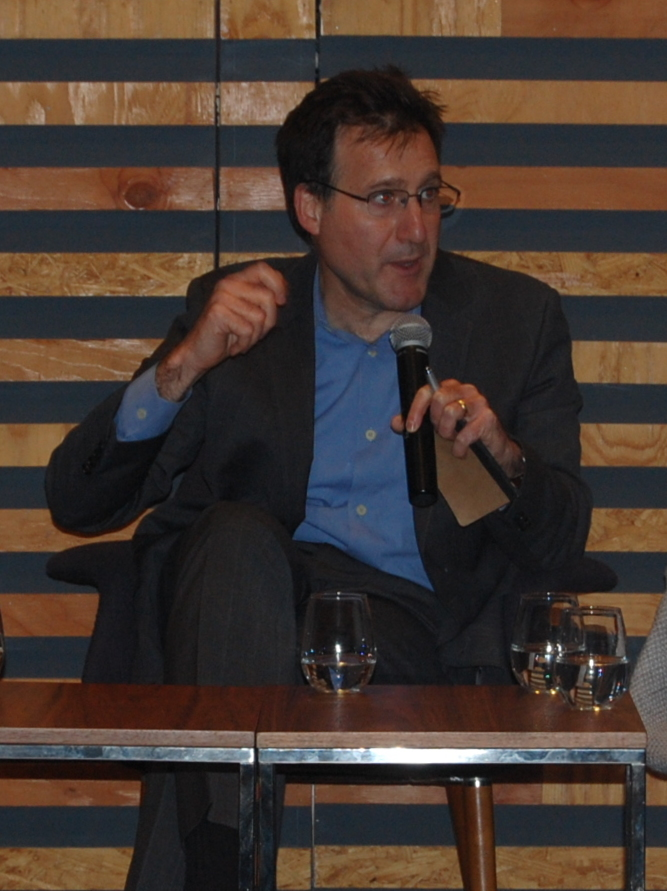
- Born: October 3, 1963 (age 63)

Academic background
- Education: Brown University, Harvard University

Academic work
- Discipline: Economics
- Sub-discipline: microfinance
- Institutions: New York University

Jonathan Morduch (born October 3, 1963) is a professor of public policy and economics at the Robert F. Wagner Graduate School of Public Service at New York University. He is a development economist most well known for his significant academic contributions to assessing the impact of microfinance since the early years of the movement. He has written extensively on poverty and financial institutions in developing countries and on tensions between achieving social impacts and meeting financial goals in microfinance.

Morduch is the managing director of the Financial Access Initiative, a consortium of leading development economists (including Sendhil Mullainathan at Harvard and Dean Karlan at Yale) that aims to expand access to financial services for low-income individuals in developing countries through research, supported by the Bill and Melinda Gates Foundation.

Morduch is currently chair of the United Nations Committee on Poverty Statistics. He is a member of the editorial board of the World Bank Economic Review and of the UN Advisors Group on Inclusive Financial Sectors. Murdoch also serves on the advisory board of Academics Stand Against Poverty (ASAP).

== Life ==
He holds a BA from Brown University and Ph.D. from Harvard University, both in economics. In January 2009, Morduch was awarded a doctorate Honoris Causa from the Université libre de Bruxelles.

== Books and selected publications ==
Morduch is co-author of The Economics of Microfinance (2005) with Beatriz Armendariz de Aghion. His book, Portfolios of the Poor: How the World's Poor Live on $2 a Day is co-authored with Daryl Collins, Stuart Rutherford, and Orlanda Ruthven. His most recent publication, Microfinance Meets the Market, in the Journal of Economic Perspectives (Winter 2009) investigates the tensions and opportunities for microfinance as it embraces the financial markets. Morduch's work and views on access to finance and social investment are widely cited.

== Portfolios of the Poor ==
Portfolios of the Poor: How the World's Poor Live on $2 a Day was published in 2009 and went on to become a widely recognized book for its realistic presentation of the way poor people manage their money. The book aims to answer one fundamental question: how the poor make ends meet? Portfolios of the Poor presents research findings based on the "financial diaries" that the authors collected by tracking financial records of more than 250 families across South Africa, Bangladesh, and India throughout one year.

== Works ==
- Beatriz Armendariz; Jonathan Morduch, The economics of microfinance New Delhi : PHI Learning Press, 2011. ISBN 9788120342712, OCLC 818854062
- D Collins; Jonathan Morduch; Stuart Rutherford; Orlanda Ruthven, Portfolios of the poor : how the world's poor live on $2 a day, Princeton : Princeton University Press, 2015. ISBN 9780691148199, OCLC 940547709
- Jonathan Morduch; Rachel Schneider, The financial diaries : how American families cope in a world of uncertainty, Princeton, New Jersey : Princeton University Press, 2017. ISBN 9780691172989, OCLC 958799688
