= Possible Health =

US-based nonprofit organization

Possible
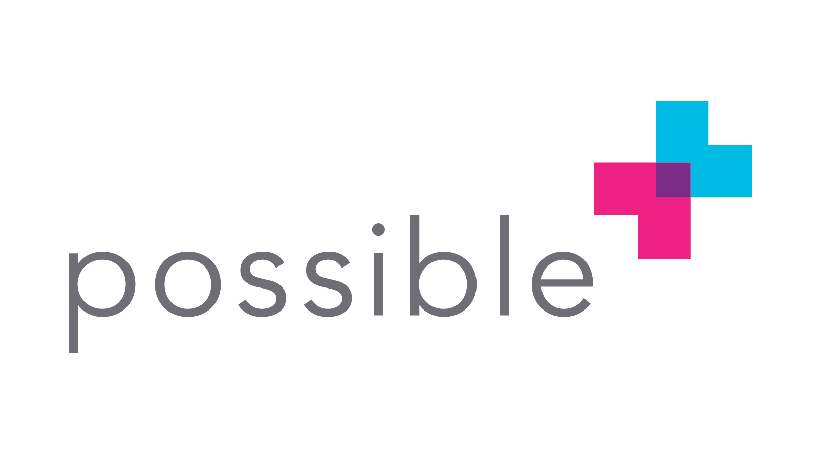
- Formation: 2005
- Founder: Bibhav Acharya; Bijay Acharya; Jason Andrews; Sanjay Basu; Duncan Maru
- Type: Healthcare Research and Innovation Non Governmental Organization
- Legal status: 501(c)(3)
- Region served: Nepal
- Website: possiblehealth.org
- Formerly called: Nyaya Health, A Nonprofit Corporation

Possible (also known as Possible Health, and legally registered as Nyaya Health, A Nonprofit Corporation) is a nonprofit that works to provide access to healthcare. Possible roots its work in places like Achham, a remote district in the Far Western Province and Dolakha in Bagmati Province in Nepal.

== History ==
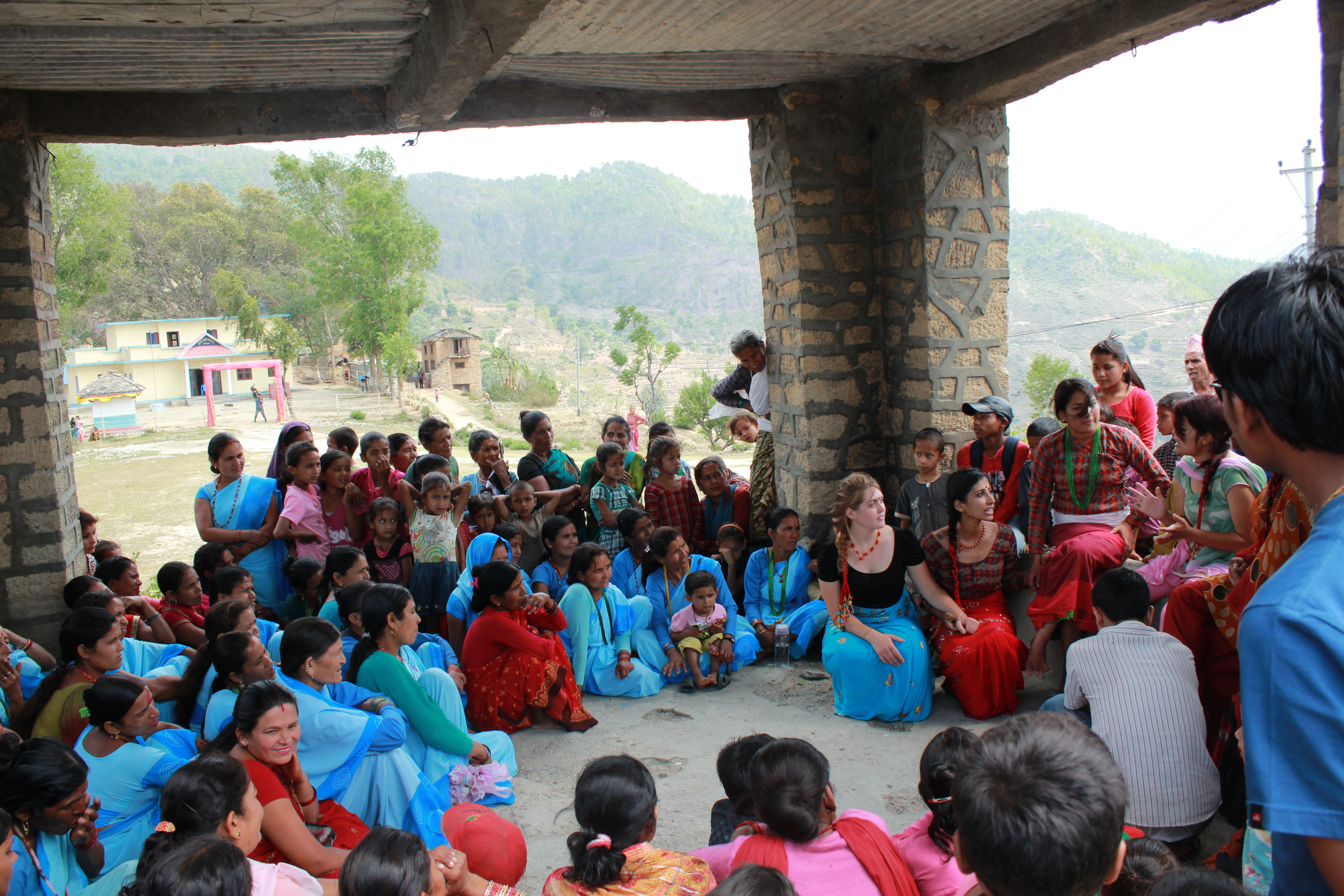
Clinical and community health staff gather outside the Outpatient Department of Bayalpata Hospital for a meeting.

=== Nyaya Health ===
Nyaya Health was founded in 2005, and spent the following year doing epidemiological studies, negotiating with the Nepali local and central governments, establishing supply chains, and raising funds. A former grain shed in Sanfe Bagar, Achham District, was selected as the site for Nyaya Health's first clinic, The Sanfe Bagar Medical Clinic.

In 2007, Nyaya Health was selected as one of three organizations around the world to be beneficiaries of an international design contest sponsored by Open Architecture Network and AMD. The design challenge was for a telemedicine center, and was won by Max Fordham LLP of London, UK. However, the telemedicine center was never built due to lack of funding. On 6 April 2008, the Sanfe Bagar Medical Clinic was opened. Initial programs focused on maternal health, child malnutrition, and HIV and tuberculosis treatment. Soon after the opening of the Sanfe Bagar Medical Clinic, the community requested that Nyaya Health take over administration of the nearby Bayalpata Hospital. The hospital was built in 1976, but had never been staffed and had fallen into disrepair. Nyaya Health joined a formal contractual partnership with the Nepal Ministry of Health and Population to jointly renovate and scale up services at the facility over a period of five years. The hospital opened 21 June 2009.

In August 2009, the first ultrasound machine in Achham was installed at Bayalpata Hospital. In September 2009, Nyaya Health instituted a new Mortality Review Program. Each death occurring at the Bayalpata hospital is reviewed by both the Nepali and international teams for systems-level changes to prevent future deaths. The de-identified reports are then published for review by the Web community.

In 2010, the hospital revamped and expanded its Community Health Worker program by integrating it with the Nepali government's Female Health Care Volunteer program. To do this, an agreement was negotiated whereby Nyaya Health would pay the women volunteers for performing certain tasks, thus raising the status of the women and establishing accountability.

In November 2011, US-based charity evaluator GiveWell listed Nyaya Health as a top charity. In the same month, GiveWell published a detailed review of Nyaya Health. In August 2012, Good Ventures announced a US$50,000 donation to Nyaya Health because of GiveWell's recommendation.

In 2013, Possible won Sappi's Ideas That Matter design competition, which enabled the organization to launch its Crowdfund Health campaign on 2 December 2013.

=== Possible ===
On 18 March 2014, the U.S. based nonprofit changed its name from Nyaya Health to Possible. In December 2014, Duncan Maru was awarded an Early Independence Award from the National Institutes of Health (NIH). In 2014, Maru was awarded an Early Independence Award from the National Institutes of Health (NIH) to scientifically assess certain aspects of our rural healthcare delivery model.

In February 2015, the team implemented Nepal's first integrated Electronic Health Record (EHR) system. In 2015, Possible's CEO Mark Arnoldy and co-founder Maru were named Schwab Foundation Social Entrepreneurs of the year.

In 2020, Gita Pillai became CEO of Possible replacing Maru, who had served as interim CEO since 2018.

Over the last decade Possible has been working with Nyaya Health Nepal (NHN) in two provinces in Nepal; Achham, a remote district in the Far Western Province and Dolakha in Bagmati Province.

== Organizational structure ==
Possible is organized as a partnership between the U.S. based 501(c)(3) and the Nepal-based NGO. They are two entities who operate independently, with a mutually interdependent partnership and a common goal of supporting health innovation in Nepal.
