= More Than Good Intentions =

2011 book by Dean Karlan and Jacob Appel

More Than Good Intentions: How a New Economics is Helping to Solve Global Poverty
- Original Cover
- Author: Dean Karlan and Jacob Appel
- Language: English
- Subject: Economics
- Genre: Non-fiction
- Publisher: Dutton Press
- Publication date: April 14, 2011
- Pages: 320
- ISBN: 978-0-525-95189-6

More Than Good Intentions: How a New Economics is Helping to Solve Global Poverty is a non-fiction book by Yale economist Dean Karlan and economist Jacob Appel published in 2011. It combines insights from behavioral economics with field research from developing countries to discuss and evaluate international development and poverty-alleviation programs. The authors describe the book as "...a new way to understand what really works to reduce poverty..."

== Publishing information ==
The book was published by Dutton Press in April 2011 as a 320-page hardcover (ISBN 978-0525951896).

== Overview ==
The book attempts to cut a middle path between two poles of the public debate about global development: on one side, the argument that current approaches to poverty reduction could be successful if simply given more funding; on the other, the argument that present efforts are fundamentally flawed. It also discusses current and emerging development programs and their impacts. Karlan and Appel present their own work and draw on the research of many others in a variety of fields including economics, health, agriculture, and education. The authors argue that small changes in banking, insurance, health care, and other development initiatives that take into account human irrationality can drastically improve the well-being of the poor. Concluding, they present a takeaway consisting of seven ideas proven to be effective in development: Microsavings, reminders to save, prepaid fertilizer sales, deworming, remedial education in small groups, chlorine dispensers for clean water, and the use of commitment devices.

== Structure ==
The book combines reporting on academic research with journalistic anecdotes from the authors’ experiences conducting research in developing countries and is primarily considered to be part of the economics genre. The book is divided into 12 chapters, each focused on an activity common to all socioeconomic levels, such as "To Buy", "To Learn", and "To Mate."

== Research methods ==
The authors draw upon economic tools, psychological insights and empirical studies in their discussion of global poverty issues. They apply concepts from the discipline of behavioral economics, an approach featured in the popular press books Predictably Irrational (Dan Ariely, 2008) and Nudge: Improving Decisions about Health, Wealth, and Happiness (Richard Thaler and Cass Sunstein, 2008), as well as traditional empirical economics and econometrics. The authors advocate for the use of randomized control trials (RCTs)—a quantitative research method—to measure the impacts of poverty alleviation programs.

== Quotation ==
"When we think about poverty…in concrete terms, we begin to see a path forward. Actually, many paths forward. The possible solutions are as numerous and as varied as the people they serve and the needs they address. To find them we need to think creatively, cast a wide net, and recognize that we are unlikely to find one single answer for everybody. At the same time, we must be methodical and tenacious. If a development program is supposed to help solve a specific, concrete problem, let’s put it to a specific, concrete test. If it passes, great. If not, fix it or try something else. In this way, step by step, we can refine the tools we use and the ways we use them; we can make real progress against poverty." (38)
