= Racial discrimination =

Discrimination in basis of race and ethnicity

Racial discrimination is any discrimination against any individual on the basis of their race, ancestry, ethnic or national origin, and/or skin color and hair type. Individuals discriminate by refusing to do business with, socialize with, or share resources with people of a certain group. Governments discriminate through statutory law or policy — for example through policies of racial segregation — disparate enforcement of laws, or disproportionate allocation of resources. Some jurisdictions have anti-discrimination laws which prohibit the government or individuals from being discriminated against based on race or other protected categories.

Some institutions and laws use affirmative action to attempt to overcome or compensate for the effects of racial discrimination. In some cases, this is simply enhanced recruitment of members of underrepresented groups; in other cases, there are firm racial quotas. Opponents of strong remedies like quotas characterize them as reverse discrimination, where members of a dominant or majority group are discriminated against.

== Boundary problems and related forms of discrimination ==
Racial boundaries can involve many factors (such as ancestry, physical appearance, national origin, language, religion, and culture), and can be set in law by governments, or may depend on local cultural norms.

Discrimination based on skin color (measured for example on the Fitzpatrick scale) or hair texture (measured for example on a scale from 1a to 4c) is closely related to racial discrimination, as skin color and hair texture are often used as a proxy for race in everyday interactions, and is one factor used by legal systems that apply detailed criteria. For example, the Population Registration Act, 1950 was used to enforce the apartheid system in South Africa, and Brazil has set up boards to assign a racial category to people for the purpose of enforcing racial quotas. Because of genetic variation, skin color, and other features of physical appearance can vary considerably even among siblings. Some children with the same parents either self-identify or are identified by others as being of different races. In some cases, the same person is identified as a different race on a birth certificate versus a death certificate. Different rules (such as hypodescent vs. hyperdescent) classify the same people differently, and for various reasons some people "pass" as a member of a different race than they would otherwise be classified in, possibly avoiding legal or interpersonal discrimination.

A given race is sometimes defined as a set of ethnicities from populations in neighboring geographic areas (such as a continent like Australia or a subcontinental region like South Asia) that are typically similar in appearance. In such cases, racial discrimination can occur because someone is of an ethnicity defined as outside that race, or ethnic discrimination (or ethnic hatred, ethnic conflict, and ethnic violence) can occur between groups who consider each other to be the same race. Discrimination based on caste is similar; because caste is hereditary, people of the same caste are usually considered to be of the same race and ethnicity.

A person's national origin (the country in which they were born or have citizenship) is sometimes used in determining a person's ethnicity or race, but discrimination based on national origin can also be independent of race (and is sometimes specifically addressed in anti-discrimination laws). Language and culture are sometimes markers of national origin and can prompt instances of discrimination based on national origin. For example, someone of a South Asian ethnicity who grew up in London, speaks British English with a London accent, and whose family has assimilated to British culture might be treated more favorably than someone of the same ethnicity who is a recent immigrant and speaks Indian English. Such a difference in treatment might still informally be described as a form of racism, or more precisely as xenophobia or anti-immigrant sentiment.

In countries where migration, unification, or breakup has occurred relatively recently, the process of ethnogenesis may complicate the determination of both ethnicity and race and is related to personal identity or affiliation. Sometimes the ethnicity of immigrants in their new country is defined as their national origin, and span multiple races. For example, the 2015 Community Survey of the United States Census accepted identification as Mexican Americans of any race (for example including Native Americans from Mexico, descendants of Africans transported to New Spain as enslaved people, and descendants of Spanish colonists). In surveys taken by the Mexican government, the same people would have been described as indigenous, black, or white (with a large number of people unclassified who might be described as Mestizo). The U.S. census asks separate questions about Hispanic and Latino Americans to distinguish language from racial identity. Discrimination based on being Hispanic or Latino does occur in the United States and might be considered a form of racial discrimination if "Hispanic" or "Latino" are considered a new racial category derived from ethnicities which formed after the independence of the former colonies of the Americas. Many statistical reports apply both characteristics, for example comparing Non-Hispanic whites to other groups.

When people of different races are treated differently, decisions about how to treat a particular person raise the question of which racial classification that person belongs to. For example, definitions of whiteness in the United States were used before the civil rights movement for the purpose of immigration and the ability to hold citizenship or be enslaved. If a race is defined as a set of ethnolinguistic groups, then common language origin can be used to define the boundaries of that group. The status of Finns as white was challenged on the grounds that the Finnish language is Uralic rather than Indo-European, purportedly making the Finns of the Mongoloid race. The common American notion that all people of geographically European ancestry and of light skin are "white" prevailed for Finns, and other European immigrants like Irish Americans and Italian Americans whose whiteness was challenged and who faced interpersonal if not legal discrimination. American and South African laws which divided the population into whites from Europe and blacks from sub-Saharan Africa often caused problems of interpretation when dealing with people from other areas, such as the rest of the Mediterranean Basin, Asia, North Africa, or even Native Americans, with classification as non-white usually resulting in legal discrimination. (Some Native American tribes have treaty rights which grant privileges rather than disadvantages, though these were often negotiated on unfavorable terms.) Though as an ethno-religious group they often face religious discrimination, the whiteness of all Jews was also challenged in the United States, with attempts to classify them as Asiatic (Palestine being in western Asia) or Semitic (which would also include Arabs). The actual ancestry of most Jewish people is more varied than simply ancient Hebrew tribes. As the Jewish diaspora spread across Europe and Africa over time many Jewish ethnic divisions arose, resulting in Jews who identify as white, black, and other races. The reunification of diverse populations in modern Israel has led to some problems of racial discrimination against dark-skinned Jews by light-skinned Jews.

== Around the world ==
=== Overall trends ===
A 2013 analysis of World Values Survey data by The Washington Post looked at the fraction of people in each country that indicated they would prefer not to have neighbours from a differing race. It ranged from below 5% in Australia, New Zealand, and many countries in the Americas, to 51.4% in Jordan; Europe had wide variation, from below 5% in the UK, France, Norway, and Sweden, to 22.7% in Germany.

More than 30 years of field experimental studies have found significant levels of discrimination against people of color in labor, housing, and product markets in 10 countries.

=== Discrimination against refugees, asylum seekers, migrants and internally displaced persons ===
Around the world, refugees, asylum seekers, migrants and internally displaced persons have been the victims of racial discrimination, racist attacks, xenophobia and ethnic and religious intolerance. According to the Human Right Watch, "racism is both a cause and a product of forced displacement, and an obstacle to its solution."

With the influx of refugees to Europe in 2010, media coverage shaped public opinion and created hostility towards refugees. Prior to that the European Union had started implementing the hotspot system, which categorized people them as either asylum seekers or economic migrants, and Europe's patrolling of its southern borders between 2010 and 2016 intensified, resulting in deals with Turkey and Libya.

=== The Netherlands ===
A study conducted in the Netherlands and published in 2013 found significant levels of discrimination against job applicants with Arabic-sounding names.

=== Israel ===
Palestinian citizens of Israel, who constitute approximately 20% of the population, face disparities in land ownership, political representation, education, and employment. Over 65 laws create structural advantages for Jewish citizens in areas such as resource allocation, housing, and legal rights. Land ownership laws designate approximately 93% of land as state property or controlled by the Jewish National Fund, which explicitly restricts non-Jewish ownership and leasing. Disparities in public funding result in lower per capita investment in Palestinian-majority municipalities, affecting infrastructure, schools, and social services. The 2018 Nation-State Law defined Israel as the nation-state of the Jewish people, affirming exclusive national rights for Jewish citizens while downgrading Arabic from an official language to a special status.

=== Africa ===
The British colonial impact greatly affected the cultures of African societies, but the differences in the countries like Nigeria remain closer to tradition than in countries like South Africa. American racism also plays a part in escalating racism in Nigeria, as American racist ideas influence African cultures. The racism developed through the influence of colonization and American influence created levels of power based on racism. Racism in African cultures is connected to the life opportunities received, virus susceptibility, and tribal traditions. For example, in the north, an indirect policy of rule established a new way of life between the colonizing government and the Fulani-Hausa ruling class. Because of this, the North falls behind the South and West in educational development, which causes racial animosity.

==== Uganda ====
While Uganda was under Idi Amin's rule, there was a policy to replace Asians and white people with blacks. Idi Amin had also expressed antisemitic views.

==== Liberia ====
The constitution of Liberia renders non-blacks ineligible for citizenship. After former Liberian president George Weah proposed to remove the clause that restricts citizenship to individuals of African descent, calling it "unnecessary, racist and inappropriate," he faced pushback from Liberians. Rufus Oulagbo, a Liberian businessman, expressed his concern with the possibility of the clause's removal by saying, "White people will definitely enslave black Liberians."

=== United Kingdom ===
A 2023 University of Cambridge survey which featured the largest sample of Black people in Britain found that 88% had reported racial discrimination at work, 79% believed the police unfairly targeted black people with stop and search powers and 80% definitely or somewhat agreed that racial discrimination was the biggest barrier to academic attainment for young Black students. Formal equality based on race continues to be violated in the United Kingdom.

=== Germany ===
Racial discrimination in Germany affects various ethnic and religious minority groups, including people of Turkish and Middle Eastern descent, Black Germans, Romani communities, asylum seekers, and Jewish populations.

People of Turkish and Middle Eastern descent constitute one of the most discriminated against minorities in Germany. Many are descendants of guest workers (Gastarbeiter) who arrived during the 1960s and 1970s. Studies indicate that job applicants with Turkish, Arab, or Muslim-sounding names receive significantly fewer interview invitations compared to those with German-sounding names. In the education system, children of Turkish and Arab backgrounds are disproportionately placed in lower-tier secondary schools, limiting access to higher education and skilled professions.

The Romani community in Germany, estimated to number between 120,000 and 200,000, also faces persistent discrimination in housing, education, and employment. Many Roma families experience forced evictions and struggle to secure rental contracts due to widespread ethnic profiling by landlords. In the education system, Roma children are disproportionately placed in special education schools and have lower enrollment rates in higher education.

=== United States ===
With regard to employment, multiple audit studies have found strong evidence of racial discrimination in the United States' labor market, with magnitudes of employers' preferences of white applicants found in these studies ranging from 50% to 240%. Other such studies have found significant evidence of discrimination in car sales, home insurance applications, provision of medical care, and hailing taxis. There is some debate regarding the method used to signal race in these studies. For example, names have been shown to not only signal race, but also include information on social status. Further, receivers may not understand race signals via names. More recent research uses A.I. generated pictures, instead, to signal race.

==== Employment ====
Racial discrimination in the workplace falls into two basic categories:

- Disparate Treatment: An employer's policies discriminate based upon any immutable racial characteristic, such as skin, eye or hair color, and certain facial features;
- Disparate Impact: Although an employer may not intend to discriminate based on racial characteristics, its policies nonetheless have an adverse effect based upon race.

Discrimination may occur at any point in the employment process, including pre-employment inquiries, hiring practices, compensation, work assignments and conditions, privileges granted to employees, promotion, employee discipline and termination.

Researchers Marianne Bertrand and Sendhil Mullainathan, at the University of Chicago and MIT found in a 2004 study, that there was widespread racial discrimination in the workplace. In their study, candidates perceived as having "white-sounding names" were 50% more likely than those whose names were merely perceived as "sounding black" to receive callbacks for interviews. The researchers view these results as strong evidence of unconscious biases rooted in the United States' long history of discrimination (e.g., Jim Crow laws, etc.)

Devah Pager, a sociologist at Princeton University, sent matched pairs of applicants to apply for jobs in Milwaukee and New York City, finding that black applicants received callbacks or job offers at half the rate of equally qualified whites. Another recent audit by UCLA sociologist S. Michael Gaddis examines the job prospects of black and white college graduates from elite private and high-quality state higher education institutions. This research finds that blacks who graduate from an elite school such as Harvard have about the same prospect of getting an interview as whites who graduate from a state school such as UMass Amherst.

A 2001 study of workplace evaluation in a large U.S. company showed that black supervisors rate white subordinates lower than average and vice versa.

Research indicates that unemployment rates are higher for blacks and Latinos than for whites.

==== Housing ====
Multiple experimental audit studies conducted in the United States have found that blacks and Hispanics experience discrimination in about one in five and one in four housing searches, respectively.

A 2014 study also found evidence of racial discrimination in an American rental apartment market.

Researchers found in contrast to White families, families of color were led to obtain housing in poor, low-quality communities due to discrimination during the home-buying process.

Persons affected by homelessness also show a large disparity with more homeless individuals being minorities in the United States.

== Effects on health ==
Studies have shown an association between reported racial discrimination and adverse physical and mental health outcomes. This evidence has come from multiple countries, including the United States, the United Kingdom, and New Zealand.

=== Racism in healthcare system ===
Racial bias exists in the medical field affecting the way patients are treated and the way they are diagnosed. There are instances where patients' words are not taken seriously, an example would be the recent case with Serena Williams. After the birth of her daughter via C-section, the tennis player began to feel pain and shortness of breath. It took her several times to convince the nurse they actually took her self-said symptoms seriously. Had she not been persistent and demanded a CT scan, which showed a clot resulting in blood thinning, Williams might have not been alive. This is just one of hundreds of cases where systemic racism can affect women of color in pregnancy complications.

One of the factors that lead to higher mortality rates amongst black mothers is the poorly conditioned hospitals and lack of standard healthcare facilities. Along with having deliveries done in underdeveloped areas, the situation becomes complicated when the pain dealt by patients are not taken seriously by healthcare providers. Pain heard from patients of color are underestimated by doctors compared to pain told by patients who are white leading them to misdiagnose.

Many say that the education level of people affect whether or not they admit to healthcare facilities, leaning to the argument that people of color purposefully avoid hospitals compared to white counterparts however, this is not the case. Even Serena Williams, a well-known athlete, was not taken seriously when she described her pain. It is true that the experiences of patients in hospital settings influence whether or not they return to healthcare facilities. Black people are less likely to admit to hospitals however those that are admitted have longer stays than white people

The longer hospitalization of black patients does not improve care conditions, it makes it worse, especially when treated poorly by faculty. Not a lot of minorities are admitted into hospitals and those that are receive poor conditioned treatment and care. This discrimination results in misdiagnosis and medical mistakes that lead to high death rates.

Although the Medicaid program was passed to ensure African Americans and other minorities received the healthcare treatment they deserved and to limit discrimination in hospital facilities, there still seems to be an underlying cause for the low number of black patients admitted to hospitals, like not receiving the proper dosage of medication. Infant mortality rates and life expectancies of minorities are much lower than that of white people in the United States. Illnesses like cancer and heart diseases are more prevalent in minorities, which is one of the factors for the high mortality rate in the group. however are not treated accordingly.

Although programs like Medicaid exists to support minorities, there still seems to be a large number of people who are not insured. This financial drawback discourages people in the group to go to hospitals and doctors offices.

Financial and cultural influences can impact the way patients are treated by their healthcare providers. When doctors have a bias on a patient, it can lead to the formation of stereotypes, impacting the way they view their patient's data and diagnosis, affecting the treatment plan they implement.

== Welfare of Children ==
The topic of racial discrimination appears in discussion concerning children, and adolescents. Amongst the number of theories evaluating how children come to understand social identities, research presumes that social and cognitive developmental changes influence children's perspectives regarding their own racial/ethnic identities and children develop a greater understanding of how their race/ethnicity can be perceived by the greater society.

A study led by Benner et al. (2018) analyzes a combination of previous studies indicating an existing relationship between racial discrimination and well-being, more specifically, in regards to mental health, behaviors, and academic performance of adolescents ranging from early adolescence (10–13) to late adolescence (17 and older). While it includes Asian, African descent, and Latino populations, this study also speculates the variances amongst the racial groups and other differences contributed by intersectionality. To investigate these relationships, the researchers examined data containing reports of racial discrimination from children, which served as a significant tool to further explore these ideas. In addition they analyzed the relationship between racial discrimination and aspects of well-being (e.g., self-esteem, substance abuse, student engagement) by organizing these components into broader categories of youth development: mental health, behavioral conditions and academic success. Subsequently, the results show a relationship between racial discrimination and negative outcomes relating to youth wellness across all three categories. Moreover, while examining differences among racial groups, children of Asian and Latino descent were found to be most at risk for mental health development, and Latino children, for academic success.

Racial discrimination affects about 90% of black adolescents, impacting their personal, social, psychological, and academic well-being. It leads to heightened stress, lowered self-esteem, and decreased academic performance. Creating inclusive educational environments with specialized support is crucial for their holistic development amid such challenges.

Although the studies' results correlate reported racial discrimination with outcomes to well-being, this does not conclude that one or more racial groups experience greater discrimination than other racial groups. Other factors may have contributed to the relationships' findings. For example, evidence of a weaker relationship between racial discrimination and well-being in children of African descent may be linked to parent-guided socialization practices to help children cope with racial discrimination, or possibly lack of research concerning the severity of discrimination. Also, researchers speculate the meaningful ways intersectionality can play a role in variances of discrimination. Ultimately, they conclude that further studies to examine racial discrimination are necessary to provide a more comprehensive approach in determining effective support systems for children.

A growing number of studies are researching the differences into the mental health of children of different nationalities and races.

== Critical Consciousness in Youth and Racial Discrimination ==
When a person is conscious of their privilege, mindful of oppression and discrimination, and when they address and counteract these injustices, they are expressing critical consciousness. Additionally, critical consciousness can grow in individuals as a result of inequalities they may face such as racial discrimination.

The researchers, Heberle, Rapa, and Farago (2020), conducted a systematic review of research literature on the concept critical consciousness. The study focused on 67 qualitative and quantitative studies regarding the effects of critical consciousness in youth since 1998. For example, one of the studies included in the report by Ngo (2017), studied an extracurricular program that analyzed the racial discrimination faced by Hmong adolescents and the exploration of critical consciousness participation in theater. The non-scholastic theater program encouraged this group of students to explore their identities through the injustices they faced and to fight against the oppression and racial discrimination they experienced.

Critical consciousness can be used as a tool to fight against racial discrimination. Heberle et al. (2020) argued that a decrease in racial discrimination can happen when White youth are aware of differences in groups and injustices due to their critical consciousness. They might change their thinking by fostering antiracist beliefs and having awareness of their own White privilege.

== Reverse discrimination ==
Reverse discrimination is a term for allegations that the member of a dominant or majority group has suffered discrimination for the benefit of a minority or historically disadvantaged group.

=== United States ===
In the United States, courts have upheld race-conscious policies when they are used to promote a diverse work or educational environment. Some critics have described those policies as discriminating against white people. In response to arguments that such policies (e.g. affirmative action) constitute discrimination against whites, sociologists note that the purpose of these policies is to level the playing field to counteract discrimination.

==== Perceptions ====
A 2016 poll found that 38% of US citizens thought that Whites faced a lot of discrimination. Among Democrats, 29% thought there was some discrimination against Whites in the United States, while 49% of Republicans thought the same. Similarly, another poll conducted earlier in the year found that 41% of US citizens believed there was "widespread" discrimination against whites. There is evidence that some people are motivated to believe they are the victims of reverse discrimination because the belief bolsters their self-esteem.

==== Law ====
In the United States, Title VII of the Civil Rights Act of 1964 prohibits all racial discrimination based on race. Although some courts have taken the position that a white person must meet a heightened standard of proof to prove a reverse-discrimination claim, the U.S. Equal Employment Opportunity Commission (EEOC) applies the same standard to all claims of racial discrimination without regard to the victim's race.

== See also ==
- Anti-racism
- Discrimination based on skin color
- Employment discrimination
- Ethnic cleansing
- Ethnic conflict
- Ethnic group
- Ethnic violence
- Ethnocentrism
- Eugenics
- Genocide
- Hate crime
- Hate group
- Hate media
- Hate speech
- Hate studies
- Historical race concepts
- Index of racism-related articles
- International Day for the Elimination of Racial Discrimination
- Nativism
- Psychological impact of discrimination on health
- Race (human categorization)
- Racial equality
- Racial hierarchy
- Racial hygiene
- Racial inequality
- Racial segregation
- Racial integration
- Racism
- Racism on the Internet
- Supremacism#Racial
- Taste-based discrimination
- Statistical discrimination (economics)
- Xenophobia
