= Marianne Bertrand =

Belgian economist

- Born: c. 1970 (age 55–56); Belgium

Academic background
- Education: Université libre de Bruxelles (BA, MSc); Harvard University (PhD)
- Doctoral advisor: Lawrence F. Katz

Academic work
- Discipline: Social economics
- Institutions: Princeton University; University of Chicago Brussels University
- Awards: Sherwin Rosen Award for Outstanding Contributions to Labor Economics(2012); Elaine Bennett Research Prize (2004); Fellow of the American Academy of Arts and Sciences
- Website: Information at IDEAS / RePEc

Marianne Bertrand (born c. 1970) is a Belgian economist who currently works as Chris P. Dialynas Distinguished Service Professor of Economics and Willard Graham Faculty Scholar at the University of Chicago's Booth School of Business. Bertrand belongs to the world's most prominent labour economists in terms of research, and has been awarded the 2004 Elaine Bennett Research Prize and the 2012 Sherwin Rosen Prize for Outstanding Contributions in the Field of Labor Economics. She is a research fellow of the National Bureau of Economic Research, and the IZA Institute of Labor Economics.

== Early life and education ==
Bertrand earned a B.A. in economics and a M.Sc. in econometrics from the Free University of Brussels in 1991 and 1992. Thereafter, she did a Ph.D. in economics at Harvard University.

== Career ==
After her graduation in 1998, Bertrand became an assistant professor of economics and public affairs at Princeton University's Woodrow Wilson School of Public and International Affairs but left for the University of Chicago's Booth School of Business in 2000. There, she was promoted to full professor in 2003, followed by the positions of Fred G. Steingraber/A. T. Kearney Professor of Economics and Chris. P. Dialynas Professor Economics. In addition to her academic position, Bertrand maintains affiliations with the Abdul Latif Jameel Poverty Action Lab, where she is a member of the Board of Directors and currently co-chairs J-PAL's Labor Markets sector, the Russell Sage Foundation, IZA, NBER, and CEPR. At Chicago, she is involved as Faculty Director in the Inclusive Economy Lab of the university's Urban Labs as well as the Booth Rustandy Center for Social Sector Innovation, Booth's social impact hub. She also has performed editorial duties for the American Economic Review, Quarterly Journal of Economics, American Economic Journal: Applied Economics, Economic Journal, and the Journal of the European Economic Association.

== Research ==
Bertrand's research interests include econometric methodology, labour economics, corporate governance and development economics. Her most-cited article is her 2004 article with Esther Duflo and Sendil Mullainathan, "How Much Should We Trust Differences-In-Differences Estimates?" In most of her research she uses economic experiments, often in collaboration with her frequent co-author Sendhil Mullainathan. According to IDEAS/RePEc, Bertrand ranked in September 2018 157th in terms of research among 54,233 registered economists (i.e., among the top 0.3%) and 5th among 10,406 female economists (among the top 0.05%) As of August 2024 her rank increased to 83rd overall.

=== Research on labour economics, discrimination and gender gaps ===
One key area of Bertrand's research is labour economics, in particular racial and gender discrimination. Together with Sendhil Mullainathan, she finds that the introduction of antitakeover legislation, which shield companies somewhat from competition, in the 1980s raised wages by 1–2%, thus suggesting that managers have some discretion in wage setting. In a seminal contribution to research on racial labour market discrimination, Bertrand and Mullainathan manipulate perceived race on fictitious resumes sent in reply to help-wanted ads by using Afro-American- or Caucasian-sounding names and observe that "white names" receive 50% more callbacks for interviews, a finding that holds robustly across occupations, industries, firm sizes and controls for social class. Relatedly, Bertrand, Mullainathan and Dolly Chugh have argued for the existence of implicit discrimination, which – unlike taste-based or statistical discrimination – is unintentional and of which the discriminator is unaware. In another exploration of racial discrimination, Bertrand, Mullainathan and David Abrams find that judges in Illinois vary in the degree to which race influences their sentencing, with smaller gaps between white and Afro-American incarceration rates for Afro-American judges and judges passing comparatively many incarceration sentences also being disproportionately likely to sentence Afro-Americans to jail.

Studying the impact of entry regulation on job creation in France with Francis Kramarz, Bertrand finds that regional zoning boards' tendency to deter the creation or extension of retail stores increased retailer concentration and slowed down employment growth. In another study of the impact of infra-industry competition on wages, Bertrand finds that growth in import competition makes workers' wages more sensitive to the current unemployment rate and less sensitive to the unemployment rate that prevailed at the time they were hired, thus suggesting that import competition may erode the implicit contracts between employers and their employees.

Analysing the gender gap with Kevin Hallock, Bertrand observes that from 1992 to 1997 only 2.5% of top executives in US firms were women and that they earned on average 45% less than men, with up to 75% of that gap being explained by differences in the size of the managed firms and women's lower likelihood to be CEO, chair or president, though she also finds that female participation in top executive positions nearly tripled during that period; nonetheless, Bertrand and Hallock stress that gender discrimination via segregation or unequal promotion cannot be ruled out. Further exploring the issue of gender pay gaps with Claudia Goldin and Lawrence F. Katz, Bertrand finds that although the earnings of male and female MBAs are nearly identical at the beginning of their careers, ten years later, male earnings are almost 60 log points higher, with most of the gap being explained by differences in pre-MBA training, career interruptions and weekly hours, the latter two being mostly due to motherhood. Another major contribution to the role of gender in the labour market is Bertrand's 2011 chapter in the Handbook of Labor Economics, which reviews the potential of psychological and socio-psychological factors in explaining gender differences in labour market outcomes. More recently, in research with Emir Kamenica and Jessica Pan, Bertrand has found that the distribution of wives' share of household income drops sharply just after 50%, which she attributes to gender norms averse to the husband earning less than his wife, a norm that in turn affects the formation of marriages, wives' labour force participation and their income conditional on working, marriage satisfaction, divorce rates, and the division of household chores. Relatedly, Bertrand and Pan have also explored the gender gap in disruptive behaviour, finding that boys' propensity to disruptive behaviour – unlike girls' – seems to be extremely responsive to parental inputs, which are substantially worse in broken families, whereas early school environment has little impact.

Another interesting research pertaining to gender gap is about effect of board quotas on female labor force in Norway. She found that after Norway passed the law to have at least 40% women representation in board meetings, there were no significant impacts to the broader female population in the country. They found that this bill benefited young female business graduates the most. The overall conclusion after seven years was that this law had minimum impact on the larger society of women, except for those who were actually on the board.

=== Research on corporate governance, family firms and finance ===
Another major area of Bertrand's research is corporate governance. Together with Mullainathan, Bertrand has researched the determinants of CEO pay, contrasting the contracting view – shareholders set CEO contracts in such a way as to limit moral hazard – with the skimming view – CEOs set their own pay by manipulation the compensation committee to skim as much as possible. In line with the skimming view, they find that CEO pay responds just as much to luck – shocks to the firm performance that are objectively beyond their control – as to developments over which they have control, with the sensitivity to luck being generally higher in firms with poor corporate governance. Moreover, Bertrand and Mullainathan find that the more managers' firms are sheltered from competition, e.g. antitakeover laws, the more wages rise and productivity and profitability fall, possibly due to decreases in the destruction of old and the creation of new plants, suggesting that managers may prefer stability to empire building. Together with Antoinette Schoar, Bertrand has investigated the effect of managers on firm policies in the U.S., finding that a large share of differences between firms' investment, financial, and organizational practices are due to differences in their managers and, more importantly, their management style, with older managers generally being more conservative and managers with MBA degrees being generally more aggressive in terms of corporate decisions. In work with Schoar and David Thesmar, Bertrand observes that after the deregulation of banking in France in 1985, banks became less willing to bail out firms with poor performance and firms being more dependent on banks became more likely to restructure, with rising rates of job and asset reallocation, higher allocative efficiency, and a less concentrated banking sector, an observation in line with Schumpeterian processes of creative destruction. Finally, together with Adair Morse, Bertrand succeeds in decreasing the take-up of highly costly payday loans by 11% over a four-month period by making borrowers think about the dollar fees accruing due to the loans' roll-over, suggesting a role for information disclosure policies to remedy payday borrowing.

Bertrand and Schoar have also conducted research on the role of family for family enterprises, finding that family values tend to be associated with lower economic development – though differently than trust – and more family firms are fairly stable over time, do not react much to economic changes, and do not appear to reflect weak formal institutions. In further research on this topic in Thailand with Simon Johnson and Krislert Samphantharak, Bertrand and Schoar find family involvement in the ownership of family businesses to increase in family size, though firm performance decreases the more the founders' sons become involved, possibly because of a "race to the bottom", wherein fearing the dilution of ownership and control over the business group, the descendants attempt to tunnel resources out of the group's firms. These results are matched by Bertrand and Mullainathan's earlier research on business groups in India, which also finds significant amounts of tunneling, especially via nonoperating components of profit.

=== Research on development economics ===
A third area of Bertrand's research concerns development economics. One of Bertrand's most important contributions to this area is the development (together with Mullainathan and Eldar Shafir) of a view on poverty that emphasizes neither the role of a culture of poverty or of significant differences between the psychology and attitudes of poor and rich people, but rather highlights that the economic consequences of common biases are disproportionately large for poor people precisely because they are poor and thus have little margin for error. They thus argue for the use of insights from behavioural economics and marketing to help poor people make decisions, e.g. by making participation in programs aimed at the poor simple and by investing into the marketing of these programs to increase their outreach. With Mullainathan and Douglas Miller, Bertrand has also studied the allocation of resources within extended families in the wake of South Africa's pension program, finding the labour supply of prime-age individuals to drop sharply when elderly household members become eligible for pensions, with the drop being larger if the pensioner is a woman, if the non-pensioners are themselves old, and if they are male, the drop being largest for the oldest son than for any other prime-age household member. In India, Bertrand, Mullainathan, Simeon Djankov and Rema Hanna study corruption using the allocation of driver's licenses and find that the illegal obtention of licenses is mostly performed by using private intermediaries to give bribes so that they may not have to pass the driving test. Finally, more recently, Bertrand has been involved in the evaluation of conditional cash transfer programs, e.g. finding that the postponement of transfers to parents until re-enrollment and the incentivization of graduation and tertiary enrollment both increase enrollment rates at the secondary and tertiary level. Another interesting research she did in the field of development economics was the marketing in aid of decision making to the poor. In this paper she studies the aspects of economic decision making on the life of the poor, and how it is influenced by effective marketing.

=== Other research ===
Other topics of Bertrand's research include econometric methodology, welfare cultures, advertising, lobbyism, and trickle-down consumption:

- Because of the correlation between measurement errors of subjective data and many personal characteristics and behaviours, subjective data do not make good dependent variables, though they can be useful as explanatory variables (with Mullainathan).
- The standard errors of research applying difference in differences estimation to time-series or panel data with serially correlated outcomes are likely to understate the real standard errors if such autocorrelation is not accounted for (with Mullainathan and Esther Duflo).
- Being surrounded by others who speak the same language increases welfare participation more for those from high welfare-using language groups (with Erzo Luttmer and Mullainathan).
- Advertising through the inclusion of a photo of an attractive woman increases demand for consumer loans, decreasing the number of example loans, or not suggesting particular uses for a loan increases loan demand by as much as a 25% reduction in the credit rate, as do longer deadlines for loan applications (with Mullainathan, Shafir, Dean Karlan and Jonathan Zinman).
- Evidence on lobbyism in the US does not support the expertise view, wherein lobbyism provides issue-specific expertise to politicians, as the sole explanation for lobbyism and instead suggests that lobbyists focus on developing a "circle of influence" within which they represent the special interests of their clients (with Matilde Bombardini and Francesco Trebbi).
- Especially for visible goods and services, the share of non-rich households' incomes spent on consumption increases in their exposure to higher top income and consumption, suggesting a role for conspicuous consumption with regard to inequality (with Adair Morse).
- The cost of political connections (joint with Francis Kramarz and David Thesmar)
- What do high interest borrowers do with their tax rebates?

== Other activities ==
- Barcelona School of Economics, Member of the Scientific Council (since 2022)

== Awards, honors and grants ==
- Jan Söderberg Family Prize in Economics and Management
- Elaine Bennett Research Prize
- Brattle Group Prize
- Fellowship of the American Academy of Arts and Sciences
- Fellowship of the Econometric Society
- John T. Dunlop Outstanding Scholar Award
- Doctor Honoris Cause, University of Geneva, 2016.
- Doctor Honoris Causa, Universite Libre de Bruxelles, 2016.
- National Bureau of Economic Research Grant for Research on non-Profit Institutions, 1999.
- Citigroup Behavioral Sciences Research Grant, 1997–1998
- American Compensation Association (A.C.A) Research Grant, 1996.
- Barry Prize for Distinguished Intellectual Achievement from the American Academy of Sciences and Letters, 2024.

== Selected bibliography ==
- Bertrand, Marianne; Mullainathan, Sendhil (May 2000). "Agents with and without principals". American Economic Review. 90 (2): 203–208. doi:10.1257/aer.90.2.203.
- Bertrand, Marianne; Mullainathan, Sendhil (2001). "Are CEOs rewarded for luck? The ones without principals are". The Quarterly Journal of Economics. 116 (3): 901–932. doi:10.1162/00335530152466269.
- Bertrand, Marianne; Duflo, Esther; Mullainathan, Sendhil (2004). "How Much Should We Trust Differences-In-Differences Estimates?" (PDF). Quarterly Journal of Economics. 119 (1): 249–275. doi:10.1162/003355304772839588. hdl:1721.1/63690. S2CID 470667.
- Bertrand, Marianne; Mullainathan, Sendhil (September 2004). "Are Emily and Greg more employable than Lakisha and Jamal? A field experiment on labor market discrimination". American Economic Review. 94 (4): 991–1013. doi:10.1257/0002828042002561. hdl:1721.1/63261.
- Bertrand, Marianne; Johnson, Simon; Samphantharak, Krislert; Schoar, Antoinette (21 March 2005). "Mixing family with business: a study of Thai business groups and the families behind them". Social Science Research Network: 466–498. doi:10.2139/ssrn.687299. S2CID 14064167.
- Bertrand, Marianne; Mullainathan, Sendhil; Djankov, Simeon; Hanna, Rema (2007). "Obtaining a driver's license in India: an experimental approach to studying corruption". The Quarterly Journal of Economics. 122 (4): 1639–1676. doi:10.1162/qjec.2007.122.4.1639.
- Bertrand, Marianne; Mullainathan, Sendhil; Shafir, Eldar; Karlan, Dean; Zinman, Jonathan (2010). "What's advertising content worth? Evidence from a consumer credit marketing field experiment" (PDF). The Quarterly Journal of Economics. 125 (1): 263–306. doi:10.1162/qjec.2010.125.1.263. hdl:10419/27007. S2CID 3231264.
- Bertrand, Marianne; Morse, Adair (December 2011). "Information disclosure, cognitive biases, and payday borrowing". The Journal of Finance. 66 (6): 1865–1893. doi:10.1111/j.1540-6261.2011.01698.x.
