= Loury =

Loury may refer to:

== People ==
- Glenn Loury (born 1948), American economist
- Jeanne Loury (1876–1951), French actress
- Linda Datcher Loury (1952–2011), American economist
- Pierre Loury, American teen killed by Chicago police in 2016

== Places ==
- Loury, Loiret, France
