= Sherry Wu =

Chinese psychologist

Sherry J. Wu
- Born: Suzhou, China
- Other name: Sherry Wu
- Occupation: Psychologist

Academic background
- Education: Princeton University
- Alma mater: University of Virginia
- Academic advisors: Betsy Levy Paluck; Eldar Shafir

Academic work
- Discipline: Psychologist
- Sub-discipline: Group dynamics
- Institutions: University of California, Los Angeles

Sherry Jueyu Wu is an Assistant Professor of Management and Organizational Behavior at the University of California, Los Angeles (UCLA) Anderson School of Management. in Westwood, California and the 2020 recipient of the Cialdini Prize from the Society for Personality and Social Psychology (SPSP) for her field research in group dynamics and authority. She conducts large-scale field experiments concerning group influence over long-lasting behavioral changes and decision processes under resource disparity and social inequality.

== Education and career ==
Wu received her Bachelor of Arts degrees in Psychology and Economics graduating summa cum laude from the University of Virginia in May 2013. She then went on to Graduate Studies in Social Psychology and Social Policy at Princeton University under the mentorship of Betsy Levy Paluck and Eldar Shafir, earning her Ph.D. in June 2019. Currently, Wu has been an Assistant Professor at the UCLA Anderson School of Management since July 2019, instructing primarily MBA students in Leadership Foundations and Organizational Behavior Management.

== Personal ==
Wu is originally from Suzhou, China and graduated from the Jiangsu four-starred Suzhou High School. She is currently residing in Sherman Oaks, Los Angeles.

Wu is fluent in Mandarin Chinese, Wu Chinese, and English.
