= Statistical discrimination =

Statistical discrimination may refer to:

- Statistical discrimination (economics)
- Linear discriminant analysis (statistics)
