= Zinman =

Zinman is a surname. Notable people with the surname include:

- David Zinman (born 1936), American conductor and violinist
- John Zinman, American film and television writer and producer
- Jonathan Zinman (born c. 1971), professor
- Stella Zinman

== See also ==
- Zinman Furs, an American fur coat company
