= Debraj Ray =

Debraj Ray may refer to:

- Debraj Ray (economist) (born 1957), Indian-American economist
- Debraj Ray (actor) (born 1954), Indian actor
