= Datcher =

Datcher is a surname. Notable people with the surname include:

- Jane Eleanor Datcher (1868–1934), American botanist
- Kelvin Datcher, American politician
- Linda Datcher Loury (1952–2011), American economist

== See also ==
- Datchet
