= Love Leadership: The New Way to Lead in a Fear-Based World =

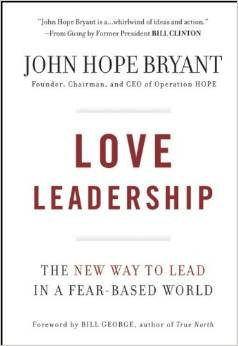
- Author: John Hope Bryant
- Language: English
- Published: August 17, 2009 (Jossey-Bass)
- Publication place: United States
- Media type: Hardcover
- Pages: 224
- ISBN: 978-0-470-42878-8

Love Leadership: The New Way to Lead in a Fear-Based World is an educational book by John Hope Bryant, published in August 2009.

== See also ==
- Operation HOPE, Inc.
- How the Poor Can Save Capitalism
