= John Hope Bryant =

American financial literacy entrepreneur and businessman (born 1966)

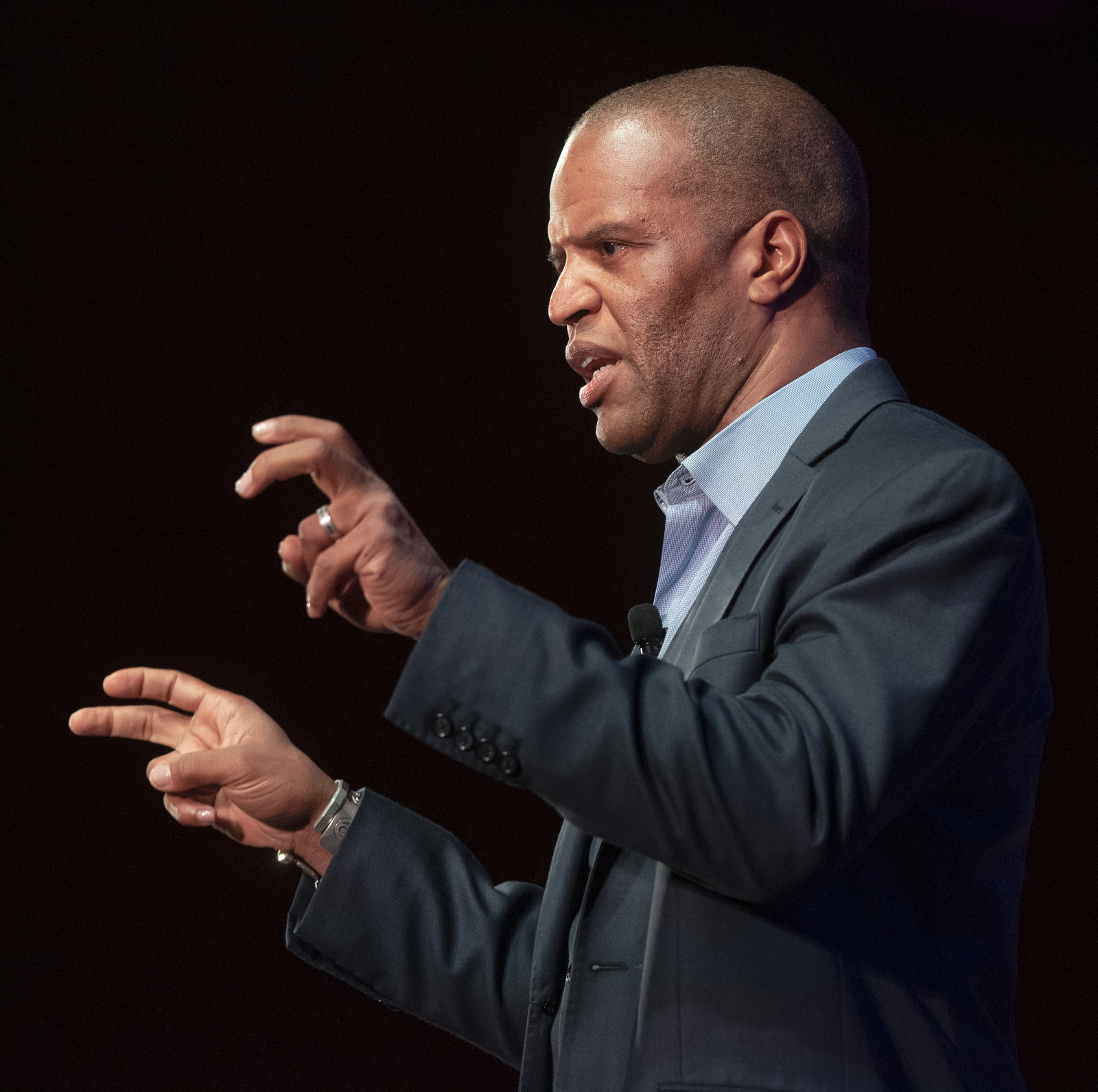
- Bryant in 2019
- Born: February 6, 1966 (age 60); Los Angeles, California
- Education: Santa Monica High School
- Occupations: Entrepreneur, businessman
- Spouse: Chaitra Dalton Bryant (2025) Sheila Jenine Kennedy-Bryant (2008)

John Hope Bryant (born February 6, 1966) is an American financial literacy entrepreneur and businessman. Bryant is the founder, chairman and chief executive officer of nonprofit Operation HOPE. He served as vice-chair of President Bush's Council on Financial Literacy, a member of President Obama's Advisory Council on Financial Capability, the vice chair on the U.S. President's Advisory Council on Financial Literacy and as the chairman of the Committee on the Underserved.

== Early life ==
Bryant was born on February 6, 1966, in Los Angeles, California, to Johnnie Will Smith and Juanita Smith, He was born John Bryant Smith. Bryant was raised primarily in Compton, and in the South Central area of Los Angeles.

At age 15 attended the Hollywood Professional School. He graduated from Santa Monica High School in 1984.

== Career ==
Bryant has organized and led over 15 bankers bus tours since HOPE's inception in 1992, including the cities of Los Angeles, Maywood and Oakland, California, Anacostia, D.C. and Atlanta, Georgia, with the purpose of encouraging financial investment in low-to-mod communities.

On June 13, 2004, U.S. President George W. Bush appointed Bryant to a four-year term on the non-partisan U.S. Community Development Advisory Board for the Community Development Financial Institutions Fund (CDFI Fund), at the U.S. Department of the Treasury.

On January 22, 2008, Bryant was appointed vice-chairman of the president's Council on Financial Literacy by U.S. President George W. Bush. He continued this work under President Barack Obama as part of the U.S. President's Advisory Council on Financial Capability (PACFC).

In September 2008, he was selected to be a member of the Global Agenda Council for the World Economic Forum in Geneva.

On January 29, 2010, he became a part of President Barack Obama's Advisory Council on Financial Capability.

== Personal ==
Bryant is married to Chaitra Dalton Bryant,. Bryant was previously married to Sheila Jenine Kennedy-Bryant.

== Honors and awards ==
- 1994: selected by Time magazine as "One of America's 50 Most Promising Leaders of the Future," as part of their 50 for the Future cover story.
- 2005: Crystal Heart Award from the University of Southern California School of Social Work for his work in community service.
- 2010: Latvian President Valdis Zatlers received Bryant on behalf of the Republic of Latvia as the second speaker for the Latvia Presidential Speaker Series at Latvia University, on the topic of "The Economic Reset, Love Leadership in a fear-based world, and financial literacy as a new civil right."
- 2010: Newsmax magazine named him for his work at Operation HOPE, as one of their 2010 Heroes.
- 2011: Operation HOPE and Bryant received the Marcus Garvey Bridge Builder in the Diaspora Award during the 16th Annual Caribbean Multi-National Business Conference in Jamaica.
- 2016: Innovator of the Year by American Banker magazine
- Member, Phi Beta Sigma fraternity
- 2025: Honoree at Black Enterprise XCEL Summit for Men
- 2026: Forbes 250 Greatest Self-Made Americans, No. 145
- Oprah Winfrey's Use Your Life Award
- TIME's 50 Leaders for the Future

== Bibliography ==
- Capitalism for All: Inclusive Economics and the Future-Proofing of America, Bryant, John Hope, Wiley (publisher), 2026, ISBN 978-1-394-40910-5
- Financial Literacy for All: Disrupting Struggle, Advancing Financial Freedom, and Building a New American Middle Class, Bryant, John Hope, Wiley (publisher), 2024, ISBN 978-1-394-20902-6
- Five Rules for Your Economic Liberation, Bryant, John Hope Berrett-Koehler Publishers, 2017, ISBN 978-1-523-08456-2
- How the Poor Can Save Capitalism Bryant, John Hope Berrett-Koehler Publishers, 2014, ISBN 978-1-626-56032-1
- Love Leadership:The New Way To Lead In A Fear-Based World Bryant, John Hope Jossey-Bass, 2009, ISBN 0-470-42878-3, ISBN 978-0-470-42878-8
- Actions Speak Loudest: Keeping Our Promise For A Better World McKinnon, Robert, Williams, Juan The Lyon Press, 2009, ISBN 978-1-59921-486-3, ISBN 1-59921-486-5
- Banking on our Future: a Program for Teaching You and your Kids about Money by Bryant, Beacon Press, 2002, ISBN 978-0-8070-4717-0
- Fixing the Jericho Road: The Silver Rights Movement and the Good Samaritan
- Silver Rights Movement in Africa
- The Ownership Society
- Racism and the Silver Rights Movement
- Banking on Our Future: The Promise for America's Unbanked
- The Silver Rights Movement
