= Coate–Loury model =

Model of affirmative action

The Coate–Loury model of affirmative action was developed by Stephen Coate and Glenn Loury in 1993. The model seeks to answer the question of whether, by mandating expanded opportunities for minorities in the present, these policies are rendered unnecessary in the future. Affirmative action may lead to one of two outcomes:

1. By improving employers’ perceptions of minorities or improving minorities’ skills, or both, affirmative action policies would eventually cause employers to want to hire minorities regardless of the presence of affirmative action policies.
2. By dampening incentives for minorities, affirmative action policies would reduce minority skill investment, thus leading to an equilibrium where employers correctly believe minorities to be less productive than majorities, thus perpetuating the need for affirmative action in order to achieve parity in the labor market.

Coate and Loury concluded that either equilibrium is possible under certain assumptions.

== Model framework ==
The exposition of the Coate–Loury model follows the notes of David Autor. The authors make three assumptions as a starting point for their model:

1. The underlying skill distributions of minorities and non-minorities are the same. This skill distribution is modeled as a distribution of costs of obtaining a qualification.
2. Employers cannot observe qualifications but do observe noisy signals that are correlated with it.
3. Employers have rational expectations about worker qualifications and workers have rational expectations about employer screening. Thus, in equilibrium, employers beliefs about worker qualifications will be confirmed. And, similarly, workers will make investments consistent with the returns they will receive in the labor market for those investments.

Employers are able to observe worker's identity $\mathcal{I} \in \{ B,W \}$, where the fraction of the population that is $W$ is $\lambda$, and a noisy signal of the worker's qualification level $\theta \in [0,1]$. Employers can assign workers to either Task 0 or Task 1, with only qualified workers being successful at Task 1. Employers get a net return $x$ from assigning a worker to Task 1 of the form:
$$x = \begin{cases} x_{q} > 0, \quad &(\text{Worker Qualified}) \\ -x_{u} <0, \quad &(\text{Worker Unqualified}) \end{cases}$$
The ratio of net gain to loss $r = x_{q}/x_{u}$.

The distribution of $\theta$ depends on whether or not the worker is qualified, which is assumed to not differ between $B$ and $W$. Let $F_{q}(\theta)$ be the probability that the signal does not exceed $\theta$, given that the worker is qualified; $F_{u}(\theta)$ is the probability that the signal does not exceed $\theta$, given that the worker is unqualified. The corresponding probability density functions are $f_{q}(\theta)$ and $f_{u}(\theta)$. Let $\varphi(\theta) = f_{u}(\theta)/f_{q}(\theta)$ be the likelihood ratio, and assume that it is non-increasing on $\theta \in [0,1]$. This implies that:
$$F_{q}(\theta) \leq F_{u}(\theta), \quad \forall \theta \in [0,1]$$
Therefore, higher values of the signal are more likely if the worker is qualified. This implies that $\varphi(\theta)$ has the monotone likelihood ratio (MLR) property.

=== Employers' decision rule ===
For a worker from group $B$ or $W$, the fraction of qualified workers in the group is $\pi$. Using Bayes' rule, the employer's posterior probability that the worker is qualified, given the worker's signal, is:
$$\begin{aligned}
\xi(\pi,\theta) &= {\pi f_{q}(\theta)\over{\pi f_{q}(\theta) + (1 - \pi )f_{u}(\theta)}} \\
&= {1\over{1 + {1-\pi\over{\pi}} \varphi(\theta) }}
\end{aligned}$$

The expected benefit of assigning a worker to Task 1 is:
$$\xi(\pi,\theta)x_{q} - \left[1 - \xi(\pi,\theta) \right]x_{u}$$
Then the employer will assign a worker to Task 1 if the return is positive, which implies that:
$$\begin{aligned}
r &\geq {1-\xi(\pi,\theta)\over{\xi(\pi,\theta)}} \\
&\geq \left({1-\pi\over{\pi}}\right)\varphi(\theta)
\end{aligned}$$
Based on the MLR assumption, there exists a threshold standard $s^{*}(\pi)$ that depends on group membership, so that workers with $\theta > s^{*}$ are placed in Task 1:
$$s^{*}(\pi) = \min \{ \theta \in [0,1], \quad r\geq [(1-\pi)/\pi]\varphi(\theta) \}$$
This implies that a higher qualification rate of a group will lead to a lower threshold hiring standard $s^{*}$.

=== Workers' investment decision ===
The expected gross benefit to obtaining appropriate qualification for a worker is:
$$\begin{aligned}
\beta(s) &= \omega\left\{[1-F_{q}(s)] - [1-F_{u}(s)] \right\} \\
&= \omega [F_{u}(s)-F_{q}(s)]
\end{aligned}$$
where $\omega$ is gross benefit of being assigned to Task 1 and $s$ is the passing standard. Given the assumption that employers have rational expectations, only the true probability that a worker is qualified should matter - not the employer's beliefs about the probability.

Note that $\beta(s)$ is a single-peaked function with $\beta(0) = \beta(1) = 0$, since there would be no point to investing if all workers were assigned to Task 1 or no workers were assigned to Task 1. This implies that the gross benefit to investing will rise so long as the marginal probability of being assigned to Task 1 is increasing in $s$. To see this, note that the derivative of the gross benefit with respect to $s$ is:
$${\partial\beta\over{\partial s}} = \omega[f_{u}(s)-f_{q}(s)]$$
This is only positive if $\varphi(s) > 1$. Since the boundary points are equal to zero, it follows that $\varphi(s)$ must sometimes be above 1 and sometimes below 1 in the interval.

Workers will invest if $\beta(s) \geq c$, so the share of workers investing will be $G[\beta(s)]$. If $G(\cdot)$ is continuous and $G(0)=0$, it will have the property that when the gross benefit is rising in $s$, the net benefit should also be rising.

=== Equilibrium ===
An equilibrium is a fixed point of the aforementioned hiring and investment policies where beliefs are self-confirming, such that:
$$\pi_{i} = G\{ \beta[s^{*}(\pi_{i})] \}, \quad i \in \{B,W\}$$
A discriminatory equilibrium $(\pi_{B} < \pi_{W})$ can occur whenever the equilibrium equation has multiple solutions. In this case, it is possible that employers will believe that members of $B$ are less qualified than members of $W$, which will be confirmed by the investment behavior of members of $B$.

Proposition 1 (p. 1226) proves that, under reasonable conditions, if a solution exists to the equilibrium condition, then at least two solutions will exist. At this point, there are several observations that can be made:

1. Group identity conveys information only because employers expect it to.
2. Stereotypes are inefficient sources of information.
3. No single employer could break the discriminatory equilibrium.
4. The employer's expected benefit from hiring a $W$ worker exceeds that of hiring a $B$ worker.

=== Affirmative action ===
Under the assumption that a discriminatory equilibrium exists, with the further assumption of no differences in skill distributions, an affirmative action policy can be easily rationalized. Coate and Loury consider the policy where the rate of assignment for $B$ and $W$ workers to Task 1 is equalized. Let $\lambda$ be the proportion of $W$ in the population.

Let $\rho(s,\pi)$ be the ex ante probability that a worker is assigned to Task 1:
$$\rho(s,\pi) = \pi[1-F_{q}(s)] + (1-\pi)[1-F_{u}(s)]$$
And let $P(s,\pi)$ be the expected payoff from hiring this worker:
$$P(s,\pi) = \pi[1-F_{q}(s)]x_{q} - (1-\pi)[1-F_{u}(s)]x_{u}$$
Under affirmative action, the employers' optimization problem is to solve:
$$\max_{s_{w},s_{b}} \; (1-\lambda)P(s_{b},\pi_{b}) + \lambda P(s_{w},\pi_{w}), \quad \text{s.t.} \; \rho(s_{b},\pi_{b}) = \rho(s_{w},\pi_{w})$$
where the equality constraint on the ex ante probabilities is the affirmative action constraint. The equivalent Lagrangian $\mathcal{L}$ is:
$$\mathcal{L}(s_{b},s_{w},\gamma;\pi_{b},\pi_{w}) = (1-\lambda)P(s_{b},\pi_{b}) + \lambda P(s_{w},\pi_{w}) + \gamma \left[ \rho(s_{b},\pi_{b}) - \rho(s_{w},\pi_{w})\right]$$
where $\gamma$ is the Lagrange multiplier. Proposition 2 (p. 1229) develops a condition for the existence of a nondiscriminatory equilibrium under affirmative action. In particular, if any group of workers facing standard $s$ invest so that the fraction $G[\beta(s)]$ is qualified, then all equilibria are self-confirming:
$$\widehat{\rho}(s) = \rho\left\{s,G[\beta(s)]\right\}$$
In this case, the affirmative action policy would equate employers' beliefs about members of each group.

=== Patronizing equilibrium ===
However, it is not in general true that affirmative action under the model's assumptions leads to the nondiscriminatory equilibrium. If at $s_{w}$ the employer lowered the threshold $s' < s_{w}$, then the fraction of workers investing would fall, and the employers' beliefs about the fraction who are qualified would not be satisfied. Therefore, a policy that lowered $s_{w}$ would not be self-enforcing.

Coate and Loury define an equilibrium where affirmative action constraint is permanently binding as a patronizing equilibrium, where employers are compelled to lower their hiring standards for members of $B$, relative to a member of $W$. Therefore, the following conditions hold in a patronizing equilibrium:
$$s_{b}^{*} < s_{w}^{*}, \quad \pi_{b} < \pi_{w}$$
There are several possible negative effects on members of $B$ from being trapped in a patronizing equilibrium:

- Due to a lower standard, members of $B$ find it optimal to invest less in skills acquisition, which then confirms employers' negative views
- Despite being initially identical, reduced investment leads to a divergence between groups and the development of a negative stereotype

Recalling the Lagrangian that was developed earlier, we may consider the first-order optimality conditions. Computing $\partial\mathcal{L}/\partial s_{i}$ and rearranging terms gives us:
$$\begin{aligned}
r_{b}(\gamma) &= {1-\pi_{b}\over{\pi_{b}}}\varphi(s_{b}) \\
r_{w}(\gamma) &= {1-\pi_{w}\over{\pi_{w}}}\varphi(s_{w})
\end{aligned}$$
where the ratios of net gain to loss for each group are:
$$r_{b}(\gamma) = {x_{q} + \gamma/(1-\lambda)\over{x_{u}-\gamma/(1-\lambda)}}, \quad r_{w}(\gamma) = {x_{q} + \gamma/\lambda\over{x_{u}-\gamma/\lambda}}$$
Given a shadow price of equality $\gamma$, employers act as if they must pay the tax of $\gamma/\lambda$ for each $W$ assigned to Task 1 instead of Task 0, while receiving the subsidy $\gamma/(1-\lambda)$ for each $B$ put into Task 1 rather than Task 0. Therefore, employers generally respond to the affirmative action constraint by lowering the standard for $B$ and raising it for $W$.

Proposition 4 (p. 1234) shows that, under reasonable assumptions, the marginal productivity of $B$ and $W$ hires is not equated.

== See also ==
- Labour economics
- Law and economics
- Mathematical economics
- Statistical discrimination (economics)
