= Jessica Pan =

Singaporean economist

- Born: Singapore
- Education: University of Chicago (BA); University of Chicago Booth School of Business (MBA, PhD)
- Awards: Fellow of the Econometric Society
- Scientific career
- Fields: Labor economics
- Workplaces: National University of Singapore
- Thesis: Essays in empirical labor economics (2010)
- Doctoral advisor: David Autor; Marianne Bertrand; Patricia Cortés; Kerwin Charles; Jonathan Guryan
- Website: https://sites.google.com/site/jessicapan13/

Jessica Pan is a Singaporean economist currently serving as professor of economics at the National University of Singapore. Her research focuses on applied topics in labor economics, especially related to gender, migration, discrimination, and the returns of education. In 2020, she was elected a Fellow of the Econometric Society.

== Early life and education ==
Pan was born in Singapore, daughter of Jennifer W. Phang, a university administrator, and Jacob Phang, a professor of electrical and computer engineering, both of the National University of Singapore. She received a BA in economics from the University of Chicago in 2005, followed by an MBA and PhD from the University of Chicago Booth School of Business in 2010. Her thesis examined the role of women in labor markets in the United States and Hong Kong, and was supervised by David Autor, Marianne Bertrand, Kerwin Charles, Patricia Cortés, and Jonathan Guryan.

== Academic career ==
After completing her PhD, Pan joined the National University of Singapore as an assistant professor, where she is currently a professor of economics, Dean of the Graduate School, and Vice Provost for Graduate Education.

In addition to her academic appointments, Pan is affiliated with the Centre for Economic Policy Research and IZA Institute of Labor Economics. She is also a co-editor of the Journal of Public Economics.

In 2020, she was elected a fellow of the Econometric Society.

=== Research ===
Pan's research examines labor markets, particularly as they relate to gender, discrimination, and migration. She has also pursued research on the returns to education and training.

==== Gender and discrimination ====
Much of Pan's work focuses on the role of sexism and other forms of discrimination on labor market outcomes. In work with Emir Kamenica and Marianne Bertrand in The Quarterly Journal of Economics, Pan shows that there are few marriages in which women earn more than their husbands, with divorce rates increasing when women begin to earn more. She also shows that when women earn more, they are more likely to take up household chores, even though their opportunity cost of doing so is higher.

In work in The Journal of Human Resources, Pan and co-authors show that "sexism", as measured by an index of questions asked in the General Social Survey, varies considerably across US states, and adversely affects women's labor market outcomes where they currently reside. To achieve this, she leverages plausibly exogenous variation in migration patterns resulting from settlement patterns of past waves of migrants and the physical distance between different labor markets.

==== Education and disruptive behavior ====
In work with Marianne Bertrand in the American Economic Journal: Applied Economics, Pan shows that there exists a large divide between the social and behavioral outcomes of boys and girls brought up in single-parent homes. By the age of 10–11, Pan shows that boys in single-parent households are much more likely to get suspended than their female counterparts. This is despite little effect of early school environment on subsequent non-cognitive gaps between girls and boys.

== Selected publications ==
- Bertrand, Marianne; Pan, Jessica (1 January 2013). "The Trouble with Boys: Social Influences and the Gender Gap in Disruptive Behavior". American Economic Journal: Applied Economics. 5 (1): 32–64. doi:10.1257/app.5.1.32. ISSN 1945-7782. S2CID 55049353.
- Bertrand, Marianne; Kamenica, Emir; Pan, Jessica (29 January 2015). "Gender Identity and Relative Income within Households". The Quarterly Journal of Economics. 130 (2): 571–614. doi:10.1093/qje/qjv001. ISSN 0033-5533.
- Charles, Kerwin Kofi; Guryan, Jonathan; Pan, Jessica (10 November 2022). "The Effects of Sexism on American Women: The Role of Norms vs. Discrimination". Journal of Human Resources. doi:10.3368/jhr.0920-11209R3. ISSN 0022-166X.
