= Sendhil Mullainathan =

American economist (born c. 1973)

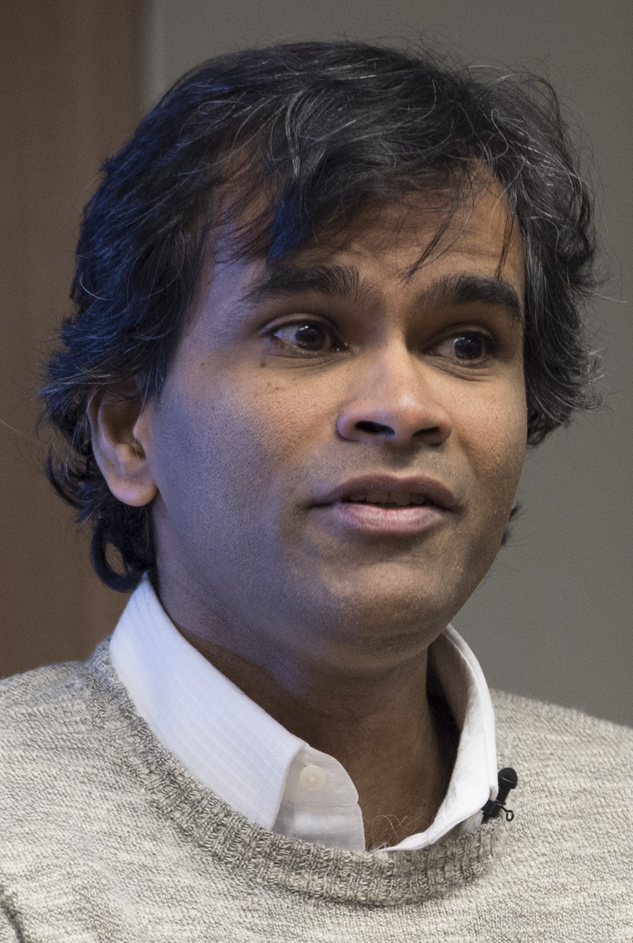
- Mullainathan in 2014
- Born: c. 1973 (age 52–53); Tamil Nadu, India
- Citizenship: United States
- Education: Cornell University (BA); Harvard University (PhD)
- Known for: Behavioral economics Development economics Corporate finance
- Awards: MacArthur Fellow
- Scientific career
- Fields: Economics, Behavioral economics
- Workplaces: MIT 2024– University of Chicago Booth School of Business 2018–2024; Harvard University 2004–2018; MIT 1999–2004
- Doctoral advisor: Drew Fudenberg; Lawrence Katz; Andrei Shleifer
- Doctoral students: Ebonya Washington; Benjamin Jones

Sendhil Mullainathan (born c. 1973) is an American professor of economics and professor of electrical engineering and computer science at the Massachusetts Institute of Technology.

== Early life and career ==
Born in a small farming village in Tamil Nadu, India, Mullainathan moved to the Los Angeles area in 1980. His father studied and later worked in aerospace engineering. As security clearance laws in the US aerospace industry were tightened in the 1980s, his father lost his job. His parents subsequently operated a video store.

He received his B.A. in computer science, mathematics, and economics from Cornell University in 1993 and he completed his Ph.D. in economics from Harvard University 1993–1998.

Mullainathan was a professor of Computation and Behavioral Science at the University of Chicago Booth School of Business from 2018 to 2024. He is the author of Scarcity: Why Having Too Little Means So Much (with Eldar Shafir). He was hired with tenure by Harvard in 2004 after having spent six years at MIT.

Mullainathan is a recipient of a MacArthur Foundation "genius grant" and conducts research on development economics, behavioral economics, and corporate finance. He is co-founder of Ideas 42, a non-profit organization that uses behavioral science to help solve social problems, and J-PAL, the MIT Poverty Action Lab and has made extensive academic contributions through the National Bureau of Economic Research and has also worked in government at the Consumer Financial Protection Bureau (CFPB). In May 2018, he moved from Harvard to the University of Chicago Booth School of Business, becoming the George C. Tiao Faculty Fellow. In November 2018, he received the Infosys Prize (in Social Sciences category), one of the highest monetary awards in India that recognize excellence in science and research, for his contributions to the field of economics, especially behavioral economics. In 2024, he moved back to MIT as a professor on joint appointment between the Department of Economics and the School of Engineering.

== Research contributions ==
He has made substantial contributions to the field of behavioral economics as well as innovative additions to the literature on development topics, such as discrimination, corruption, and corporate governance. According to IDEAS/RePEc, he ranked 185th in September 2018 in terms of research among 54 233 registered economists (i.e., among the top 0.4%).

Mullainathan's research topics have included cigarette taxes, corruption in obtaining driving licenses in Delhi, executive compensation, and the impact of poverty on cognitive function.

His influential 2004 paper "Are Emily and Greg More Employable Than Lakisha and Jamal? A Field Experiment on Labor Market Discrimination" used a simple technique to measure labor market discrimination by switching the names at the top of resumes. Controlling for other factors, Mullainathan and his co-authors found that applications with white sounding names attained 50% more callbacks.

His most-cited paper is a statistical methodology article, coauthored with Marianne Bertrand and Esther Duflo, which shows that a statistical procedure that is commonly used in the empirical economics literature frequently drastically overstates the statistical significance of the results. The article, "How Much Should We Trust Differences-In-Differences Estimates?" shows that when a trend is occurring, a statistical test of whether there has been a "before and after" change regarding some event, such as the passage of a law, is likely to find that there has been a significant change due to the passage of the law even when the law had no effect on the trend.

== Selected bibliography ==
=== Books ===
- Mullainathan, Sendhil; Kling, Jeffrey R.; Congdon, William J. (2012). Policy and choice: public finance through the lens of behavioral economics. Washington: Brookings Institution Press. ISBN 9780815722588.
- Mullainathan, Sendhil; Shafir, Eldar (2013). Scarcity: why having too little means so much. London: Allen Lane, an imprint of Penguin Books. ISBN 9781846143458.

=== Journal articles ===
- Mullainathan, Sendhil; Bertrand, Marianne; Luttmer, Erzo F.P. (2000). "Network effects and welfare cultures". The Quarterly Journal of Economics. 115 (3): 1019–1055. doi:10.1162/003355300554971. hdl:1721.1/63969.
- Mullainathan, Sendhil; Bertrand, Marianne (May 2000). "Agents with and without principals". American Economic Review. 90 (2): 203–208. doi:10.1257/aer.90.2.203.
- Mullainathan, Sendhil; Bertrand, Marianne (2001). "Are CEOs rewarded for luck? The ones without principals are". The Quarterly Journal of Economics. 116 (3): 901–932. doi:10.1162/00335530152466269.
- Mullainathan, Sendil, Bertrand, Marianne, Duflo, Esther (February 2004) "How Much Should We Trust Differences-In-Differences Estimates?" Quarterly Journal of Economics 119 (1): 249–275. doi:10.1162/003355304772839588
- Mullainathan, Sendhil; Bertrand, Marianne (September 2004). "Are Emily and Greg more employable than Lakisha and Jamal? A field experiment on labor market discrimination" (PDF). American Economic Review. 94 (4): 991–1013. doi:10.1257/0002828042002561.
- Mullainathan, Sendhil; Bertrand, Marianne; Djankov, Simeon; Hanna, Rema (2007). "Obtaining a driver's license in India: an experimental approach to studying corruption". The Quarterly Journal of Economics. 122 (4): 1639–1676. doi:10.1162/qjec.2007.122.4.1639.
- Mullainathan, Sendhil; Bertrand, Marianne; Shafir, Eldar; Karlan, Dean; Zinman, Jonathan (2010). "What's advertising content worth? Evidence from a consumer credit marketing field experiment" (PDF). The Quarterly Journal of Economics. 125 (1): 263–306. doi:10.1162/qjec.2010.125.1.263. hdl:10419/27007. S2CID 3231264.
- Mullainathan, Sendhil; Shafir, Eldar; Mani, Anandi; Zhao, Jiaying (30 August 2013). "Poverty impedes cognitive function". Science. 341 (6149): 976–980. Bibcode:2013Sci...341..976M. doi:10.1126/science.1238041. PMID 23990553. S2CID 1684186.

=== Papers ===
- Mullainathan, Sendhil; Bertrand, Marianne (November 1998). "Is there discretion in wage setting? A test using takeover legislation". NBER Working Paper. 6807. doi:10.3386/w6807.
- Mullainathan, Sendhil; Bertrand, Marianne (December 1998). "Executive compensation and incentives the impact of takeover legislation". NBER Working Paper. 6830. doi:10.3386/w6830. hdl:1721.1/63539.
- Mullainathan, Sendhil; Bertrand, Marianne; Miller, Douglas (March 2000). "Public policy and extended families: evidence from South Africa". NBER Working Paper. 7594. doi:10.3386/w7594. hdl:1721.1/64101.
- Mullainathan, Sendhil; Gruber, Jonathan (April 2002). "Do cigarette taxes make smokers happier?". NBER Working Paper. 8872. doi:10.3386/w8872.
- Mullainathan, Sendhil; Bertrand, Marianne (February 2005). "Profitable investments or dissipated cash? evidence on the investment-cash flow relationship from oil and gas lease bidding". NBER Working Paper. 11126. doi:10.3386/w11126.
- Mullainathan, Sendhil; Banerjee, Abhijit (May 2010). "The shape of temptation: implications for the economic lives of the poor". NBER Working Paper. 15973. doi:10.3386/w15973. hdl:1721.1/64250.
