= Debraj Ray (economist) =

Indian-American economist (born 1957)

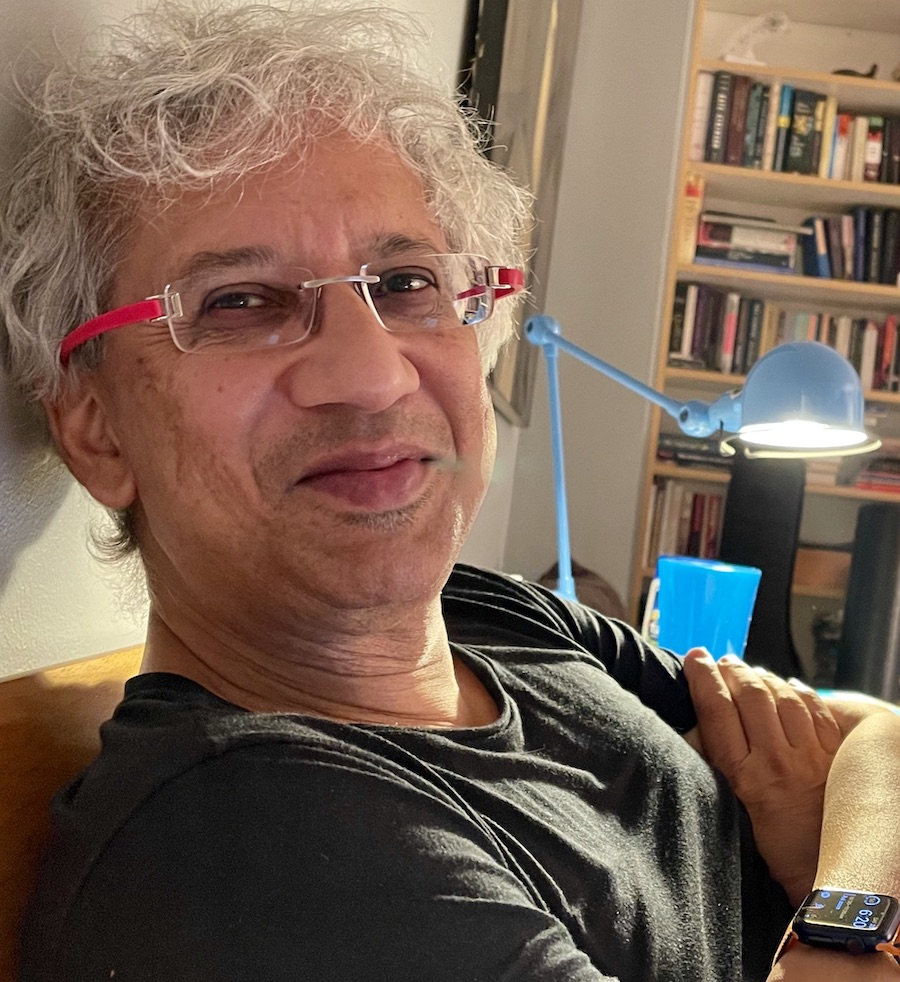
- Debraj Ray in 2020
- Born: 3 September 1957 (age 69)
- Citizenship: United States

Academic background
- Education: University of Calcutta (B.A.); Cornell University (M.A., Ph.D.)

Academic work
- Discipline: Game theory Development Economics
- School or tradition: Game theory
- Institutions: New York University
- Doctoral students: Rohini Somanathan

Debraj Ray (born 3 September 1957) is an Indian-American economist, who is currently teaching and working at New York University. His research interests focus on development economics and game theory. Ray served as Co-editor of the American Economic Review between 2012 and 2020.

Ray is Julius Silver Professor in the Faculty of Arts and Science, New York University, since 2003, and Professor of Economics at New York University since 1999. He is also a Part-Time Professor at the University of Warwick. He is a Research Affiliate at the National Bureau of Economic Research, a council member of the Game Theory Society, and a board member of Theoretical Research in Development Economics (ThReD). He served as a board member at the Bureau for Research in the Economic Analysis of Development (BREAD), since its inception till 2023.

== Education ==
Debraj Ray graduated from the University of Calcutta, where he earned a B.A. in economics in 1977. After that, Ray obtained a M.A. (1981) and a Ph.D. (1983) both from Cornell University, where his doctoral supervisor was Mukul Majumdar. The title of his dissertation is Essays in Intertemporal Economics.

== Academic career ==
Prior to joining NYU, Ray held academic positions at Stanford University, the Indian Statistical Institute, and at Boston University, where he was Director of the Institute for Economic Development. He has held visiting appointments at Harvard University, MIT, the Instituto Nacional de Matemática Pura e Aplicada in Rio de Janeiro, Brazil, the People's University of China in Beijing, the London School of Economics, Columbia University, the Instituto de Análisis Económico in Barcelona and the University of Oslo.

Notable contributions by Ray include:

- a concept of egalitarianism under participation constraints (Dutta and Ray 1989);
- a theory of renegotiation in dynamic games (Bernheim and Ray 1989, Ray 1994);
- a theory of poverty traps based on undernutrition, and later related work on persistent inequality (Dasgupta and Ray 1986, Dasgupta and Ray 1987, Baland and Ray 1991, Mookherjee and Ray 2003);
- the development of a concept of polarization, and its connections to social conflict (Esteban and Ray 1994, Duclos, Esteban and Ray 2004, Esteban and Ray 2011);
- a theory of coalition formation (Ray and Vohra 1997, Ray and Vohra 1999, Ray 2008);
- a theory of socially determined aspirations (Ray 2006, Genicot and Ray 2017);
- a leading textbook in Development Economics (Ray 1998).

== Professional affiliations and awards ==
Ray is a Fellow of the American Academy of Arts and Sciences, a Fellow of the Econometric Society, a Fellow of the Bureau for Research and Economic Analysis of Development, a Fellow of the Society for the Advancement of Economic Theory, a Guggenheim Fellow, a recipient of the Mahalanobis Memorial Medal, and a recipient of the Outstanding Young Scientists Award in mathematics from the Indian National Science Academy. He was awarded a Doctor Philosophiae Honoris Causa from the University of Oslo in 2011.

Apart from three terms as Co-editor of the American Economic Review, Ray has served on the editorial board of Econometrica, the Journal of Economic Theory, the Journal of Development Economics, the Journal of Economic Growth, the Japanese Economic Review, Games and Economic Behavior, American Economic Journal Microeconomics. He has served as a Foreign Editor of the Review of Economic Studies, and as Co-editor of the Econometric Society journal, Theoretical Economics.

Among Ray's many public lectures are the 2013 Sir Richard Stone Annual Lecture at the University of Cambridge, the 2016 Laffont Lecture of the Econometric Society (Geneva), the 2017 Richard Ely Distinguished Lectures at Johns Hopkins University, the 2022 Haavelmo Lecture at the University of Oslo, and the inaugural Ashok Kotwal Memorial Lecture (Ideas for India, New Delhi, 2022).

Ray has received many awards for his teaching and research from different institutions around the world. Among them are:

- Mahalanobis Memorial Medal of the Indian Econometric Society, 1989
- Fellow of the Econometric Society, 1993
- Gittner Teaching Award from Boston University, 1996
- Guggenheim Fellow, 1997
- Dean's Award for Distinguished Teaching at Stanford University, 1985
- Fellow of the American Academy of Arts and Sciences, 2016
- Doctor Philosophiae Honoris Causa from University of Oslo, 2011
- Fellow of the Society for the Advancement of Economic Theory, 2011
- Golden Dozen Teaching Award for excellence in undergraduate teaching from New York University, 2017

== Bibliography ==
=== Books ===
- Ray, Debraj (1990). Dutta, B.; Gangopadhyay, S.; Mookherjee, D. (eds.). Economic Theory and Policy: Essays in Honour of Dipak Banerji. New Delhi: Oxford University Press.
- Ray, Debraj (1992). Dutta, B.; Mookherjee, D.; Parthasarathy, T.; Raghavan, T.; Tijs, S. (eds.). Game Theory and Economic Applications. New Delhi: Springer Verlag.
- Ray, Debraj (1993). Dutta, B.; Gangopadhyay, S.; Mookherjee, D. (eds.). Theoretical Issues in Economic Development. New Delhi: Oxford University Press.
- Ray, Debraj (1997). Dutta, B.; Potters, J.; Parthasarathy, T.; Sen, A. (eds.). Game-Theoretical Applications to Economics and Operations Research. Kluwer Academic Publishers.
- Ray, Debraj (1998). Development Economics. Princeton University Press.
- Ray, Debraj (2000). Mookherjee, D. (ed.). Readings in the Theory of Economic Development. London: Blackwell.
- Ray, Debraj; Bose, A.; Sarkar, A. (2001). Contemporary Macroeconomics. New Delhi: Oxford University Press.
- Ray, Debraj (2008). A Game-Theoretic Perspective on Coalition Formation. New York: Oxford University Press.

=== Selected Journal Articles ===
- Ray, Debraj; Dasgupta, Partha (1986). "Inequality as a Determinant of Malnutrition and Unemployment, I. Theory". Economic Journal. 96 (384): 1011–1034. doi:10.2307/2233171.
- Ray, Debraj; Dutta, Bhaskar. (1989). "A Concept of Egalitarianism Under Participation Constraints". Econometrica. 57: 615–635. doi:10.2307/1911055.
- Ray, Debraj; Bernheim, B. Douglas. (1989). "Collective Dynamic Consistency in Repeated Games". Games and Economic Behavior. 1 (4): 295–326. doi:10.1016/0899-8256(89)90020-1.
- Ray, Debraj; Genicot, G. (2017). "Aspirations and Inequality" (PDF). Econometrica. 85 (2): 489–519. doi:10.3982/ECTA13865. S2CID 8082979.
- Ray, Debraj (2017). "Kenneth Arrow". El Trimestre Económico. 84 (336): 761–769. doi:10.20430/ete.v84i336.605.
- Ray, Debraj; Robson, A. (2018). "Certified Random: A New Order for Co-Authorship" (PDF). American Economic Review. 108 (2): 489–520. doi:10.1257/aer.20161492. S2CID 13007924.
- Ray, Debraj; Anderson, S. (2019). "Missing Unmarried Women". Journal of the European Economic Association. 17 (5): 1585–1616. doi:10.1093/jeea/jvy027.
- Ray, Debraj; Vohra, R. (2019). "Maximality in the Farsighted Stable Set" (PDF). Econometrica. 87 (5): 1763–1779. doi:10.3982/ECTA16047.
- Ray, Debraj; Lou, Y.; Parsa, S.; Li, D.; Wang, S. (2019). "Information Aggregation In a Financial Market With General Signal Structure" (PDF). Journal of Economic Theory. 183: 594–624. doi:10.1016/j.jet.2019.05.004. S2CID 181736975.
- Ray, Debraj; Philip, M.; Subramanian, S. (2021). "Decoding India's Low COVID-19 Case Fatality Rate". Journal of Human Development and Capabilities. 22: 27–51. doi:10.1080/19452829.2020.1863026. S2CID 233223886.
- Ray, Debraj; Vohra, R. (2020). "Games of Love and Hate" (PDF). Journal of Political Economy. 128 (5): 1789–1825. doi:10.1086/705552. S2CID 216323749.
- Ray, Debraj; Subramanian, S. (2020). "India's Lockdown: An Interim Report". Indian Economic Review. 55(S1) (Suppl 1): 31–79. doi:10.1007/s41775-020-00094-2. PMC 7435223. PMID 32836357. S2CID 221174567.
- Ray, Debraj; Genicot, G. (2020). "Aspirations and Economic Behavior". Annual Review of Economics. 12: 715–746. doi:10.1146/annurev-economics-080217-053245. S2CID 212427015.
- Ray, Debraj; Espinosa, F.; Vohra, R. (2021). "A Principal-Agent Relationship With No Advantage to Commitment". Pure and Applied Functional Analysis. 6: 1043–1064.
- Ray, Debraj; Mookherjee, D. (2022). "Growth, Automation, and the Long-Run Share of Labor". Review of Economic Dynamics. 46: 1–26. doi:10.1016/j.red.2021.09.003.
- Ray, Debraj; Mayoral, Laura (2021). "Groups in Conflict: Private and Public Prizes". Journal of Development Economics.
