= Rohini Somanathan =

Indian economist

Academic background
- Education: (B.A) Delhi University (M.A) Delhi School of Economics (PhD)Boston University

Academic work
- Discipline: Economics
- Institutions: Delhi University; Emory University
- Notable ideas: political economy development economics

Rohini Somanathan (born 1965) is an Indian economist focusing on political economy and development economics, and especially on public goods in India. Her research has included work on the conflation of caste with disadvantage as a legacy of colonialism in India, and the effects of high temperatures on worker productivity. She is a professor of economics at the Delhi School of Economics.

== Education and career ==
Somanathan graduated with honours in 1986 from Delhi University, and received a master's degree in economics in 1988 from the Delhi School of Economics. She went to Boston University in the US for doctoral study in economics, and received her Ph.D. in 1996. Her dissertation, School Systems, Educational Attainment, and Wages, was jointly supervised by Debraj Ray and Glenn Loury.

She was a lecturer at Delhi University in 1989–1990, and a visiting assistant professor at Emory University in the US from 1995 to 1998. She became a regular-rank assistant professor at the University of Michigan from 1998 to 2005, while also holding an assistant professorship at the Indian Statistical Institute from 2001 to 2004. She returned to the Delhi School of Economics as a reader in 2005, and has been a professor there since 2008.

== Recognition ==
Somanathan was named as a Fellow of the International Economic Association in 2018, and as a Fellow of the Econometric Society in 2021.
