= Operation HOPE, Inc. =

American personal finance education organization

Operation HOPE, Inc
- Formation: May 5, 1992
- Type: Non-profit
- Headquarters: Atlanta, Georgia
- Region served: United States, South Africa
- Founder, Chairman, Chief Executive Officer: John Hope Bryant
- Website: www.operationhope.org

Operation HOPE, Inc., is an American non-profit organization providing financial literacy empowerment and economic education to youth and adults. The mission of this organization is providing everybody with enterprise work and the programs carried out by Operation HOPE, Inc. Andrew Young is the global spokesman of the organization and John Hope Bryant is the chairman.

== History ==
Operation HOPE, Inc., was founded by John Hope Bryant on May 5, 1992, immediately following the 1992 Rodney King riots in Los Angeles, California.

== Programs and services ==
=== Project 5117 ===
Project 5117's aim is to help the economically weaker section of the society. Project 5117 has an alliance with the U.S. Consumer Financial Protection Bureau (CFPB). Project 5117 stands for 5 million youth empowered, out of them turning 1 million into future entrepreneurs, opening 1,000 empowerment centers and attaining 700 credit score communities.

=== HOPE Corps ===
HOPE Corps comprises Operation HOPE's network of volunteers. The volunteers promote financial self-sufficiency and empowerment in the areas where this kind of knowledge is most helpful.

=== Office of Small Business & Entrepreneurship ===
This wing of Operation HOPE promotes youth entrepreneurship by creating communities of economic opportunities. The program aims to increasing the number of young Americans involved in small business and entrepreneurship.
