= Phyllis Ann Wallace =

American economist (1921–1993)

- Born: June 9, 1921; Calvert County, Maryland, U.S.
- Died: January 10, 1993 (aged 71); Boston, Massachusetts, U.S.

Academic background
- Education: New York University (BA); Yale University (MA, PhD)

Academic work
- Discipline: Economics
- Institutions: City College of New York; National Bureau of Economic Research; Atlanta University (1953–57); Central Intelligence Agency; Equal Employment Opportunity Commission (1965–69); Metropolitan Applied Research Center (1969–72); Massachusetts Institute of Technology (1972–86)
- Awards: National Economic Association's Westerfield Award (1981)

Phyllis A. Wallace (June 9, 1921 – January 10, 1993) was an American economist and activist, as well as the first woman to receive a doctorate of economics at Yale University. Her work tended to focus on racial, as well as gender discrimination in the workplace. She mentored many students and colleagues.

== Early life and education ==
She was born Annie Rebecca Wallace in Calvert County, Maryland, on June 9, 1921. She was the first of six children born to John Wallace, a craftsman, and Stevella Wallace. She attended a well ranked yet segregated high school, Frederick Douglass High School, graduating first in her class in 1939.

Maryland's state University system was segregated. The only state supported higher education open to Wallace was Morgan State College. Afro-American students, like Wallace were not allowed to attend the all-white University of Maryland.

Wallace studied economics at New York University and the state of Maryland paid her tuition. She received her bachelor's degree in economics in 1943, graduating magna cum laude and Phi Beta Kappa. It was probably in New York that she developed her love of art, architecture and music, particularly vocal music.

One of Wallace's NYU Professors suggested that Wallace do graduate work at Yale. At Yale, she earned a master's degree in 1944 and a Ph.D. in 1948. Her dissertation was on international sugar agreements.

== Career ==
As a new Ph.D., Wallace's professional focus was international trade, the subject of her doctoral dissertation. She returned to New York City as a part-time lecturer at City College of New York (a track to tenure not being open) and a researcher at the National Bureau of Economic Research.

In 1953, Wallace took a teaching position in the School of Business Administration at the historically black Atlanta University while maintaining her research relationship with NBER. In 1957, Wallace left teaching, pulled by a new opportunity that arose out of the Cold War. Was the deep south during the Jim Crow era too much for Wallace or was the pull of family and international research the draw?

The CIA was in recruitment mode and Wallace had the right combination of economics training and language ability. She worked at the CIA as an intelligence analyst focusing on the Soviet Union mentoring and befriending many younger CIA employees.

The Civil rights movement of the mid-1960s opened new opportunities. Title VII of the Civil Rights Act of 1964 led to the establishment of the Equal Employment Opportunity Commission the next year. The EEOC's mandate: to "ensure equality of opportunity by vigorously enforcing federal legislation prohibiting discrimination in employment" whether on the basis of religion, race, sex, color, national origin, age, or disability. In 1966, Wallace became the new Commission's Chief of Technical Studies. In this job, Wallace reached out to senior economists and also to young scholars who would go on to distinguished academic careers (Orley Ashenfelter (Princeton), James Heckman (University of Chicago), Ronald Oaxaca (University of Arizona), Lester Thurow (MIT) and Ann Dryden Witte (Wellesley College). Through Wallace, economists had pathbreaking access to data sets that, when analyzed, advanced economic understanding of employment discrimination.

The most consequential case of Wallace's EEOC years, EEOC, Hodgson, and U.S. v. AT&T, involved the employment practices of the 23 subsidiary operating companies of AT&T, with nearly 800,000 workers, then the largest private employer in the United States. AT&T provided enough paper to fill a warehouse. Analysis of the data resulted in a landmark settlement in January 1973 that provided for payment of back wages and benefits to women and minority AT&T employees. It also opened new jobs and career paths for women and minorities at AT&T. Wallace edited a book of articles on the AT&T case, Equal Employment Opportunity and the AT&T Case, in 1976.

In 1969, after setting the AT&T case in motion, Wallace returned to New York to pursue her own deepening research interest in labor markets as a vice president at Metropolitan Applied Research Center, a nonprofit organization founded by Kenneth Clark to focus on the problems of U.S. cities. At MARC, Wallace took on the issues of employment discrimination experienced by urban youth, especially young Black women.

Wallace joined the faculty of MIT in 1972 as a visiting professor and remained in a visiting role until she was tenured as full professor in 1974, in the Sloan School. Her appointment made her the first woman to gain tenure at Sloan. Wallace retired from active teaching in 1986. To honor her career and impact, scholars in industrial and labor relations and economics from around the world gathered at MIT for a conference in her honor. In addition, the Sloan School endowed the Phyllis A. Wallace Doctoral Fellows Fund, which provides support for Black students admitted to the School's doctoral program, and the Phyllis A. Wallace Visiting Scholars Fund to provide support for Black visiting scholars at the School.

Wallace served on a number of corporate and not-for-profit Boards including State Street Bank, TIAA-CREF, Boston Museum of Fine Arts and the Society of Arts and Crafts.

== Life Outside Work ==
Wallace's interests were diverse. She loved classical music, particularly lieder and other vocal music. Her interest in architecture ran toward the Federalist. She used oriental rugs throughout her apartment. She was a woman of taste and distinction.

== Achievements ==
In 1988 Wallace became the first African American and the first female president of the Industrial Relations Research Association. She also garnered several awards for her accomplishments, including National Economic Association's Westerfield Award in 1981, and awards from several universities, including Yale (1980), Mount Holyoke (1983), and Brown University (1986).

== Bibliography ==
Books by Wallace include:

- Pathways to Work: Unemployment among black teenage females (1974), Lexington, MA: Lexington Books
- Equal Employment Opportunity and the AT&T Case (1976), Cambridge, Mass: M.I.T. Press
- Women, Minorities and Employment Discrimination (1977), Lexington, MA: Lexington Books
- Phyllis Ann Wallace; Linda Datcher; Julianne Malveaux (1982) [1980]. Black Women in the Labor Force. MIT Press. ISBN 978-0-262-73063-1.
- Editor, Women in the Workplace (1982), Boston, MA: Auburn House
- MBAs on the Fast Track (1989), New York: Harper and Row
