= Matilde Bombardini =

Italian economist

Matilde Bombardini is an Italian economist, who is a professor of economics of international trade at the Vancouver School of Economics at the University of British Columbia (UBC), Vancouver. She is a fellow of the Canadian Institute for Advanced Research (CIFAR) in the Institutions, Organisations & Growth Program since June 2007 and a research associate at the National Bureau of Economic Research (NBER) for the Political Economy Program since April 2009.

She sits as an advisory committee member for the Empirical Investigations in International Trade (EIIT) conference every year since November 2006. Apart from being revered as a Distinguished Scholar at the Sauder School of Business, she is also the co-editor of the Journal of International Economics since September 2017.

== Early life and education ==
Bombardini began her undergraduate studies in the field of Economics at Università di Bologna and graduated as Bachelor of Arts (BA) in Economics with a magna cum laude in the year 2000. During her time as an undergraduate student, she went for an exchange program to The University of California, Berkeley (UCB) in the year 1998-1999 where she discovered her interest in empirical research surrounding trade. In 2004, she was the winner of the EIIT (Empirical Investigation in International Trade) Graduate Student Competition. In September 2005, she completed her PhD in Economics at the Massachusetts Institute of Technology (MIT). Upon completing her PhD, she was appointed as assistant professor of Economics at the University of British Columbia, Vancouver and has been in UBC ever since. Although, she was also the visiting assistant professor for a year at The Booth School of Business at University of Chicago from August 2009 to June 2010. She was promoted to associate professor at UBC in July 2013 and was also a visiting associate professor for a year at Stanford University from August 2017 to July 2018.

== Career ==
After earning her PhD in 2005, she was appointed as an assistant professor at The University of British Columbia, Vancouver. In July 2013, she was promoted to associate professor at The University of British Columbia. Her work has been published in the American Economic Review, the Canadian Journal of Economics, the Journal of Public Economics and the Journal of International Economics. Bombardini is a fellow of the Canadian Institute for Advanced Research (CIFAR) and a research associate at the National Bureau of Economic Research (NBER) and an Advisory Committee Member for the Empirical Investigations in International Trade (EIIT) conference.

== Publications ==
Bombardini has published numerous papers, receiving 1,224 citations as of 2019.

- Bombardini, Matilde (July 1, 2008). "Firm heterogeneity and lobby participation". Journal of International Economics. 75 (2): 329–348. doi:10.1016/j.jinteco.2008.03.003. ISSN 0022-1996.
- Bombardini, Matilde; Trebbi, Francesco (August 1, 2011). "Votes or money? Theory and evidence from the US Congress" (PDF). Journal of Public Economics. 95 (7): 587–611. doi:10.1016/j.jpubeco.2010.11.018. ISSN 0047-2727., with Francesco Trebbi
- Bombardini, Matilde; Kurz, Christopher J.; Morrow, Peter M. (2012). "Ricardian trade and the impact of domestic competition on export performance". Canadian Journal of Economics. 45 (2): 585–612. doi:10.1111/j.1540-5982.2012.01715.x. ISSN 1540-5982. S2CID 16649950., with Christopher J. Kurz and Peter M. Morrow
- Bombardini, Matilde; Gallipoli, Giovanni; Pupato, Germán (May 2012). "Skill Dispersion and Trade Flows". American Economic Review. 102 (5): 2327–2348. doi:10.1257/aer.102.5.2327. ISSN 0002-8282. S2CID 12427435., with Giovanni Gallipoli and Germán Pupato
- Bombardini, Matilde; Trebbi, Francesco (May 1, 2012). "Competition and political organization: Together or alone in lobbying for trade policy?" (PDF). Journal of International Economics. Symposium on the Global Dimensions of the Financial Crisis. 87 (1): 18–26. doi:10.1016/j.jinteco.2011.11.011. ISSN 0022-1996., with Francesco Trebbi
- Bombardini, Matilde; Trebbi, Francesco (December 1, 2012). "Risk Aversion and Expected Utility Theory: An Experiment with Large and Small Stakes". Journal of the European Economic Association. 10 (6): 1348–1399. doi:10.1111/j.1542-4774.2012.01086.x. ISSN 1542-4766., with Francesco Trebbi
- Bombardini, Matilde; Gallipoli, Giovanni; Pupato, Germán (March 1, 2014). "Unobservable skill dispersion and comparative advantage". Journal of International Economics. 92 (2): 317–329. doi:10.1016/j.jinteco.2013.11.005. ISSN 0022-1996., with Giovanni Gallipoli and Germán Pupato
- Bertrand, Marianne; Bombardini, Matilde; Trebbi, Francesco (December 2014). "Is It Whom You Know or What You Know? An Empirical Assessment of the Lobbying Process". American Economic Review. 104 (12): 3885–3920. doi:10.1257/aer.104.12.3885. ISSN 0002-8282., with Matilde Bombardini and Francesco Trebbi
- "Does Exporting Improve Matching? Evidence from French Employer-Employee Data". Cambridge, MA. May 2015. doi:10.3386/w21225., with Gianluca Orefice and Maria Tito
- Bombardini, Matilde; Li, Bingjing (November 2016). "Trade, Pollution and Mortality in China". Cambridge, MA. doi:10.3386/w22804., with Bingjing Li
- Bertrand, Marianne; Bombardini, Matilde; Fisman, Raymond; Trebbi, Francesco (March 2018). "Tax-Exempt Lobbying: Corporate Philanthropy as a Tool for Political Influence". Cambridge, MA. doi:10.3386/w24451., with Matilde Bombardini, Raymond Fisman, and Francesco Trebbi
- Bombardini, Matilde; Trebbi, Francesco (September 2019). "Empirical Models of Lobbying". Cambridge, MA. doi:10.3386/w26287. S2CID 202545913., with Francesco Trebbi

== Research in progress ==
Her current research focus is simultaneously working on three different projects concerning Political Economy and International Trade. Her first project explores the association between pollution and trade in China. Together with Francesco Trebbi and a team of research assistants, her second project explores the subject of financial regulation, especially the ways in which the Dodd-Frank Wall Street Reform of 2010 is implemented. Her third project focuses on the influence of trade and the link between workers and firms.

== Awards ==
- Canadian Women Economists Network Award, for her work in the intersection of political economy and international trade. (2012, won)
- Harry G. Johnson Prize for best paper in the Canadian Journal of Economics (2013, won)
- Bank of Canada Governor's Award (2015, won)
- Killam Research Prize in the Junior Category for Arts and Humanities at the University of British Columbia, for her contribution in Political Economy and International Trade. (2017, won)
