= Yannis M. Ioannides =

Greek-American economist

Yannis Menelaos Ioannides (Greek: Ιωάννης Μενελάου Ιωαννίδης; born 1945 in Kyparissia, Greece) is a Greek-American economist who received his Ph.D. from Stanford University in 1974 and became Tufts University's Max and Herta Neubauer Chair and Professor in Economics in 1995.
