= List of killings by law enforcement officers in the United States, April 2016 =

This is a list of people reported killed by non-military law enforcement officers in the United States in April 2016, whether in the line of duty or not, and regardless of reason or method. The listing documents the occurrence of a death, making no implications regarding wrongdoing or justification on the part of the person killed or officer involved. Killings are arranged by date of the incident that caused death. Different death dates, if known, are noted in the description. The table below lists 78 people.

== April 2016 ==
Date	Name (age) of deceased	State (city)	Description
2016-04-30	Habana, Marion (28)	California (Los Angeles)	
2016-04-30	Bess, Mark (33)	Utah (Spanish Fork)	
2016-04-30	Mattner, Oswald (42)	Wisconsin (Wasau)	
2016-04-29	Dass, Bender (55)	Arizona (Queen Creek)	
2016-04-29	Hobbs, Jeffrey (48)	Missouri (Jackson)	
2016-04-28	Easter, Lee (53)	Idaho (Boise)	
2016-04-28	Barnes, Ashtian (24)	Texas (Houston)	
2016-04-28	del Rosario, Kendar (37)	Florida (Miami)	
2016-04-28	Kurtz, Michael (45)	Washington (Spokane)	
2016-04-27	Blair, Damon (21)	Colorado (Westminster)	
2016-04-27	Mung, Cin Lam (34)	Georgie (Atlanta)	
2016-04-27	Anderson, David (36)	Utah (Milcreek)	
2016-04-26	Burke, Jacquelyn (24)	New Mexico (Albuquerque)	
2016-04-26	Machemehl, Darrel (44)	Texas (Kingsbury)	
2016-04-26	Brooks, Joshua (26)	Virginia (Chesapeake)	
2016-04-26	Barber, Robin (28)	Colorado (Lakewood)	
2016-04-25	Campbell, Kay (60)	North Carolina (East Flat Rock)	
2016-04-24	Macomber, Bradford (53)	Mississippi (Gulfport)	
2016-04-23	Wakup, Eric (30)	Virginia (Norfolk)	
2016-04-23	Wagner, Jakob (18)	Wisconsin (Antigo)	
2016-04-23	Semer, Demarcus (21)	Florida (Fort Pierce)	Sgt. Brian MacNaught and officer Keith Holmes initiated a traffic stop of Semer's car for speeding. During the stop, MacNaught opened the passenger door to speak to Semer, before trying to pull him out of the car. In response, Semer began to drive away, knocking Holmes over and causing MacNaught to jump into the car. After this, Holmes fired twice at the car, believing MacNaught was about to be run over. MacNaught believer that Semer was the shooter, and fired his stun gun at him. Semer then left the car and ran towards a house before pointing an object at MacNaught, which police later learned was his cellphone. MacNaught fired six shots at him, one of which hit Semer and killed him.
2016-04-23	Tillman, Willie (33)	Arkansas (Fayetteville)	
2016-04-23	Oakley, Mitchell (24)	Arizona (Chandler)	
2016-04-22	Baranishyn, Carl (51)	New York (Berne)	
2016-04-22	Hunkin, Tyler (29)	Texas (Austin)	
2016-04-21	Martinez, Mario (48)	Massachusetts (Everett)	
2016-04-21	Bascom, Nikki (31)	New Mexico (Silver City)	
2016-04-20	Kirkham, Jackie (52)	Arkansas (Perryville)	
2016-04-20	Dufore, Francis (41)	Florida (Homestead)	
2016-04-19	Scruggs, Jorevis (15)	Missouri (St. Louis)	
2016-04-19	Ackhavong, Sylasone (41)	North Carolina (Charlotte)	
2016-04-19	Blackmon, Daniel (38)	Alabama (Blountsville)	
2016-04-18	Dorsey, Demetrius (18)	Georgia (Mableton)	
2016-04-18	Johnson, Rico (28)	Maryland (Greenbelt)	
2016-04-17	Tillman, George (32)	New York (New York City)	
2016-04-17	Arrone, Kisha (35)	Ohio (Dayton)	
2016-04-17	Thevenin, Edson (37)	New York (Troy)	
2016-04-17	Bard, Richard (31)	New Jersey (Vineland)	
2016-04-17	Wilson, Eric John (22)	Texas (El Paso)	According to police sources a 22-year old man threatened to "shoot it out with officers," and told them he had two handguns and a rifle. He then appeared to pull an object from behind his back and pointed it at officers before walking toward them, leading them to shoot him. Police later learned the man was holding a cell phone and did not have any weapons on him.
2016-04-16	Boyes, Gerald (53)	Illinois (Antioch)	
2016-04-15	Swatsky, David (52)	Oklahoma (Cache)	
2016-04-15	Howard, Robert (44)	Maryland (Baltimore)	
2016-04-15	Najera-Aguirre, Clemente (38)	California (Lake Elsinore)	
2016-04-15	Smith, Storm Allen	Indiana (Muncie)	Muncie Police Department Chief Steve Stewart said officers responded to a reported threat at a home around 7:40 p.m. Stewart said a man was shot by the officer in a nearby field. It is unknown if the man was armed. The male officer, who was injured, was taken to a local hospital in unknown condition, Stewart said.
2016-04-14	Robertson, Jeff (54)	Kansas (McPherson)	
2016-04-13	Watts, Rodney (35)	California (Stockton)	
2016-04-13	Wise, Jeffrey (52)	Texas (Llano)	
2016-04-13	Whitson, Koltlee (26)	Tennessee (Sparta)	
2016-04-12	Moreno, Joshua (38)	Illinois (Benton)	
2016-04-12	Wood, Travis (20)	Florida (Noma)	
2016-04-12	Damon, Dion (40)	Colorado (Denver)	Police approached Damon's car in connection with an earlier bank robbery. Denver police killed Damon after he didn't leave his car with his hands in the air. Damon was unarmed.
2016-04-11	Trujillo, Efren (22)	Nevada (Las Vegas)	
2016-04-11	Loury, Pierre (16)	Illinois (Chicago)	Loury was shot and killed after fleeing police on foot. According to police statement, Loury was shot once in the chest after first fleeing a car after a police stop, then threatening an officer with a gun.
2016-04-10	Yobani-Torrez Valdez, Arturo (28)	California (Los Angeles)	
2016-04-10	Ball, Lonnie (39)	California (Modesto)	
2016-04-10	Clark, William (30)	New York (Rotterdam)	
2016-04-10	Soto, Luis (29)	Tennessee (Memphis)	
2016-04-09	Williams, Quron (19)	Pennsylvania (Philadelphia)	An off-duty Philadelphia police officer shot and killed a robbery suspect at a T-Mobile store in the Ogontz section of the city. The incident took place at about 2:26 p.m. near Broad and Chew streets. The suspect was transported to Einstein Medical Center and was pronounced dead shortly after 3 p.m. The officer was not injured, police said.
2016-04-09	Grant, Diahlo (27)	New Jersey (New Brunswick)	Franklin Township police officers pursued Diahlo on foot into New Brunswick, before gunfire was exchanged at about 1:30 a.m. Grant died about two hours later at Robert Wood Johnson University Hospital.
2016-04-08	Flenaugh, Dazion (40)	California (Sacramento)	
2016-04-08	Gulley, Lamont (43)	Michigan (Kentwood)	
2016-04-08	Abbott, Melissa (25)	Wisconsin (Lake Hallie)	Chippewa County Sheriff Jim Kowalczyk says the developmentally-disabled woman was shopping with chaperones at the Wal-Mart in Lake Hallie. Police were called around 5 p.m. after she grabbed a hatchet off a shelf and began swinging it around. The sheriff says a Lake Hallie police officer shot her twice after she refused to drop the hatchet and lunged at the officer. She was taken to an Eau Claire hospital with wounds to the abdomen and thigh, and later died.
2016-04-07	Gongora, Luis (45)	California (San Francisco)	Police Chief Greg Suhr said officers received a call from a member of The City's Homeless Outreach Team, who reported a man was waving a kitchen knife that had a 10- to 12-inch blade. Suhr said officers first fired bean-bag rounds at the suspect, but shot him after he challenged them with the knife.
2016-04-07	McIntire, Lance (44)	Nebraska (Omaha)	Authorities say an Omaha police gang unit officer shot a "known suspect" in a parking lot at about 4:20 p.m. The suspect was taken in critical condition to the Nebraska Medical Center, where he later died.
2016-04-06	Cremeans, Marvin (60)	Ohio (Oak Hill)	
2016-04-06	Erdman, Christopher (39)	Florida (Bradenton)	
2016-04-06	Sweatt, Leronda (40)	Tennessee (Gallatin)	Around 9 a.m., police officer James Spray was called to a home where Sweatt had stabbed a Sumner County sheriff's deputy who was serving her an eviction notice. Body camera footage shows Spray arriving at the house and yelling at Sweatt to "get on the ground," before telling her to "drop it" as she walks towards him with an ax. The officer fired two shots, and Sweatt died after being taken to a local hospital.
2016-04-05	Hicks, Kevin (44)	Indiana (Indianapolis)	
2016-04-05	Doherty, Peter (52)	Massachusetts (West Springfield)	
2016-04-05	Frias, Cesar (20)	California (Los Angeles)	Frias was shot after a stand-off.
2016-04-04	Marquez-Heraldes, Raul (50)	Minnesota (Minneapolis)	
2016-04-03	Perez, Preston (48)	Louisiana (Raceland)	
2016-04-03	Boarts, Melissa (36)	Alabama (Notasulga)	
2016-04-03	Mack, David (69)	Wisconsin (Eau Claire)	
2016-04-03	Martin, Darrin (25)	Texas (Austin)	Armando Perez, an Austin police officer trying to subdue a suspect seen breaking into cars in an affluent downtown neighborhood, was shot by the man. Perez returned fire, police said, killing Martin. The Travis County District Attorney ruled on October 19, 2016, Officer Perez will not face charges related to the shooting death of Martin.
2016-04-02	Gover, Cameron (30)	Indiana (Indianapolis)	
2016-04-01	Fabela, Joel (37)	Texas (Odessa)	
2016-04-01	Juarez, Jesse (65)	Texas (Lockhart)	At 4:27 a.m., a deputy on the scene of a reported home burglary was flagged down by the initial complainant, who had located Juarez near the Dairy Queen directly behind the home. The Caldwell County Sheriff's Office says the deputy told other officers on the scene the suspect had armed himself with a shovel. Moments later, shots were fired by law enforcement. Juarez died at the scene.

== See also ==
- Death in custody § United States
- Henry A. Wallace Police Crime Public Database
- List of cases of police brutality
- List of countries with annual rates and counts for killings by law enforcement officers
- List of law enforcement officers killed in the line of duty in the United States
- List of law enforcement officers convicted for an on-duty killing in the United States
- List of shootings by US immigration agents
- List of police reforms related to the George Floyd protests
- List of unarmed African Americans killed by law enforcement officers in the United States
- Lists of killings by law enforcement officers
- Police brutality in the United States
- Police misconduct § United States
- Police riot § United States
- Police use of deadly force in the United States
