= President's Advisory Council on Financial Capability =

The President's Advisory Council on Financial Capability (established by Obama On January 29, 2010, by signing Executive Order 13530) was the successor to the President's Advisory Council on Financial Literacy (established by Bush, January 22, 2008). The last meeting of committee was in November 2012, and the Council officially ended on January 29, 2013. Its mission was to "improve Americans' understanding of financial products and terms, expand financial access, and provide appropriate and robust consumer protection." It was operated by the U.S. Treasury Department.

== Members ==
Eldar Shafir, a Princeton University psychology professor who focuses on behavioral economics, his appointment to the Council was announced April 9, 2012.

== See also ==
- Financial literacy
