= Betsy Levy Paluck =

American psychology professor

- Education: Yale University (BS); Yale University (PhD)
- Scientific career
- Fields: Social norms, networks and influence; Media effects; Prejudice and conflict resolution; Gender; Methodology
- Workplaces: Kahneman-Treisman Center for Behavioral Science & Policy, Princeton University
- Website: www.betsylevypaluck.com

Elizabeth (Betsy) Levy Paluck is a professor in the department of psychology and the Princeton School of Public and International Affairs at Princeton University, where she also serves as deputy director of the Center for Behavioral Science & Policy. She is known for her work on prejudice, social norms and conflict reduction. She is best known for creating large-scale field experiments utilizing theoretical social psychology strategies and tools to formulate effective and practical methods for reducing conflict and discrimination. Due to her extensive work investigating the influences of the Rwandan genocide and her work with high school bullying, Paluck is considered a leading authority on field-tested methods of changing intolerant and aggressive social behavior.

In 2017, Paluck won the MacArthur Fellow Award, known as the "Genius Grant" for "[u]nraveling how social networks and norms influence our interactions with one another and identifying interventions that can change destructive behavior."

Paluck has published over 50 academic papers and has been profiled, quoted and interviewed in the New Yorker, Slate, NPR, the Cut and various Psychology magazines.

== Advisory positions and distinctions ==
- Ideas 42, Senior Researcher, Advisory Board
- Princeton University Old Dominion Faculty Fellow
- Princeton University Experiments in Governance and Politics, Executive Committee (EGAP)
- Consortium for Police Leadership in Equity
- Affiliate, Crime Lab New York, Urban Labs, University of Chicago

== Select awards ==
- 2024 American Academy of Political and Social Science Award
- 2017 MacArthur Award Winner, "Genius Grant"
- 2013 The Sage Young Scholars Award from the Society of Personal and Social Psychology
- 2010 Cialdini Prize for Field Research

== Selected articles ==
- Paluck, E. L. (2006). Diversity training and intergroup contact: A call to action research. Journal of Social Issues, 62(3), 577–595.
- Paluck, E. L. (2009). Reducing intergroup prejudice and conflict using the media: a field experiment in Rwanda. Journal of Personality and Social Psychology, 96(3), 574–587.
- Paluck, E. L., & Green, D. P. (2009). Deference, dissent, and dispute resolution: An experimental intervention using mass media to change norms and behavior in Rwanda. American Political Science Review, 103(4), 622–644.
- Paluck, E. L., & Green, D. P. (2009). Prejudice reduction: What works? A review and assessment of research and practice. Annual Review of Psychology, 60, 339–367.
- Paluck, E. L., & Shepherd, H. (2012). The salience of social referents: A field experiment on collective norms and harassment behavior in a school social network. Journal of Personality and Social Psychology, 103(6), 899–915.
