= Ideas for India =

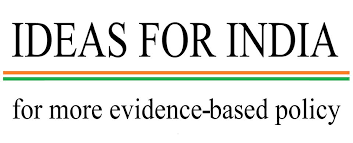
- Formation: 2012
- Editor-in-Chief: Parikshit Ghosh
- Parent organization: International Growth Centre
- Website: www.ideasforindia.in

Ideas for India (I4I) was launched in 2012 by a group of economists at the International Growth Centre. I4I is an economics and policy portal that publishes analysis and commentary on issues pertaining to growth and development in India.

As described by The Economist, I4I "Gives economists (and other academics) in India and beyond a chance to write for non-expert readers". The portal serves as a space for economists, other social scientists, and practitioners to use their research and experience to weigh in on policy questions. I4I carries posts on topics covering agriculture, governance, environment, and poverty and inequality, among others.

== Background ==
Conceived as a means to "plug the loophole" of insufficient evidence-based policy ideas and discussion, I4I is a not-for-profit portal and has a contributor pool of over 1,400 contributors from across policy stakeholder groups including academia and research, think tanks, multilateral organizations, civil society organizations, policy practitioners, private sector, and so on. Posts on the website are in the form of research-based "Articles", opinion-based "Perspectives", experience-based "Notes from the Field", explainers, e-symposia, podcasts, videos, and panel discussions.

In 2018, a Hindi section, carrying translations of the portal's selected English content, was launched. Content from I4I has been reprinted and mentioned in articles in media publications, and in notable policy documents.
