= Linda Datcher Loury =

American economist

- Born: January 19, 1952; Baltimore, Maryland, U.S.
- Died: September 22, 2011 (aged 59); Brookline, Massachusetts, U.S.
- Spouse: Glenn Loury (m. 1983)
- Children: 2

Academic background
- Education: Swarthmore College (BA); Massachusetts Institute of Technology (PhD)

Academic work
- Discipline: Social economics
- Institutions: Tufts University; University of Michigan

Linda Datcher Loury (January 19, 1952 – September 22, 2011) was an American economist who was a professor of economics at Tufts University. Her work on family and neighborhood economics put her among the founders of social economics.

== Biography ==
Loury was born in Baltimore, Maryland, in 1952. She attended the Friends School of Baltimore, Swarthmore College (where she majored in economics, with a concentration in Black Studies), and earned a PhD from the Massachusetts Institute of Technology in 1978. She held research and teaching positions at the University of Michigan and the Harvard Kennedy School before joining the faculty of Tufts University in 1984, where she worked for the remainder of her life. She married her graduate school classmate Glenn Loury in 1983, and together they raised two sons. While raising her children, she founded a network of African-American families in the Boston area, volunteered in her children's school, and was an active member of her church's efforts to assist disadvantaged children.

She died on September 22, 2011, due to cancer.

== Research ==
Loury conducted particularly influential research on the importance of social interactions and information networks in job markets. For example, she studied the impact of grandparents' educational achievements on their grandchildren, the relationship between job tenure and hiring networks, and the impact of mothers' labor market participation on children's academic achievements.

=== Selected works ===
- (with Phyllis Ann Wallace and Julianne Malveaux) Black women in the labor force. MIT Press (MA), 1980.
- "Effects of mother's home time on children's schooling." The Review of Economics and Statistics (1988): 367–373.
- (with David Garman) "College selectivity and earnings." Journal of Labor Economics 13, no. 2 (1995): 289–308.
- "The gender earnings gap among college-educated workers." ILR Review 50, no. 4 (1997): 580–593.
- (with Yannis M. Ioannides) "Job information networks, neighborhood effects, and inequality." Journal of Economic Literature 42, no. 4 (2004): 1056–1093.
- "Some contacts are more equal than others: Informal networks, job tenure, and wages." Journal of Labor Economics 24, no. 2 (2006): 299–318.
