= Glenn Loury =

American economist, academic, and author (born 1948)

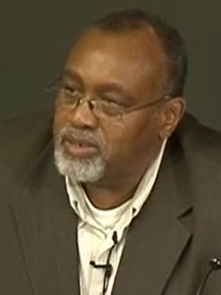
- Born: Glenn Cartman Loury; September 3, 1948 (age 78); Chicago, Illinois, U.S.
- Spouses: Charlene (divorced) Linda Datcher Loury (m. 1983; death 2011) Lajuan Loury (m. 2017)
- Children: 5

Academic background
- Education: Northwestern University (BA); Massachusetts Institute of Technology (PhD)
- Doctoral advisor: Robert Solow
- Influences: Gary Becker; Thomas Sowell

Academic work
- Discipline: Social economics
- Institutions: University of Michigan; Harvard University; Boston University; Brown University
- Doctoral students: Rohini Somanathan
- Notable ideas: Coate–Loury model
- Website: Information at IDEAS / RePEc

Glenn Cartman Loury (born September 3, 1948) is an American economist, academic, and author. He is the Merton P. Stoltz Professor of the Social Sciences at Brown University, where he has taught since 2005 also as a professor of economics. At the age of 33, Loury became the first African American professor of economics at Harvard University to gain tenure. Loury achieved some prominence during the Reagan Era as a leading black conservative intellectual. In the mid-1990s, following a period of seclusion, he came to adopt more progressive views. Loury has somewhat re-aligned with views of the American right, with The New York Times describing his political orientation in 2020 as "conservative-leaning".

== Early life and education ==
Loury was born on September 3, 1948, in the South Side of Chicago, Illinois, growing up in a redlined neighborhood. Loury graduated from John Marshall Harlan High School. Before going to college he fathered two children, and supported them with a job in a printing plant. When he wasn't working he took classes at Southeast Junior College, where he won a scholarship to study at Northwestern University.

In 1972, Loury received a Bachelor of Arts degree in mathematics from Northwestern University. He then received a Ph.D. in economics from the Massachusetts Institute of Technology (MIT) in 1976, writing his dissertation, "Essays in the Theory of the Distribution of Income", under the supervision of Nobel laureate Robert M. Solow. At MIT he met his future wife, Linda Datcher Loury.

== Career ==
Loury became an assistant professor of economics at Northwestern University after receiving his doctorate. In 1979, he moved to teach at the University of Michigan, and was promoted to full professor of economics in 1980. In 1982, at age 33, Loury became the first black tenured professor of economics in the history of Harvard University. He moved to Harvard's Kennedy School of Government after two years. While at Kennedy school he would befriend William Bennett and Bill Kristol. He later said in an interview that his economics appointment was a mistake because he "wasn't yet fully established as a scientist".

In 1987, Loury was under consideration to be an Undersecretary of Education in the Reagan administration. He withdrew from consideration on June 1, three days before citing personal reasons. Loury was arrested for drug possession in December 1987, six months after his assault and battery charges on Pamela Foster. After a subsequent period of seclusion and self-reflection, Loury reemerged as a born-again Christian and described himself as a "black progressive." Loury left Harvard in 1991 to go to Boston University, where he headed the Institute on Race and Social Division. In 2005, Loury left Boston University for Brown University, where he was named a professor in the Economics Department, and a research associate of the Population Studies and Training Center.

Loury's areas of study include applied microeconomic theory: welfare economics, game theory, industrial organization, natural resource economics, and the economics of income distribution. In addition to economics, he has also written extensively on the themes of racial inequality and social policy. Loury testified on racial issues before the Senate Banking Committee on March 4, 2021. and presented at the Bruce D. Benson Center Lecture Series at the University of Colorado Boulder on February 8, 2021. Loury hosts The Glenn Show with John McWhorter, often regarding questions of race and education.

== Political positions ==
On a 2017 episode of the Sam Harris podcast Making Sense, Loury stated that while he used to be "a Reagan conservative", he now thought of himself as a "centrist Democrat, or maybe a mildly right-of-center Democrat". The New York Times has described Loury as "conservative-leaning" and The Wall Street Journal as a "Reagan Republican". On January 9, 2007, Loury had spoken out against increasing the number of U.S. troops in Iraq.

=== Presidential elections and candidates ===
Loury was critical of Barack Obama 2008 presidential campaign. He continued to criticize Obama as president calling his tenure "depressing in the extreme" and also criticized Obama's perceived closeness to Al Sharpton. In 2016, he supported Hillary Clinton. After the 2016 U.S. presidential election, Loury warned it was dangerous for people not to recognize Donald Trump as the 45th President. During debates with John McWhorter, Loury defended Donald Trump. During Trump's presidency he doubted claims that Trump was an existential threat to the public. After Trump refused to concede that he lost the 2020 U.S. presidential election, Loury rebuked him. Loury would later blame Trump for the 2021 U.S. Capitol attack but opposed Trump's second impeachment.

=== Race ===
Loury opposes reparations for slavery and affirmative action. He has said that "affirmative action is not the solution, but neither is it the problem". Conversely, he has criticized affirmative action saying, "Affirmative action is dishonest. It’s not about equality, it’s about covering ass."

In 1984, Loury drew the attention of critics with "A New American Dilemma", published in The New Republic, a piece in which he addressed what he termed "fundamental failures in black society" such as "the lagging academic performance of black students, the disturbingly high rate of black-on-black crime, and the alarming increase in early unwed pregnancies among blacks".

In June 2020, Loury published a rebuttal to a letter that Brown University president Christina Paxson sent to students and alumni in response to the murder of George Floyd by a policeman. Loury questioned the purpose of Paxson's letter, saying it either "affirmed platitudes to which we can all subscribe, or, more menacingly, it asserted controversial and arguable positions as though they were axiomatic certainties."

=== Immigration ===
On immigration, Loury said in an interview segment in The First Measured Century, "There are benefits of immigration, and there are also costs. The benefits in terms of cheaper, eager labor to help we Americans produce the products that we want to consume. The costs are in terms of making it more difficult to equalize the economic circumstances of some Americans who are at the bottom of the heap, because they now have more competition for their labor, as a result of immigration." He has also stated that he supports a tight control on borders and has expressed skepticism at how immigrants can integrate successfully.

== Awards and honors ==
Loury was elected as a member of the Econometric Society in 1994, Vice President of the American Economics Society in 1997, a member of the American Academy of Arts and Sciences in 2000, and a member of the American Philosophical Society in 2011. He was elected president of the Eastern Economics Association in 2013. Loury is a member of the Council on Foreign Relations and is a main academic contributor to the 1776 Unites project. He received the Bradley Prize in 2022, and was named the John Kenneth Galbraith Fellow from the American Academy of Political & Social Science for that same year.

== Personal life ==
Loury fathered two children as a teenager with his first wife, Charlene. He also has a son from another relationship, Alden, who serves as data projects editor for WBEZ in Chicago. Loury and his wife, Linda Datcher Loury, had two sons together. Linda died in 2011. He has since remarried.

Loury launched a podcast, The Glenn Show, in 2007 where he discusses present day issues with guests. The podcast has surpassed 44,000 subscribers on Substack and has millions of views on Youtube.

Loury published his memoir, titled Late Admissions: Confessions of a Black Conservative, in 2024. Loury admits to drug use, an affair, domestic disputes, multiple arrests, involvement in prostitution, and other personal details.

On October 17, 2026, Loury announced on livestream with John McWhorter than he had been told by a doctor that it was highly probable that he had Parkinson's disease.

== Publications ==
- Loury, Glenn C. (2024). Late Admissions: Confessions of a Black Conservative. W. W. Norton & Company. ISBN 978-0-393-88135-6.
- Loury, Glenn (1995). One by One From the Inside Out: Essays and Reviews on Race and Responsibility in America (First ed.). New York: Free Press. ISBN 978-0-02-919441-6.
- "Social Exclusion and Ethnic Groups: The Challenge to Economics" (PDF). Boston University. 1999. Archived (PDF) from the original on September 20, 2020.
- Loury, Glenn (2002). The Anatomy of Racial Inequality. Cambridge, MA: Harvard University Press. ISBN 978-0-674-00625-6.
- Loury, Glenn; Modood, Tariq; Teles, Steven (2005). Ethnicity, Social Mobility and Public Policy: Comparing the US and the UK. Cambridge, MA: Harvard University Press. ISBN 978-0-521-82309-8.
- Loury, Glenn; Karlan, Pamela; Wacquant, Loic; Shelby, Tommie (2008). Race, Incarceration, and American Values. A Boston review book. Cambridge, MA: MIT Press. ISBN 978-0-262-12311-2.
- Loury, Glenn C. (2025). Self-Censorship. John Wiley & Sons. ISBN 978-1-5095-6741-6.

== See also ==
- Roland Fryer
