= Taste-based discrimination =

Economic model of discrimination

Taste-based discrimination is an economic model of labor market discrimination which argues that employers' prejudice or dislikes in an organisational culture rooted in prohibited grounds can have negative results in hiring minority workers, meaning that they can be said to have a taste for discrimination. The model further posits that employers discriminate against minority applicants to avoid interacting with them, regardless of the applicant's productivity, and that employers are willing to pay a financial penalty to do so. It is one of the two leading theoretical explanations for labor market discrimination, the other being statistical discrimination. The taste-based model further supposes that employers' preference for employees of certain groups is unrelated to their preference for more productive employees. According to this model, employees that are members of a group that is discriminated against may have to work harder for the same wage or accept a lower wage for the same work as other employees.

Taste-based discrimination can be observed from the side of employers, customers or co-workers. In the case of an employer's "taste for discrimination", the employer aims to avoid non-monetary costs and does so often based on his own preferences. In the case of co-workers and customers, they may not want to interact with people belonging to a certain group, which the employer considers during the hiring process.

== History ==
The taste-based discrimination model was first proposed by Gary Becker in 1957 in his book The economics of discrimination. Becker argued that the reasons for such discrimination should be determined by psychologists and sociologists, not by economists, and he sought only to determine the consequences of discrimination as manifested in economic decision-making. The early version of this model was criticized for failing to explain the continued existence of discriminating firms, because it predicts that these firms will be less profitable than their non-discriminating counterparts. Nevertheless, the taste-based model has since become the predominant economic explanation for discriminatory practices.

== Distinguishing from statistical discrimination ==
It is difficult for economists to distinguish between taste-based and statistical discrimination. A paper in 2008 studied the effect World War I had on German Americans as traders at the New York Stock Exchange. The German Americans were discriminated against as a consequence of the war and were considered an ethnic minority, creating opportunity for taste-based discrimination in the trade market. The results showed that the discrimination indeed had an effect on the German Americans in the NYSE, where the rates of their rejection doubled. However, the discrimination had no effects on the price of NYSE seats.

In 2014, researchers from the Center for Economic and Policy Research conducted a study of the Fantasy Premier League, which is an online game where players choose their 15 players from 20 participant Premier League teams. Since this is a virtual game, the players are able to discriminate without real life consequences. There are no real customers and the "workers" (players) do not interact. This allowed the research team to control for statistical discrimination, because all information about potential employees' productivity is publicly disclosed. The results showed that the research subjects were choosing players based on their performance, which is measured in points, and the race of the players did not play a role. The research was done over a period of three years and no evidence of taste-based discrimination was found.
