= Jonathan Zinman =

American economist

- Born: c. 1971 (age 54–55)

Academic background
- Education: Massachusetts Institute of Technology
- Influences: Jonathan Gruber
- Website: Information at IDEAS / RePEc

Jonathan Zinman (born c. 1971) is a professor of economics at Dartmouth College and a research affiliate at the New Haven-based research outfit Innovations for Poverty Action and the Massachusetts Institute of Technology-based Abdul Latif Jameel Poverty Action Lab. Formerly an economist at the Federal Reserve Bank of New York, Zinman is currently a visiting scholar at the Federal Reserve Bank of Philadelphia and Fellow at the Federal Deposit Insurance Corporation Center for Financial Research. Zinman is also a member of the Behavioral Finance Forum and a Research Advisory Board member of stickK, a web-based start-up that enables users to make commitment contracts in order to reach their personal goals.

== Research ==
Zinman's research focuses on consumer and entrepreneurial choice with respect to financial decisions. Zinman's other research interests include development economics, behavioral economics, household finance and the use of field experiments and randomized controlled trials (RCT) in economics. Zinman recently co-authored a randomized controlled trial study evaluating the impact of microcredit on poor borrowers in the Philippines. His research with stickK Founder and Yale Professor Dean Karlan and World Bank economist Xavier Gine on smoking cessation has shown the effectiveness of commitment contracts for smoking cessation. Zinman's work has received coverage in the following media outlets: The Economist, The New Yorker, The New York Times, and The Wall Street Journal.

== Education ==
Zinman graduated with a Bachelor of Arts degree in government from Harvard University in 1993 and received his Ph.D. in economics from the Massachusetts Institute of Technology in 2002.
