= Statistical discrimination (economics) =

Theorized behavior in economics

Statistical discrimination is a theorized behavior in which group inequality arises when economic agents (consumers, workers, employers, etc.) have imperfect information about individuals they interact with. According to this theory, inequality may exist and persist between demographic groups even when economic agents are rational. This is distinguished from taste-based discrimination which emphasizes the role of prejudice (sexism, racism, etc.) to explain disparities in labour market outcomes between demographic groups.

The theory of statistical discrimination was pioneered by Kenneth Arrow (1973) and Edmund Phelps (1972). The name "statistical discrimination" relates to the way in which employers make employment decisions. Since their information on the applicants' productivity is imperfect, they use statistical information, both current and historical, on the group they belong to in order to infer productivity. If a minority group is less productive initially (due to historic discrimination or having navigated a bad equilibrium), each individual in this group will be assumed to be less productive and discrimination arises. This type of discrimination can result in a self-reinforcing vicious circle over time, as the atypical individuals from the discriminated group are discouraged from participating in the market, or from improving their skills as their (average) return on investment (education etc.) is less than for the non-discriminated group.

A related form of statistical discrimination is based on differences in the signals that applicants send to employers. These signals report the applicant's productivity, but they are noisy. Discrimination can occur if groups differ on means, even if applicants have identical nominal above-average signals: regression to the mean will imply that a member of a higher-mean group will regress less as they are more likely to have a higher true value, while the lower-mean group member will regress more and the signal will overestimate their value if the group membership is ignored ("Kelley's paradox"). Discrimination can also occur on group variances in the signals (i.e. in how noisy the signal is), even assuming equal averages. For variance-based discrimination to occur, the decision maker needs to be risk averse; such a decision maker will prefer the group with the lower variance. Even assuming two theoretically identical groups (in all respects, including average and variance), a risk averse decision maker will prefer the group for which a measurement (signal, test) exists that minimizes the signal error term. For example, assume two individuals, A and B, have theoretically identical test scores well above the average for the entire population, but individual A's estimate is considered more reliable because a large amount of data may be available for their group in comparison to the group of B. Then if two people, one from A and one from B, apply for the same job, A is hired, because it is perceived that their score is a more reliable estimate, so a risk-averse decision maker sees B's score as more likely to be luck. Conversely, if the two groups are below average, B is hired, because group A's negative score is believed to be a better estimate. This generates differences in employment chances, but also in the average wages of different groups - a group with a lower signal precision will be disproportionately employed to lower paying jobs.

It has been suggested that home mortgage lending discrimination against African Americans, which is illegal in the United States, may be partly caused by statistical discrimination.

Market forces are expected to penalize some forms of statistical discrimination; for example, a company capable and willing to test its job applicants on relevant metrics is expected to do better than one that relies only on group averages for employment decisions.

According to a 2020 study, managers who had experience with statistical discrimination theory were more likely to believe in the accuracy of stereotypes, accept stereotyping, and engage in gender discrimination in hiring. When managers were informed of criticisms against statistical discrimination, these effects were reduced.

== See also ==
- Coate-Loury model
