= Postdevelopment theory =

Sociological theory

Postdevelopment theory (also post-development or anti-development or development criticism) is a critique of the concept and practice of modernization and development as promoted by Western political powers in the Third World. Postdevelopment thought arose in the 1990s as a set of criticisms against development projects led by Western nations and legitimized under development theory.

For postdevelopment theorists, "development" is an ideological concept that works to preserve the hegemony of the Global North while increasing the dependency of the Global South. Thus, postdevelopment theory argues for "alternatives to development" or "bottom-up" approaches to development, as determined by the peoples in the Third World.

== Development as ideology ==
The postdevelopment critique holds that modern development theory is a creation of academia in tandem with an underlying political and economic ideology. The academic, political, and economic nature of development means it tends to be policy oriented, problem-driven, and therefore effective only in terms of and in relation to a particular, pre-existing social theory.

The actual development projects thus initiated, by both governments and NGOs, are directed in accordance with this development theory. Development theory itself, however, assumes a framework already set in place by government and political culture in order to implement it. The development process is therefore socially constructed; Western interests are guiding its direction and outcome, and so development itself fundamentally reflects the pattern of Western hegemony.

Development as an ideology and a social vision is ingrained in the ideals of modernization, which holds Western economic structure and society as a universal model for others to follow and emulate. Rooted in Western influence, the developmental discourse reflects the unequal power relations between the West and the rest of the world, whereby the Western knowledge of development, approach toward development, and conception of what development entails, as well as perceptions of progress, directs the course for the rest of the world.

Looking back on the circumstances of this paradigm's creation within the broader context of the material changes accompanying it, the scholar Nick Cullather frames development as "history." He sees it as a perspective on where the world has come from and where the places in it are going—as well as a period in time. He would have it that the concepts of modernization and development fused after 1945. Cullather notes that many historicists who study or promote development construed as history think of the entries in its unfolding through this era in term of a discourse of signifiers. They do this rather than focusing on it as ideology, which to them brings to mind ideas fixed across time. He does, however, point in his research to many scholars who do engage with the idea that it is ideology, such as Michael Latham and Michael Hunt.

== Reviewing development ==
Influenced by Ivan Illich and other critics of colonialism and postcolonialism, a number of postdevelopment theorists like Arturo Escobar and Gustavo Esteva have challenged the very meaning of development. According to them, the way development is understood is rooted in the earlier colonial discourse that depicts the North as "advanced" and "progressive", and the South as "backward", "degenerate" and "primitive".

They point out that a new way of thinking about development began in 1949 with President Harry Truman's declaration: "The old imperialism—exploitation for foreign profit—has no place in our plans. What we envisage is a program of development based on the concepts of democratic fair dealings." While claiming that the "era of development" began at this point, postdevelopment theorists do not suggest that the concept of development was new. What was new was the definition of development in terms of an escape from underdevelopment. Since the latter referred to two-thirds of the world, this meant that most societies were made to see themselves as having fallen into the undignified condition of "underdevelopment", and thus to look outside of their own cultures for salvation.

Development, according to these critics, was now a euphemism for post-war American hegemony; it was the ideals and development programs of the United States and its (Western) European allies that would form the basis of development everywhere else.

== Postdevelopment theory ==
Postdevelopment theory arose in the 1980s and 1990s through the works of scholars like Escobar, Esteva, Majid Rahnema, Wolfgang Sachs, James Ferguson, Serge Latouche, and Gilbert Rist. Leading members of the postdevelopment school argue that development was always unjust, never worked, and at this point has clearly failed. According to Sachs, a leading member of the postdevelopment school, "the idea of development stands like a ruin in the intellectual landscape" and "it is time to dismantle this mental structure."

To cite an example of this "mental structure", development theorists point out how the concept of development has resulted in the hierarchy of developed and underdeveloped nations, where the developed nations are seen as more advanced and superior to the underdeveloped nations that are conceived of as inferior, in need of help from the developed nations, and desiring to be like the developed nations. The postdevelopment school of thought points out that the models of development are often ethnocentric (in this case Eurocentric), universalist, and based on Western models of industrialization that are unsustainable in this world of limited resources and ineffective for their ignorance of the local, cultural and historical contexts of the peoples to which they are applied. In essence, the problem postdevelopment theorists see in development and its practice is an imbalance of influence or domination by the West. Postdevelopment theorists promote more pluralism in ideas about development.

=== Critique of ethnocentrism and universalism ===
Among the starting points and basic assumptions of postdevelopment thought is the idea that a middle-class, Western lifestyle and all that goes with it (which might include the nuclear family, mass consumption, living in suburbia and extensive private space), may neither be a realistic nor a desirable goal for the majority of the world's population. In this sense, development is seen as requiring the loss, or indeed the deliberate extermination (ethnocide) of indigenous culture or other psychologically and environmentally rich and rewarding modes of life. As a result, formerly satisfactory ways of life become dissatisfying because development changes people's perception of themselves.

Rahnema cites Helena Norberg-Hodge "To take an example, Helena Norberg-Hodge mentions how the notion of poverty hardly existed in Ladakh when she visited that country for the first time in 1975. Today she says, it has become part of the language. When visiting an outlying village some eight years ago, Helena asked a young Ladakhi where were the poorest houses. 'We have no poor houses in our village,' was the proud reply. Recently Helena saw the same Ladakhi talking to an American tourist and overheard him say, 'if only you could do something for us, we are so poor.'"

Development is seen as a set of interventions and worldviews which are also powers: to intervene, to transform and to rule. Postdevelopment critiques challenge the notion of a single path to development and demand acknowledgment of diversity of cultural perspectives and priorities.

For example, postdevelopment theorists argue that the politics of defining and satisfying needs is a crucial dimension of development thought, deeply entwined in the concept of agency. Yet, questions of who voices development concerns, what power relations are played out among agents, and how the interests of socially-constructed development experts (e.g., the World Bank, IMF officials) rule the development priorities are not often addressed in classical development thought. The postdevelopment approach attempts to overcome this gap by opening up academic, practical, and other spaces for non-Western peoples and their concerns.

Postdevelopment theory is a critique of the standard assumptions about who possesses the key to progress and how it may be implemented.

=== Alternatives to development ===
While the postdevelopment school provides a plethora of development critiques, it also considers alternative methods for bringing about positive change. The postdevelopment school proposes a particular vision of society removed from the discourse of development, modernity, politics, cultural and economic influences from the West, and market oriented and centralized authoritarian societies.

In his works, Escobar has outlined the common features of postdevelopment thought and societal vision. According to him, the postdevelopment school of thought is interested (in terms of searching for an alternative to development) in "local culture and knowledge; a critical stance toward established scientific discourses; and the defense and promotion of localized, pluralistic grassroots movements". Grassroots movements, Escobar argues, are "local, pluralistic, and distrust organized politics and development establishment".

Postdevelopment thought takes inspiration from vernacular societies, the informal sector and frugal rather than materialistic lifestyles. Furthermore, postdevelopment theorists advocate for structural changes. According to Escobar, postdevelopmental thinking believes that the economy must be based around solidarity and reciprocity; policy must focus on direct democracy; and knowledge systems should be traditional, or at least a hybrid of modern and traditional knowledge. Decolonial programmatics include ALBA: The Bolivarian Alliance for the Peoples of Our America, initiated by Fidel Castro and Hugo Chavez in 2004 in response to neoliberal development projects such as FTAA and NAFTA. ALBA is analyzed and conceptualized using concepts elaborated by decolonial scholars of the Latin American and Caribbean (LAC) region. According to Al-Kassimi, as a decolonial delinking performance, ALBA proposes an alternative to development project that embodies the spirit of Bandung and principles of South-South cooperation thereby contesting the a priori belief that only (Western) knowledge systems informing modernity and civilization lead to economic and social development.

In a recent survey from 2019, Postdevelopment in practice, Elise Klein and Carlos Eduardo Morreo claim that "the practice of postdevelopment is already being carried out by actors in and out of development". In their book, they try to show how "postdevelopment in practice begins with the insistence that an enduring diversity of socialities, a multiplicity of southern knowledges and nature/culture assemblages, and postcolonial political economies reveals already existing alternatives".

=== James Ferguson ===
One of the leading anti-development writers, James Ferguson, contributed to what John Rapley termed "the most important of the opening salvos" of postdevelopment theory with his book The Anti-Politics Machine: Development, Depoliticization, and Bureaucratic Power in Lesotho. In The Anti-Politics Machine Ferguson describes the failure of the development project to properly understand the cultural and economic values of the people of Lesotho. This misunderstanding led to misappropriation of resources by the international community and myriad negative consequences for Basotho (residents of Lesotho), prompting Ferguson to comment that "Capitalist interests [...] can only operate through a set of social and cultural structures so complex that the outcome may be only a baroque and unrecognizable transformation of the original intention." Development projects cannot simply create a desired result, but instead have a number of unexpected consequences.

Ferguson suggests that although development projects often end in failure, they still produce tangible impacts in the physical and social-political environment. In The Anti-Politics Machine, he asks, "What do aid programs do besides fail to help poor people?" In the case of Lesotho, Ferguson proposes that, "while the project did not transform livestock-keeping it did build a road to link to Thaba-Tsea more strongly with the capital." Ferguson argues that there is value to understanding and thinking about the unintended consequences for an environment.

=== Escobar ===
Critics of development do not deny the need for change. They argue instead that to enact proper and effective change, change itself must first be conceived in different terms. Escobar, another leading member of the post development school, argues:

While social change has probably always been part of the human experience, it was only within the European modernity that 'society', i.e. the whole way of life of a people, was open to empirical analysis and made the subject of planned change. And while communities in the Third World may find that there is a need for some sort of organised or directed change—in part to reverse the damage done by development—this undoubtedly will not take the form of 'designing life' or social engineering. In this long run, this means that categories and meanings have to be redefined; through their innovative political practice, new social movements of various kinds are already embarked on this process of redefining the social, and knowledge itself.

=== Rahnema ===
Rahnema addresses the question of which path to take directly in his conclusion to the Post-Development Reader. Rahnema admits that it may be true that a large majority of people, whose lives are in fact difficult, do want change. But the answer he suggests is not development but the "end of development". He says that the end of development is not "An end to the search for new possibilities of change, for a relational world of friendship, or for genuine processes of regeneration able to give birth to new forms of solidarity". Rather, Rahnema argues, the "inhumane and the ultimately destructive approach to change is over. It should resemble a call to the 'good people' everywhere to think and work together."

=== Latouche ===
Latouche is a French emeritus professor in economy at the University of Paris-Sud. A specialist in North-South economic and cultural relations, and in social sciences epistemology, he has developed a critical theory towards economic orthodoxy. He denounces economism, utilitarianism in social sciences, consumer society and the notion of sustainable development. He particularly criticizes the notions of economic efficiency and economic rationalism. He is one of the thinkers and most renowned partisans of the degrowth theory. Latouche has also published in the Revue de Mauss, a French anti-utilitarian journal.

=== Sachs and The Development Dictionary ===
Sachs is a leading writer in postdevelopment thought. Most of his writing is focused on environmentally sustainable development and the idea that past notions of development are naturally unsustainable practices on our finite planet. However, in 1992 he co-authored and edited The Development Dictionary: A Guide to Knowledge as Power which contributed greatly to the compilation of postdevelopment literature as a general theory.

This manifesto posits that the new era of development that emerged in the 1950s was created by the United States in order to secure its new hegemonic position in the global community. Sachs explains that the concept of "underdevelopment" was actually constructed in Harry S. Truman's 1949 inaugural address, which popularized the term. Sachs argues that the creation of this term was a discrete, strategic move to secure American hegemony by reinforcing the idea that the United States is at the top, and other countries on a lower pillar, of a linear and singular trajectory of development. It created a homogeneous identity for these countries and stripped them of their own diverse characteristics. "It converts participation into a manipulative trick to involve people in struggles for getting what the powerful want to impose on them."

The Development Dictionary describes a biological metaphor for development. This biological metaphor was transferred to the social sphere and perpetuated the ideal that there is one natural way to develop into the perfect form. To develop in a manner disparate from the "natural order of things" was to become a disfigured anomaly. This definition held the potential to provide morally ambiguous justification for imperialist behavior and can be connected to colonial discourse and mainstream development theories. Under such categorization, Sachs explains, development was reduced to a simple measurement of the economic growth of per capita production.

Sachs issues a cry for public awareness of the "limits of development". He leaves the reader with the idea of the "New Commons" and posits that men and women should begin with this awareness before attempting to introduce new political policies with room for creativity and innovation in diverse development paths.

== Criticisms ==
There is a large body of works which are critical of postdevelopment theory and its proponents. It has been noted that postdevelopment theory sees all development as imposed upon the developing world by the West. This dualist perspective of development may be unrealistic, and Marc Edelman notes that a large proportion of development has risen from, rather than been imposed upon, the developing world. Citing Jonathan Crush's point that "Development, for all its power to speak and to control the terms of speaking, has never been impervious to challenge and resistance, nor, in response, to reformulation and change." Ray Kiely argues that "The post-development idea is thus part of a long history within the development discourse." In short, Kiely argues that postdevelopment theory is merely the latest version of a set of criticisms that have long been evident within writing and thought in the field of development. Development has always been about choices, Kiely explains. Choices with resulting losers and winners, dilemmas and destruction, as well as creative possibility.

Nevertheless, discussing the project of Postdevelopment in Practice, Kelly Dombrowski notes "that postdevelopment scholars have consistently shown how development's models of progress normalize individuals over collectives and capitalist economies over other forms of economy. They also note how postdevelopment scholars have identified powerful Eurocentric discourses in development that privilege Western expertise and systematically overlook and devalue traditional knowledges and social systems".

Still, critics also argue that postdevelopment perpetuates cultural relativism: the idea that cultural beliefs and practices can be judged only by those who practice them. By accepting all cultural behaviors and beliefs as valid and rejecting a universal standard for living and understanding life, critics of postdevelopment argue, postdevelopment represents the opposite extreme of universalism, extreme relativism. Such a relativist extreme, rather than besting extreme universalism, has equally dangerous implications. John Rapley points out that "rejection of essentialism rests itself on an essentialist claim – namely, that all truth is constructed and arbitrary[...]"

Kiely also argues that by rejecting a top-down, centralized approach to development and promoting development through local means, postdevelopment thought perpetuates neo-liberal ideals. Kiely remarks that "The argument — upheld by dependency and post-development theory — that the First World needs the Third World, and vice versa, rehearses neo-liberal assumptions that the world is an equal playing field in which all nation states have the capacity to compete equally[...]" In other words, making locals responsible for their own predicament, postdevelopment unintentionally agrees with neo-liberalist ideology that favors decentralized projects and ignores the possibility of assisting impoverished demographics, instead making the fallacious assumption that such demographics must succeed on their own initiative alone. Kiely notes that not all grassroots movements are progressive. Postdevelopment is seen to empower anti-modern fundamentalists and traditionalists, who may hold non-progressive and oppressive values.

== Notable development critics ==
- Edward Abbey
- John Africa
- Stafford Beer (viable system model)
- Charles A. Coulombe
- Stanley Diamond
- Jacques Ellul
- Arturo Escobar (anthropologist)
- Gustavo Esteva
- James Ferguson (anthropologist)
- Masanobu Fukuoka
- Mohandas Gandhi
- Edward Goldsmith
- David Graeber
- René Guénon
- Martin Heidegger
- Ivan Illich
- Derrick Jensen
- Theodore Kaczynski
- Ruhollah Khomeini
- Philip Larkin
- Pentti Linkola
- Ned Ludd
- Maria Mies
- MOVE organization
- François Partant
- Fredy Perlman
- Daniel Quinn
- Majid Rahnema
- Gilbert Rist
- Vandana Shiva
- Henry David Thoreau
- John Zerzan

== See also ==
- Alter-globalization
- Anarcho-primitivism
- Critical theory
- Critique of technology
- Deep ecology
- Degrowth
- Eco-anarchism
- Eco-feminism
- High modernism
- Human history
- Industrialization
- Modernization
- Myth of progress
- Neo-Luddism
- Neotribalism
- Paradigm shift
- Principles of intelligent urbanism
- Radical traditionalism
- The Rights of Nature in Ecuador - Sumak Kawsay
- Simple living
- Social criticism

=== Opposing theories ===
- Modernization theory
- Neoliberalism

== Bibliography ==
- Al-Kassimi, Khaled (12 November 2018). "ALBA: A Decolonial Delinking Performance Towards (Western) Modernity – An Alternative to Development Project". Cogent Social Sciences. 4 (1). Informa UK. doi:10.1080/23311886.2018.1546418.
- Bodley, John H. (2008) [1st pub. 1972]. Victims of Progress (5th ed.). Lanham: AltaMira Press. ISBN 978-0-7591-1148-6. OL 16833983M.
- Bunyard, Peter (1984). "Can Self-sufficient Communities Survive the Onslaught of Development?" (PDF). The Ecologist. 14 (1). Cornwall: Edward Goldsmith: 2–5.
- Crush, Jonathan, ed. (1995). Power of Development. London: Routledge. ISBN 978-0-415-11177-5. OL 1114728M.
- Edelman, Marc (1999). Peasants Against Globalization: Rural Social Movements in Costa Rica. Stanford: Stanford University Press. ISBN 978-0-8047-3693-0. OL 7929259M.
- Escobar, Arturo (1995). Encountering Development: The Making and Unmaking of the Third World. Princeton: Princeton University Press. ISBN 978-0-691-00102-9. OL 1096429M.
- Escobar, Arturo (2018). Designs for the Pluriverse: Radical Interdependence, Autonomy, and the Making of Worlds. Duke University Press. doi:10.1215/9780822371816. ISBN 978-0-8223-7181-6. OL 29790732M.
- Ferguson, James (1994). The Anti-Politics Machine: "Development," Depoliticization and Bureaucratic Power in Lesotho. Minneapolis: University of Minnesota Press. ISBN 978-0-521-37382-1. OL 2213259M.
- Gandhi, Mohandas K. (1939) [1st pub. 1938]. Hind Swaraj: or, Indian Home Rule (2nd rev. ed.). Ahmedabad: Navajivan Publishing House. ISBN 978-81-7229-070-2.
- Ginzburg, Oren (2008) [1st pub. 2005]. There You Go! (PDF) (2nd ed.). Hungry Man Books. ISBN 978-0-946592-22-7. OL 32967132M. Archived from the original (PDF) on 21 January 2022.
- Gregory, Derek; Johnston, Ron; Pratt, Geraldine; Watts, Michael; Whatmore, Sarah, eds. (2009). "Post-development". The Dictionary of Human Geography. Hoboken: Wiley-Blackwell. ISBN 978-1-405-13288-6. OL 17103524M.
- Illich, Ivan (1973). Tools for Conviviality. New York, Evanston, San Francisco, London: Harper & Row. ISBN 978-0-06-012138-9. OL 5289380M.
- Kiely, Ray (1994). "Development theory and industrialisation: Beyond the impasse". Journal of Contemporary Asia. 24 (2). Informa UK: 133–160. doi:10.1080/00472339480000101.
- Kiely, Ray (1 June 1999). "The Last Refuge of the Noble Savage? A Critical Assessment of Post-Development Theory". European Journal of Development Research. 11 (1): 30–55. doi:10.1080/09578819908426726. S2CID 143454475.
- Klein, Elise; Morreo, Carlos Eduardo, eds. (2019). Postdevelopment in Practice: Alternatives, Economies, Ontologies. Routledge. ISBN 978-1-138-58867-7. OL 34663311M.
- Latouche, Serge (1993). In the Wake of the Affluent Society: An Exploration of Post-Development. London: Zed Books. ISBN 978-1-85649-171-6. OL 1405704M.
- Norberg-Hodge, Helena (1991). Ancient Futures: Learning from Ladakh. Sierra Club Books. ISBN 978-0-87156-643-0. OL 8348621M.
- Pieterse, Jan Nederveen (25 August 2010). "After Post-Development". Third World Quarterly. 21 (2). Informa UK: 175–191. doi:10.1080/01436590050004300. S2CID 143782668.
- Rahnema, Majid (1997). Rahnema, Majid; Bawtree, Victoria (eds.). The Post-Development Reader. London: Bloomsbury Publishing. ISBN 978-1-85649-473-1. OL 987562M.
- Rapley, John (1 October 2004). "Development Studies and the Post-Development Critique". Progress in Development Studies. 4 (4): 350–354. doi:10.1191/1464993404ps095pr. S2CID 145323059.
- Rist, Gilbert (2003) [1st pub. 1997]. The History of Development: From Western Origins to Global Faith (Expanded ed.). London: Zed Books. ISBN 978-1-84277-180-8. OL 3561498M.
- Sachs, Wolfgang; et al. (1992). Sachs, Wolfgang (ed.). The Development Dictionary: A Guide to Knowledge as Power. London: Bloomsbury Academic. ISBN 978-1-85649-043-6. OL 8996501M.
- Sidaway, James D. (June 2007). "Spaces of Postdevelopment". Progress in Human Geography. 31 (3). Sage Publications: 345–361. doi:10.1177/0309132507077405. S2CID 15793383.
- Thoreau, Henry David (1854). Walden; or, Life in the Woods (1st ed.). Boston: Ticknor and Fields. OCLC 4103827. OL 16793205M.
- Truman, Harry S. (20 January 1949). Four Point Speech (Speech). Presidential inauguration. United States Capitol.
- Ziai, Aram, ed. (2007). Exploring Post-Development: Theory and Practice, Problems and Perspectives. London: Routledge. doi:10.4324/9780203962091. ISBN 978-0-203-96209-1. OL 34587175M.
