= Marglin =

Marglin is a surname. Notable people with the surname include:

- Frédérique Apffel-Marglin, American anthropologist
- Jessica Marglin, American scholar of Jewish Studies
- Stephen Marglin, American economist
