= Development anthropology =

Branch of applied anthropology

Development anthropology refers to the application of anthropological perspectives to the multidisciplinary branch of development studies. It takes international development and international aid as primary objects. In this branch of anthropology, the term development refers to the social action made by different agents (e.g. institutions, businesses, states, or independent volunteers) who are trying to modify the economic, technical, political, or/and social life of a given place in the world, especially in impoverished, formerly colonized regions.

Development anthropologists share a commitment to simultaneously critique and contribute to projects and institutions that create and administer Western projects that seek to improve the economic well-being of the most marginalized, and to eliminate poverty. While some theorists distinguish between the anthropology of development (in which development is the object of study) and development anthropology (as an applied practice), this distinction is increasingly thought of as obsolete. With research on the field, the anthropologist can describe, analyze, and understand the different actions of development that took and take place in a given place. The various impacts on the local population, environment, society, and economy are to be examined.

== History ==
In 1971, Glynn Cochrane proposed development anthropology as a new field for practitioners interested in a career outside academia. Given the growing complexity of development assistance, Cochrane suggested that graduates needed to prepare themselves to work in interdisciplinary settings. In 1973, Cochrane was invited by the World Bank to make recommendations for the use of anthropology, and his report (which stressed the need for the systematic treatment of social issues) laid a foundation for future use of the discipline in the World Bank Group. Around ninety anthropologists are now employed by the World Bank Group in various roles.

In 1974, Bob Berg—of the United States Agency for International Development (USAID)—and Cochrane worked together, and, as a result, USAID introduced "social soundness analysis" as a project preparation requirement. This innovation led to the employment of more than seventy anthropologists. Social soundness analysis has now been in USAID use for over forty years. USAID ran an in-house development studies course in the 1970s, through which several hundred field personnel eventually passed. In addition to anthropology, the course covered development economics, regional and national planning, and institution building.

In the late 1970s, Thayer Scudder, Michael Horowitz, and David Brokensha established an Institute for Development Anthropology at the State University of New York at Binghamton. This institute has played an influential role in the continuing expansion of this branch of the discipline.

By the 1980s and 1990s, development anthropology began to be more widely used in the private sector. Corporate social responsibility and issues ranging from resettlement and human rights to micro-enterprise are now routinely addressed by systematic social assessment as an integral part of investment appraisal.

== Development criticism ==
Criticism of Western development became an important goal in the late 1980s, after the wake of severe economic crisis brought disease, poverty, and starvation to countries and sectors that were the focus of large Western structural adjustment development projects throughout Latin America, Africa, and other parts of the former colonial world. Despite the failure of many of these development projects, and some 40 years of post World War II funding from the US and Europe, scholars know that development has been the key way that Western post-industrialized countries intervene in non-Western society. Development criticism seeks to discover why, given the funds and best intentions of volunteers and policy makers, do the majority of development projects continue to fail to (1) redistribute economic power and resources in a way that helps the poorest sectors of society, and (2) to create economic growth that is sustainable in the country.

Anthropologists who study development projects themselves have criticized the fundamental structure of Western development projects coming from such institutions as USAID and bilateral lenders such as the World Bank. Because they are often working from the perspective of the objects of development in the non-Western world, rather than from within the aid institutions, anthropologists encountering such projects have a unique perspective from which to see the problems. Anthropologists write with concern about the ways that non-Western objects of aid have been left out of the widespread drive to develop after World War II, especially in the ways that such projects limit solutions to poverty in the form of narrow Western capitalist models that promote exploitation and the destruction of household farms, or, more suspiciously, naturalise inequality between Western post-industrialized countries and former colonial subjects.

Some describe the anthropological critique of development as one that pits modernization and an eradication of the indigenous culture, but this is too reductive and not the case with the majority of scholarly work. In fact, most anthropologists who work in impoverished areas desire the same economic relief for the people they study as policymakers; however, they are wary about the assumptions and models on which development interventions are based. Anthropologists and others who critique development projects instead view Western development itself as a product of Western culture that must be refined in order to better help those it claims to aid. The problem therefore is not that of markets driving out culture, but of the fundamental blind-spots of Western developmental culture itself. Criticism often focuses therefore on the cultural bias and blind-spots of Western development institutions, or modernization models that systematically represent non-Western societies as more deficient than the West; erroneously assume that Western modes of production and historical processes are repeatable in all contexts; or that do not take into account hundreds of years of colonial exploitation by the West that has tended to destroy the resources of former colonial society. Most critically, anthropologists argue that sustainable development requires at the very least more involvement of the people who the project aims to target in the project's creation, its management, and its decision-making processes.

A major critique of development from anthropologists came from Arturo Escobar's seminal book Encountering Development, which argued that Western development largely exploited non-Western peoples and enacted an Orientalism (see Edward Said). Escobar even sees international development as a means for the Occident to keep control over the resources of former colonies. Escobar shows that, between 1945 and 1960, the former colonies were going through the decolonization era, and the development plan helped to maintain the third world's dependency on the old metropole. Development projects themselves flourished in the wake of World War II, and during the Cold War, when they were developed to (1) stop the spread of communism with the spread of capitalist markets, and (2) create more prosperity for the West and its products by creating a global consumer demand for finished Western products abroad. Some scholars blame the different agents for having only considered a small aspect of the local people's lives without analyzing broader consequences, while others like dependency theory or Escobar argue that development projects are doomed to failure for the fundamental ways they privilege Western industry and corporations. Escobar's argument echos the earlier work of dependency theory and follows a larger critique more recently posed by Michel Foucault and other post-structuralists.

More recent studies like James Ferguson's The Anti-Politics Machine argue that the ideas and institutional structure that support Western development projects are fundamentally flawed because of the way the West continues to represent the former colonial world. International development uses an "anti-politics" that ultimately produces failure, despite the best intentions. Finally, studies also point out how development efforts often attempt to de-politicize change by a focus on instrumental assistance (like a school building) but not on the objective conditions that led to the development failure (e.g., the state's neglect of rural children at the expense of urban elite), nor the content of what the school might or might not teach. In this sense, the critique of international development focuses on the insidious effects of projects that at the least offer band-aids that address symptoms but not causes, and that at the worst promote projects that systematically redirect economic resources and profit to the West.

== Applied anthropology in development ==
While anthropological studies critique the Western assumptions and political context of development projects, anthropologists also consult on and work within aid institutions in the creation and implementation of development projects. While economists look at aggregate measures like gross national product and per capita income, as well as measures of income distribution and economic inequality in a society, anthropologists can provide a more fine-grained analysis of the qualitative information behind these numbers, such as the nature of the social groups involved and the social significance of the composition of income. Thus, development anthropologists often deal with assessing the important qualitative aspects of development sometimes ignored by an economic approach.

== See also ==
- Cornell-Peru project
- Development aid
- Postcolonialism
