= Gilbert Rist =

Swiss educator (1938–2023)

Gilbert Rist (16 July 1938 – 15 February 2023) was a Swiss professor at the Graduate Institute of International and Development Studies in Geneva and a thought leader of postdevelopment theory. He was best known for his study, The History of Development: From Western Origins to Global Faith, which criticizes development and has been described as “to date, the most consequential and scholarly critique from the left of the development project”. Rist held a PhD from the Graduate Institute of International Studies.

Rist died on 15 February 2023, at the age of 84.

== Writings ==
English

- Gilbert Rist, The History of Development: From Western Origins to Global Faith, Expanded Edition, London: Zed Books, 2003
- Gilbert Rist, The Delusions of Economics: The Misguided Certainties of a Hazardous Science, London: Zed Books, 2011

French (selection)

- (with Marie-Dominique PERROT and Fabrizio SABELLI), La mythologie programmée, L’économie des croyances dans la société moderne, coll. Economie en liberté, PUF, Paris, 1992
- (with Majid Rahnema and Gustavo Esteva), Le Nord perdu, Repères pour l’après-développement, coll. Forum du développement, Editions d’En Bas, Lausanne, 1992
- Le développement, Histoire d'une croyance occidentale, Presses de Sciences Po, Paris, 1996 - also translated into Italian and Spanish
- L'économie ordinaire entre songes et mensonges, Presses de Sciences Po, Paris, 2010

== See also ==
- Development criticism
