= Majid Rahnema =

Iranian diplomat, economist and poverty researcher

Majid Rahnema (1924 – 14 April 2015) was a diplomat and former Minister of Iran, born in Tehran. He represented Iran at the UN from 1957 to 1971. He worked on problems of poverty and production processes of poverty by the market economy.

== Biography ==
He came from the Haeri Mazandarani family. Being an ambassador for a long time, he represented Iran at the UN for twelve successive sessions of 1957 to 1971. He was Commissioner of the United Nations in Rwanda and Burundi in 1959, for elections and the referendum that led these countries to independence. He also served on the University Council of the United Nations from 1974 to 1978, and also resident representative of the United Nations in Mali.

Between 1967 and 1971 he was Minister of Science and Higher Education in Iran under the Shah. In 1971, he created an Institute for Studies of Endogenous Development, inspired by the educational ideas of Paulo Freire, to begin a development project basis with the farmers of Lorestan.

After his retirement in 1985 he taught at the University of California at Berkeley for six years, then, from 1993, to Claremont Pitzer Colleges. He then settled in France, where he taught at the American University of Paris.

His many diplomatic activities in the third world led him to reflect on the development, particularly on poverty. He came to distinguish "poverty" (lifestyle based on moderation, which may be voluntary cf. Voluntary simplicity) from "misery" (lack of access to livelihood). The reflection of twenty years led to the publication of his book When Misery Hunts Poverty (2003). In this book, the author summarized his approach:

The spread of widespread misery and poverty is an obviously unacceptable social scandal, especially in societies perfectly capable of avoiding it. And the visceral rebellion it provokes in us is quite understandable and justified. But it is not by increasing the power of the machine to create goods and hardware products that this scandal will end, because the machine put into operation this effect is the same one that consistently produces misery.

'He is now trying to understand the many reasons and causes of scandal. It is this research that brings me now to show how a radical transformation of our lifestyle, including a reinvention of the chosen poverty, has now become the sine qua non of any serious struggle against new forms of production misery.'

A friend of Ivan Illich, he participated in his reflections on development. He died on 14 April 2015 in Lyon.

== Works ==
- (fr) Apprendre à être, Fayard/Unesco 1972

co-written with Edgar Faure etc.

- (en) Global poverty : a pauperizing myth, Majid Rahnema, Intercultural Institute of Montreal, 1991
- (fr) Le Nord perdu, repères pour l'après développement', Lausanne, éditions d'En-bas 1992

co-written with Gilbert Rist and Gustavo Esteva.

- (en) The Post-Development Reader, compiled and introduced by Majid Rahnema with Victoria Bawtree, Zed Books 1997
- (fr) Quand la misère chasse la pauvreté, Fayard/Actes Sud 2003
- (with Jean Robert ) (fr) La puissance des pauvres, Actes Sud 2008
- Laissez les pauvres tranquilles, Les liens qui libèrent, 2012

== See also ==
- Postdevelopment theory
