= Al-Rafidain University =

University in Iraq

Coordinates: 33°21′51″N 44°24′26″E

Alrafidain University College
- كلية الرافدين الجامعة
- Type: private
- Established: 1988
- Chairman: Dr. Mahmoud Jawad
- Location: Rusafa, Baghdad, Iraq
- Website: https://en.ruc.edu.iq/

Al-Rafidain University is a private academic institution in higher education of public interest established on November 23, 1988. It was founded by The Iraqi Society for Statistical Sciences. The actual work study started in 1988/1989 and is considered one of the oldest private academic colleges in Iraq. The college awards bachelor's degrees in various scientific disciplines and is subject to the laws, regulations, instructions and regulations of the Ministry of Higher Education and Scientific Research through direct scientific and educational supervision on its various activities. Granted by the college recognized by that ministry.

Al-Rafidain University currently includes thirteen medical, engineering and scientific departments. The duration of the study in each stage is four years. The student is awarded a bachelor's degree in engineering and science in his specialization, except for the Department of Dentistry and Pharmacy. The academic system in the college is an annual system consisting of two semesters except for the pharmacy department, which apply the semester system. The certificates granted to the student are approved by the Ministry of Higher Education and Scientific Research and other relevant ministries for the purposes of recruitment and studies. The university has a number of different faculties, including 12 medical labs, 25 engineering and scientific laboratories, as well as 60 classrooms and 40 halls in another building. The college also has artistic, cultural and poetry activities as well as annual scientific conferences and seminars as well as sports activities.

== College Buildings ==
College now has three buildings, the main building located in Palestine St. / Baghdad, which contains the Deanship of the college and some engineering and scientific departments such as communications engineering and computer technology engineering, the second building located in AL- Banook district / Baghdad district which contains other engineering and scientific departments such as cooling and air conditioning engineering, and the building of the dental hospital in Al-Qahira district / Baghdad .

== Faculties ==
The college includes study in:

- Dentistry
- Pharmacy
- Pathology
- Anesthesiology
- Medical Laboratory
- Medical device
- Sonar
- Computer and Communications
- Computer Engineering
- Civil Engineering
- Telecommunications Engineering
- Mechanical Engineering
- Refrigeration and Air Conditioning
- Law
- Business Management
- Computer Science
- Business Administration
- Accounting
- physical education Under development
- Dental Technology Under development
- Medical Physics Under development
- Biology Under development
- SMART Medical Systems Under development

== College Council ==
The College Council (the highest scientific and administrative authority in the college) is formed according to the Iraqi Universities and Colleges Law. It consist of the dean of the college, the members of the heads of scientific departments, the dean's assistant and a representative of the Ministry of Higher Education and Scientific Research who meets the requirements of the college member and one of the specialized experts chosen by the Council The college is for a period of two years and is renewable once and one representative from the institution of the university who meets the requirements of the faculty. The College Council may summon, when necessary, to attend its sessions, the opinion of which is to use its competency and expertise and has no right to vote. The College Council shall undertake the implementation of the college's scientific and educational policy and shall approve the curriculum and vocabulary of the academic subjects and the granting of certificates and degrees according to the laws and regulations in force. It will organize the scientific research and provide its requirements and the use of lecturers from inside and outside the country

== See also ==
- List of universities in Iraq
