= Anti-politics =

Distrust of traditional politics

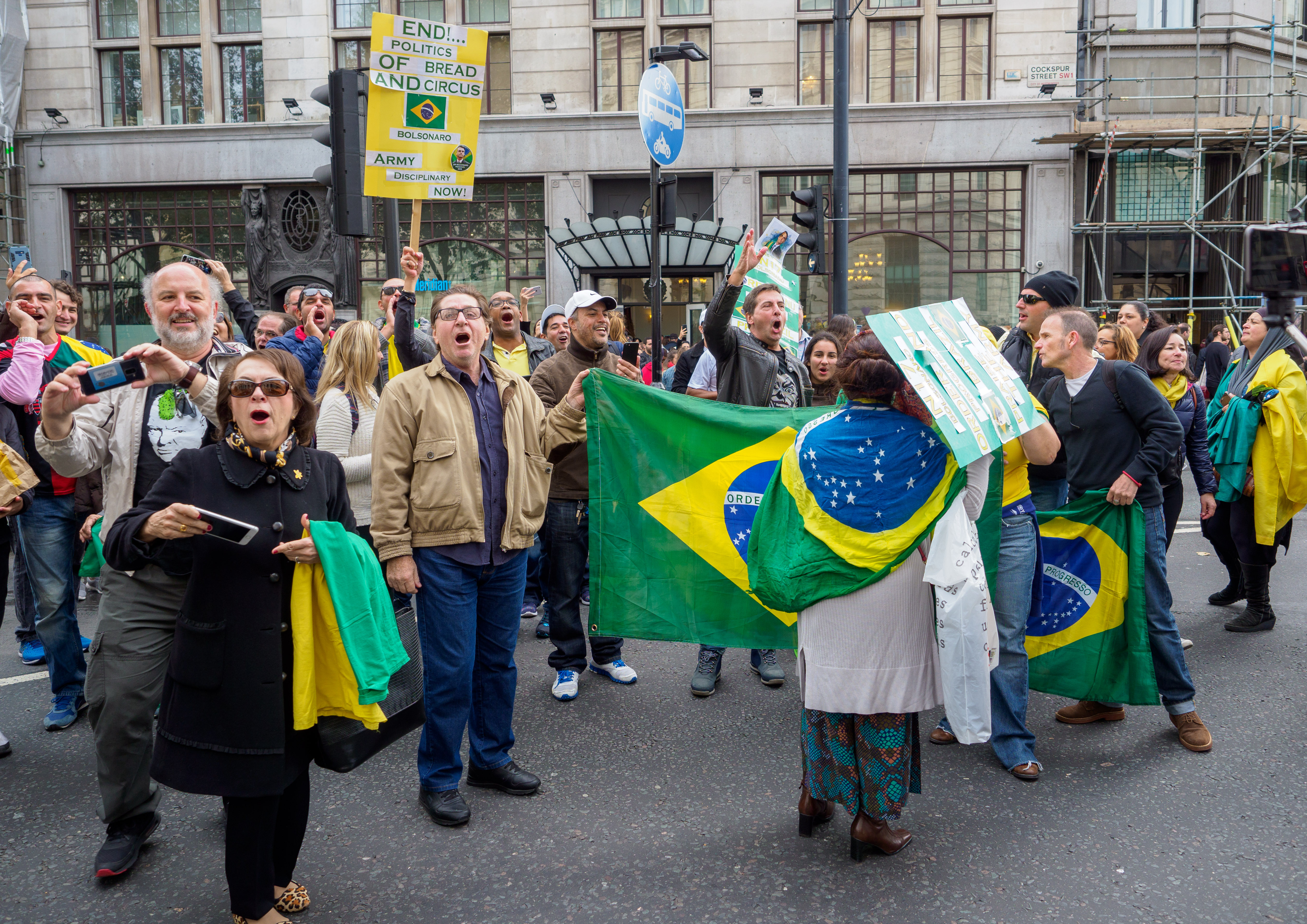
Pro-Jair Bolsonaro protestors hold signs criticising politics.

Anti-politics is a term used to describe opposition to, or distrust in, traditional politics. It is closely connected with anti-establishment sentiment and public disengagement from formal politics. Anti-politics can indicate practices and actors that seek to remove political contestation from the public arena, leading to political apathy among citizens; when used this way the term is similar to depoliticisation. Alternatively, if politics is understood as encompassing all social institutions and power relations, anti-politics can mean political activity stemming from a rejection of "politics as usual".

Anti-politics tends to focus on negative assessments of politicians and political elites by civic organisations, the media and citizens, whereas political apathy may involve disaffection with other elements of a political system, such as the electoral system or party system. Since the 2000s, increasing dissatisfaction with democracy has been a theme of scholarship in both the Americas and Europe, with some political scientists describing high levels of political antipathy as a 'crisis' which risks democratic deconsolidation. Anti-politics has become a key concept in accounts of political dysfunction in liberal democracies, typically dissatisfaction with politics and mistrust of politicians.

Possible causes of anti-political sentiment include the processes associated with depoliticisation, especially an increase in technocratic forms of governance, as well as citizens' perceptions of incompetent governance and the poor performance of politicians. Political distrust can originate from, and increase support for, a range of different political ideologies, including both left-wing and right-wing positions and the extremes of these. Healthy levels of mistrust in politics are often seen as legitimate scepticism and considered beneficial for democratic functioning. High distrust can increase the divide between policy-makers (politicians, or the political establishment) and citizens, which provides opportunities for populist rhetoric. Anti-politics is often expressed through appeals to "the people" and is consequently linked with populism, particularly, but not exclusively, right-wing populism.

== Conceptual history ==
The idea gained attention with the publication of The Anti-Politics Machine by anthropologist James Ferguson in 1990. Ferguson developed a thesis that rural development projects funded by the World Bank and the Canadian International Development Agency in Lesotho increased bureaucratic state power in the country and depoliticised both the state and poverty, causing them to become non-political issues. Ferguson consequently described development as an "anti-politics machine". Ferguson's model has been applied to other developing countries such as India; anti-politics has also been used to critique the shared administration of resources involving Indigenous peoples in Canada and North America.

In the first decade of the 2000s, scholars of human geography such as Andrew Barry drew a distinction between conventional "politics" (the practices and institutions of elections, political parties and governments) and the "political" (scenarios where dissent and debate are permitted), arguing that some forms of politics could be anti-political in that they denied the validity of alternatives. The substitution of public debate with market economics under neoliberalism, or by technocratic managerialism led by experts and scientists, or by the leadership of charismatic figures, are examples of this theory. Barry argued that whereas conventional politics revolved around the framing of issues, a greater focus on economic measurement was causing economics and politics to be conflated. In 2009, Erik Swyngedouw argued these processes had caused Western politics to become "post-political".

Negativity towards formal political institutions is a significant phenomenon in Europe, North America, Australasia and elsewhere. The trend originated in many democracies during the second half of the 20th century and it is generally accepted that a range of factors have contributed to increasing distrust in politics over this broad time frame. In Why We Hate Politics (2007), political scientist Colin Hay wrote that the label "political" had become associated in popular consciousness with negative connotations, such as corruption, greed, self-interest and inefficiency. Hay contrasted this with the positive ideals connected with "democracy". He also analysed a link between anti-political sentiment and political disengagement, including declines in voter turnout, lower membership of political parties and more informal forms of political participation.

== Causes ==
Like other political phenomena, such as populism, political scientists frequently divide the possible causes of anti-politics into demand-side (citizen-based) and supply-side (politics-based) factors. Supply-side explanations include the narrow/exclusionary nature of political elites, the use of political spin, and the purposeful depoliticisation of issues by politicians seeking to lower citizens' expectations and agency. Scholars such as Wendy Brown suggest that neoliberal policies are anti-political as they elevate economics above politics via processes such as deregulation and privatisation, and seek to remove opportunities for valid contestation.

Demand-side explanations include a decline in collective institutions, activists questioning the political order and citizens being attracted to populist leaders. In Bowling Alone (2000), political scientist Robert D. Putnam put forward a demand-side explanation for political disaffection, arguing that the decline in civic participation and increased atomisation of society were responsible for political disengagement in the United States. Political scientists Emma Vines and David Marsh have argued that the distinction between demand- and supply-side explanations is misleading as the growth of anti-politics is related to a dysfunctional relationship between citizens and political authorities, particularly revolving around a lack of dialogue on complex political issues, which are presented as having simple solutions.

Factors causing long-term declines in political trust in democracies
Demand-side (changes in citizens)	Supply-side (changes in politics)	Intermediary (changes in how politics is communicated)
Citizens more affluent and better educated, consequently more critical	Greater expectations on governments, which perform less well against a wider set of criteria	Politics increasingly mediated by journalists and commentators
Weaker alignment between citizens and mainstream political parties	Transfer of power away from national governments to other actors	Media increasingly frames politics in negative terms; growth of social media
Citizens adopting a consumerist approach to politics	Less ideological distinction between different politicians and parties	Political campaigning professionalised; increasingly occurs on the national level and focuses on controlled situations

== Relationship to populism ==
There is a strong link between anti-politics and anti-establishment sentiment. Multiple political theorists have described anti-politics as being a fundamental part of populist ideology. Political scientist Blendi Kajsiu argues that anti-politics can be conceptually distinguished from populism because a rejection of formal politics and politicians can be justified through traditional ideologies such as conservativism (for undermining traditional values) or socialism (for sustaining or increasing inequality), in addition to the "thin ideology" of populism (for violation of the popular will).

In the 2010s, the concept of anti-politics was adopted by political scientists hypothesising links between the presidencies of Donald Trump and Jair Bolsonaro, political events such as Brexit and the growth of far-right politics, and a context of declining trust and participation in representative political systems. In these analyses, anti-politics is often associated with reactionary, nativist, and nationalist movements, which are presented as reactions against the power inequities produced by globalisation and policies such as austerity.

Some scholars have linked anti-vaccine and anti-lockdown protests during the COVID-19 pandemic to the spread of anti-political sentiment, particularly via online social media, in Western democracies.

== See also ==
- Anti-system politics
- Apoliticism – philosophical rejection of political ideology or affiliations
- Depoliticisation – when issues are no longer the subject of political contestation
- Joke candidate
- Political apathy
- Populism – political stances juxtaposing "the people" with "the elite"
- Protest vote
