= Akhil Gupta =

Indian-American anthropologist (born 1959)

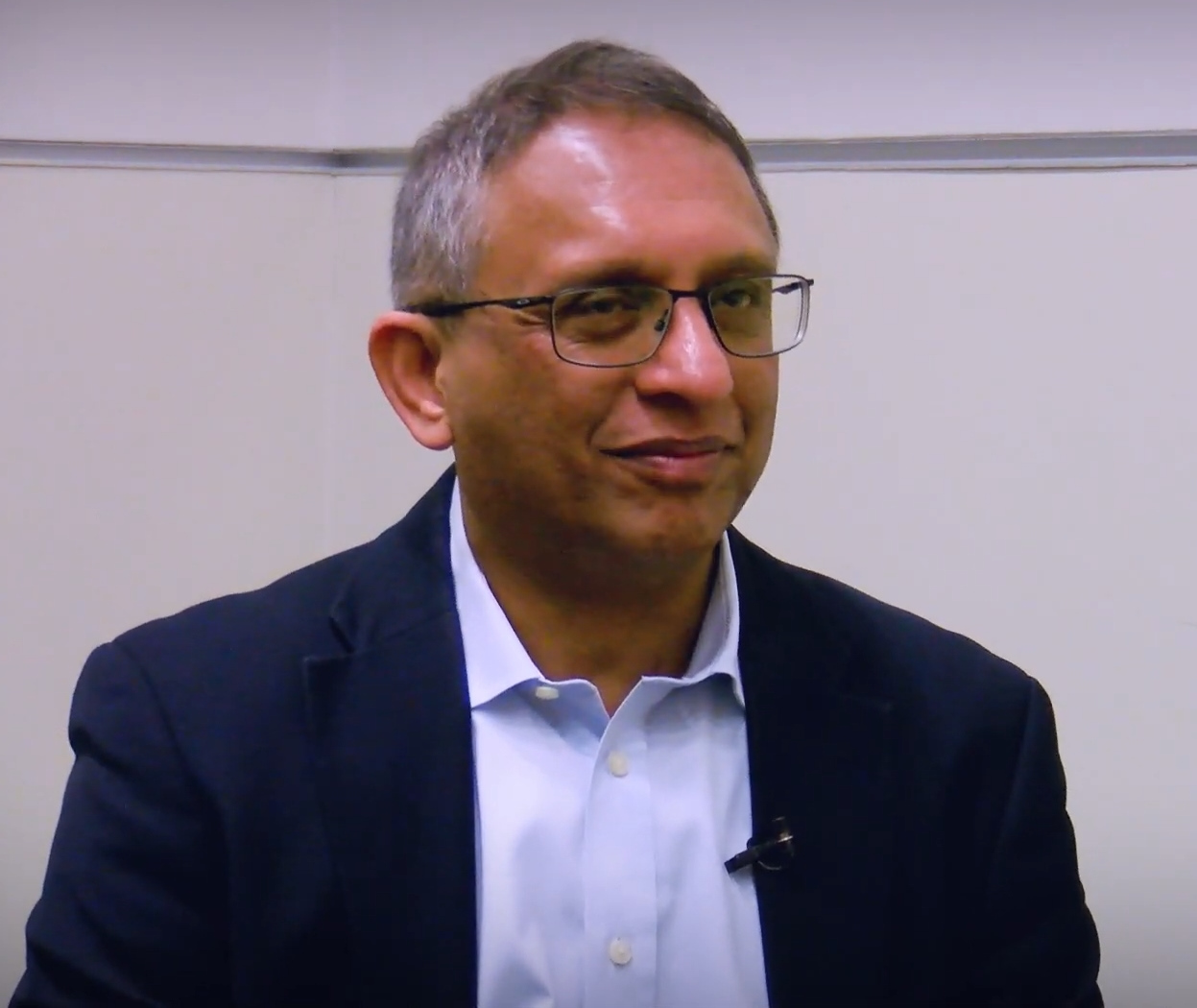
- Gupta in 2020
- Born: 1959 (age 65–66)
- Occupation(s): Anthropologist, professor
- Known for: Professor of Anthropology at the University of California, Los Angeles.
- Spouse: Purnima Mankekar

Akhil Gupta (born 1959) is an Indian-American anthropologist whose research focuses on the anthropology of the state, development, as well as on postcolonialism. He is a professor of anthropology at the University of California, Los Angeles. He is a former president of the American Anthropological Association.

== Education ==
Gupta attended St. Xavier's School in Jaipur and graduated in 1974. Gupta completed his undergraduate studies in Mechanical Engineering from Western Michigan University, followed by a Master's Degree in Mechanical Engineering from the Massachusetts Institute of Technology.

== Career ==
=== Research ===
In 1992, while still at Stanford, Gupta along with fellow Stanford anthropologist James Ferguson wrote the often-cited essay, "Beyond 'Culture': Space, Identity, and the Politics of Difference." which argued that the analytic concept of culture had remained largely unproblematized by anthropological discourse, and that anthropologists of the day had failed to recognize and analyze the politics of cultural difference, how such differences were produced, and how such differences were used and abused by the state and by capital. The article argues for the examination of cultural anthropology as an unconscious mechanism of neo-imperialism.

Gupta is a leading figure in the anthropology of the state, and is the co-editor of a book of collected essays called The Anthropology of the State: A Reader.

=== Tenureship controversy ===
Gupta was unanimously approved for tenure in 1996 at Stanford, but was then denied tenure by Dean John Shoven. Following protests and mobilization by students, the dean's decision was overturned.

== Selected publications ==
- Postcolonial Developments: Agriculture in the Making of Modern India, 1997
- Editor, The Anthropology of the State: A Reader (with Aradhana Sharma), 2006
- Editor, Caste and Outcast (with Gordon Chang and Purnima Mankekar), 2002
- Editor, Culture, Power, Place: Explorations in Critical Anthropology (with James Ferguson), 1997
- Editor, Anthropological Locations: Boundaries and Grounds of a Field Science (with James Ferguson), 1997
