= Cornell-Peru project =

The Cornell-Peru project or the CPP was a development project conducted by anthropology students and professor Allan Holmberg from Cornell University from 1952 to 1966 at the Hacienda in Vicos Mountain in the Andes Highlands that housed members of the indigenous peasant class of Peru. It was one among several applied social science programs focused on agrarian and social reform at Cornell, and an early modernization experiment of the Cold War era. With the help of advisors from the Peruvian government, CPP provided the indigenas at the Hacienda, referred to as Viconsinos, with modernized healthcare, nutrition, education, language, farming techniques and agricultural methods that controversially eliminated their traditional culture.

== Background ==
Social scientists falsely believed that Vicos was culturally isolated, uninfluenced by Western Civilization, and uninvolved with Peru's government and urban Peruvian society. Nonetheless, they believed that the region was vulnerable to communist and socialist political ideologies. Latin America had already faced the Bolivian revolution and the initiation of Árbenz's land reform program in 1952, while the Cuban Revolution began in 1953. While conducting fieldwork about the Sirionó of the Amazon and the people of Virú, Holmberg saw that Vicosinos were subject to cruel treatment and exploitation at the Hacienda. Despite Vicosinos' history of protests against their working condition, Holmberg saw them as being in a "dependent and submissive state" at the Hacienda and in need of rescuing. Holmberg and Cornell crafted their social reform plan to introduce democracy to the region and to be a cheap and viable replacement for a seemingly imminent socialist program.

== Concept and Organization ==
Holmberg, recently hired at Columbia, spoke at the first congress of the Instituto Indigenista Peruano (IIP) in 1951 about his idea of planned social change for the region. Physician and Biologist Carlos Monge Medrano and Minister of Education and Indigenous activist Luis Valcárcel showed support for his plan and later became advisors to the project. Valcárcel got in contact with the country's Minister of Labor and Indigenous Affairs, General Armando Atola, and Chief of Indigenous Affairs in the Ministry of Labor and Indigenous Affairs Dr. Julio Pereya who both approved of the project. Word eventually got out to Peru's then-president Manuel A. Odría who took credit for initiating the collaboration with Cornell in a radio address. The CPP officially got under way in 1952 and began seeking funding.

=== Program Development ===
Holmberg described the methodology of the CPP as "participant intervention" and began with a focus on developing three major areas: "economics and technology, nutrition and health, and education". In 1956, they initiated the plan for the Vicosinos to gain collective ownership of the hacienda. This was one of the goals most advocated for by the Peruvian government. The government made an executive order for the expropriation process to only take two years to the dismay of the CPP, who wanted more time to conduct experiments. This process instead took six years because of complications from the CPP, the gentry, and the beneficiaries who would be relinquishing control of Vicos. Edward Kennedy and the U.S. Embassy in the country were finally able to pressure the transition to happen in July 1962.

== Impact ==
The project achieved small-scale agrarian reform when Vicosinos took collective ownership of the hacienda in 1962. It also helped expand access to education by building a school, and provided housing for teachers.
