= Arturo Escobar (anthropologist) =

Colombian anthropologist

- Born: November 20, 1951 (age 74); Manizales, Colombia

Education
- Education: University of Valle (BS); Cornell University (MA); University of California, Berkeley (PhD)

Philosophical work
- Era: 20th-century philosophy; 21st-century philosophy
- School: Postdevelopment theory; Postcolonialism; Poststructuralism
- Notable ideas: Pluriverse

Arturo Escobar (born November 20, 1951) is a Colombian-American anthropologist and professor emeritus of Anthropology at the University of North Carolina at Chapel Hill, USA. His academic research interests include political ecology, anthropology of development, social movements, anti-globalization movements, political ontology, and postdevelopment theory.

Escobar is a major figure in the post-development academic discourse and has been described as a "post-development thinker to be reckoned with". He has authored influential books criticizing development practices championed by western industrialized societies and exploring possibilities for alternative visions of development, including Encountering Development (1995) and Designs for the Pluriverse (2018).

== Education and career ==
Escobar was born in Manizales, Colombia. He currently holds Colombian and American citizenship and publishes in both English and Spanish.

He received a Bachelor of Science in chemical engineering in 1975 from the University of the Valle in Cali, Colombia, and completed one year of studies in a biochemistry graduate program at the Universidad del Valle Medical School. He subsequently traveled to the United States to earn a master's degree in food science and international nutrition at Cornell University in 1978. After a brief stint in government working in Colombia's Department of National Planning, in Bogotá, from 1981 to 1982, in 1987 he received an interdisciplinary Ph.D. from the University of California, Berkeley, in Development Philosophy, Policy and Planning.

He has taught mainly at U.S. universities, including the University of Massachusetts Amherst, but also abroad at institutions in Colombia, Finland, Spain, and England. He retired as professor of anthropology at the University of North Carolina at Chapel Hill where he taught courses in development theory and social change, often co-teaching with long-time mentee Dr. Michal Osterweil of UNC's Department of Global Studies. He is a member of the editorial advisory board of the Design Research Journal Designabilities. From 2007 to 2008, he served as the Wayne Morse Chair of Law and Politics, established in honor of the late former Senator, at the University of Oregon.

== Scholarship ==
=== Anthropological approach ===
Escobar's approach to anthropology is largely informed by the poststructuralist and postcolonialist traditions and centered around two recent developments: subaltern studies and the idea of a World Anthropologies Network (WAN). His research interests are related to political ecology; the anthropology of development, social movements; Latin American development and politics. Escobar's research uses critical techniques in his provocative analysis of development discourse and practice in general. He also explores possibilities for alternative visions for a postdevelopment era.

=== Criticism of development ===
Escobar contends in his 1995 book, Encountering Development: The Making and Unmaking of the Third World, that international development became a mechanism of control comparable to colonialism or "cultural imperialism that poor countries had little means of declining politely". The book, which won the 1996 Best Book Prize of the New England Council of Latin American Studies, traced the rise and fall of development through Michel Foucault's discourse analysis, which regards development as ontologically cultural (i.e., by examining linguistic structure and meaning). This led him to conclude that "development planning was not only a problem to the extent that it failed; it was a problem even when it succeeded, because it so strongly set the terms for how people in poor countries could live". Citing Foucault marked a shift in the study of development from realism to interpretivist or post-structuralist approaches, which offered much more than an analysis of mainstream development economics or the sprawling array of development actors and institutions it spawned, giving rise to a coordinated and coherent set of interventions that Escobar calls the "development apparatus".

Escobar theorizes that the development era was produced by a discursive construction contained in Harry S. Truman's official representation of his administration's foreign policy. By referring to the three continents of South America, Africa, and Asia as "underdeveloped" and in need of significant change to achieve progress, Truman set in motion a reorganization of bureaucracy around thinking and acting to systematically change the "third world". In addition, he argues that Truman's discursive construction was infused with the imperatives of American social reproduction and imperial pretensions. As a result, the development apparatus functioned to support the consolidation of American hegemony.

Escobar encourages scholars to use ethnographic methods to further the post-development era by advancing the deconstructive creations initiated by contemporary social movements (without claiming universal applicability). Indeed, the Colombia case study in Encountering Development demonstrates that development economists' "economization of food" resulted in ambitious plans but not necessarily less hunger. A new 2011 edition of the book begins with a substantial new introduction, in which he argues that "postdevelopment" needs to be redefined and that a field of "pluriversal studies" would be helpful. He further explored the concept of a pluriverse in his 2018 book Designs for the Pluriverse.

=== Political ecology ===
Escobar received a fellowship from the John Simon Guggenheim Memorial Foundation in 1997 to study "Cultural and Biological Diversity in the Late Twentieth Century". This project culminated in the publication of his book Territories of Difference: Place, Movements, Life, Redes by Duke University Press in 2008, which "analyzes the politics of difference enacted by specific place-based ethnic and environmental movements in the context of neoliberal globalization". It was written after years of fieldwork in Colombia with a group of Afro-Colombian activists of Colombia's Pacific rainforest region called the Proceso de Comunidades Negras (PCN). In 2019 he co-created the Global Tapestry of Alternatives process.

== Bibliography ==
- 2020. Pluriversal Politics: The Real and the Possible. Durham, NC: Duke University Press.
- 2018. Designs for the Pluriverse: Radical Interdependence, Autonomy, and the Making of Worlds. Durham, NC: Duke University Press.
- 2016. Territorios de diferencia. Lugar, movimientos, vida, redes Popayán. Editorial Universidad del Cauca. Colombia, 2016.
- 2016. Autonomía y diseño. La realización de lo comunal Popayán. Editorial Universidad del Cauca. Colombia, 2016.
- 2014. Feel-thinking with the Earth (in Spanish: Sentipensar con la tierra). Medellin, Colombia: Ediciones Unaula, 2014.
- 2012. La invención del desarrollo Popayán. Editorial Universidad del Cauca. Colombia, 2012.
- co-edited with Walter Mignolo. 2010. Globalization and the Decolonial Option London: Routledge.
- 2008. Territories of Difference: Place, Movements, Life, Redes. Durham, NC: Duke University Press.
- Co-edited with Gustavo Lins Ribeiro. 2006. World Anthropologies: Disciplinary Transformations in Contexts of Power. Oxford: Berg.
- Escobar, A. and Harcourt, W. (eds) 2005 Women and the Politics of Place. Bloomfield, CT: Kumarian Press.
- Co-edited with Jai Sen, Anita Anand, and Peter Waterman. 2004. The World Social Forum: Challenging Empires. Delhi: Viveka. German edition: Eine andere Welt Das Weltsozialfoum. Berlin: Karl Dietz Verlag, 2004.
- Co-edited with Sonia Alvarez and Evelina Dagnino 2000. Cultures of Politics/Politics of Cultures: Revisioning Latin American Social Movements. Boulder: Westview Press. (Also published in Portuguese and Spanish). Portuguese edition: Cultura e Política nos Movimentos Sociais Latino-Americanos. Belo Horizonte: Editoria UFMG, 2000.
- 1995. Encountering Development: The Making and Unmaking of the Third World (1995). Princeton: Princeton University Press. Best Book Award, New England Council of Latin American Studies, 1996. (In Spanish)1998. La invención del tercer mundo: Construcción y Deconstrucción del Desarrollo. Bogotá [Colombia]: Norma.
- Co-edited with Sonia Alvarez. 1992. The Making of Social Movements in Latin America: Identity, Strategy, and Democracy. Boulder: Westview Press.

== See also ==
- Alter-globalization
- Decoloniality
- Degrowth
- New materialism
- Development anthropology
- Development criticism
- Postdevelopment theory
