= Designs for the Pluriverse =

2018 book by Arturo Escobar

Designs for the Pluriverse: Radical Interdependence, Autonomy, and the Making of Worlds
- Author: Arturo Escobar
- Language: English
- Subject: Design theory and development studies
- Publisher: Duke University Press
- Publication date: 2018
- Publication place: United States
- Media type: Print and e-book
- Pages: 312
- ISBN: 978-0-8223-7105-2
- OCLC: 983824383

Designs for the Pluriverse: Radical Interdependence, Autonomy, and the Making of Worlds is a 2018 book by the Colombian-American anthropologist Arturo Escobar on design theory. It is a revised English translation of the author's 2016 book Autonomía y diseño: La realización de lo comunal, which was published in Spanish with a Creative Commons license. The title of the English book refers to a pluriverse or a 'multiplicity of worlds' where different forms of life and knowing exist. It has been described both as a call-for-action book and a how-to manual. Designs for the Pluriverse is currently required reading in some development studies programs. Before the book's publication in 2018, an unpublished manuscript was shared among anthropologists and design researchers.

In the book, Escobar criticizes capitalism, colonialism, and patriarchy and proposes such approaches as 'design for transitions' and 'autonomous design' to address some of the challenges facing humanity and bring about cultural, economic, and political transformation. Escobar uses the examples of indigenous and Afro-descended people in Latin America to illustrate his arguments. The book draws on the works of such authors as Ivan Illich, Tony Fry, Humberto Maturana, Francisco Varela, and Thomas Berry, among others.

== Structure ==
Designs for the Pluriverse is divided into three sections, each of which explores a different aspect of the pluriverse. The first section contains a summary of the design research literature and social theory approaches to design. The second section offers a critique of Cartesian rationalism and dualisms such as mind-body and argues for developing a more relational pluriverse. Finally, the third section explores the implications of the pluriverse for design and offers application of the concepts explored in the previous chapters.

== Reception ==
The book was praised for bringing together diverse concepts and perspectives. Some critics argued that the book would become a 'classic' in design anthropology and development studies. However, it was criticized for being hard to read and its excessive use of jargon, which was claimed to render it inaccessible to designers and development practitioners who could have most benefited from it. It was also criticized for raising more questions rather than providing answers and for romanticizing indigenous cultures.
