= Jessica Marglin =

American historian of religion

Jessica Maya Marglin is an American historian of religion. She is the Jacob E. Safra Professor of Jewish History and Sephardic Civilization in the Department of Near Eastern Languages and Civilizations at Harvard University, and was previously an associate professor of religion at University of Southern California (USC) and served as USC's Ruth Ziegler Early Career Chair in Jewish Studies from 2016 to 2019. She is the author of Across Legal Lines: Jews and Muslims in Modern Morocco, which won the 2016 Baron Book prize, awarded by the American Academy for Jewish Research for best first book in Judaic studies.

== Early life and education ==
Marglin is the daughter of Smith College anthropologist Frédérique Apffel-Marglin and Harvard economist Stephen A. Marglin. She earned her undergraduate degree from Harvard College in 2006 as well as a master's degree in Middle Eastern studies. From 2006 to 2007, she was a Fulbright Fellow studying the history of Jews in North Africa at Hebrew University of Jerusalem. She earned her doctorate in Near Eastern studies at Princeton University.

== Works ==
- Across Legal Lines: Jews and Muslims in Modern Morocco (Yale University Press, 2016)
- The Shamama Case: Contesting Citizenship across the Modern Mediterranean (Princeton University Press, 2022)

== Awards ==
- 2016: Baron Book Prize from the American Academy for Jewish Research for Across Legal Lines
- 2017: National Jewish Book Award in the Sephardic Culture category for Across Legal Lines
- 2017: Norris & Carol Hundley Award by the Pacific Coast Branch of the American Historical Association for Across Legal Lines
- 2023: Albert Hourani Book Prize by the Middle East Studies Association for The Shamama Case
- 2023: J. Willard Hurst Prize by the Law and Society Association for The Shamama Case
- 2023: Mediterranean Seminar Best Book Prize for The Shamama Case
