= Gustavo Esteva =

Mexican activist (1936–2022)

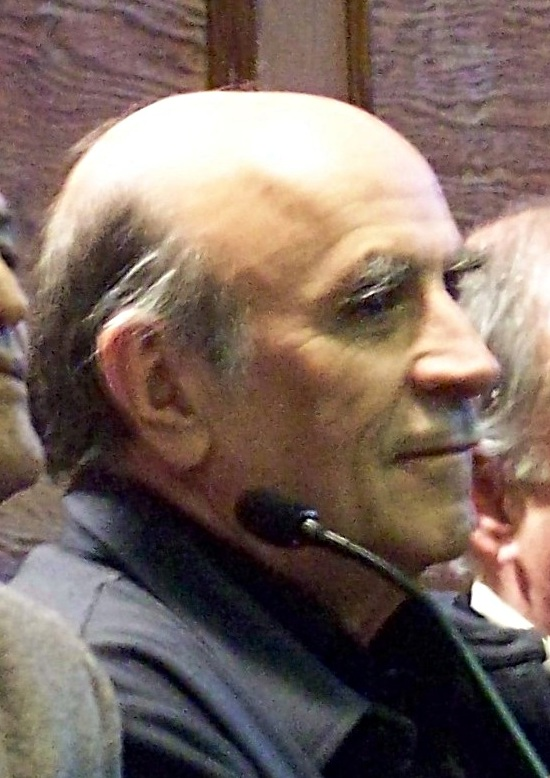
Gustavo Esteva, in 2008

Gustavo Esteva (20 August 1936 – 17 March 2022) was a Mexican activist, "deprofessionalized intellectual", and founder of the Centro de Encuentros y Diálogos Interculturales and the Universidad de la Tierra in the Mexican city of Oaxaca. He was one of the best-known advocates of the sociological theory of post-development.

== Life and career ==
Esteva was born in Mexico City on 20 August 1936, as the third child of Elodia Figueroa and Guillermo A. Esteva, a politician, writer and professor. Esteva's father died early in his life.

At 15, I was forced to support an extended family of siblings, aunts and cousins, becoming first an office-boy in a bank; and, then, thanks to Truman's Development, the youngest executive ever for IBM. Thanks to the Development experts and their Education projects for underdeveloped Mexicans, I had arrived!!! With my newly minted education credit hours, I could be at the very center of the Development Epic: providing good services to the community, good conditions for the workers and good profits to the stakeholders; while of course, gaining a solid income, prestige and a sports car.

Part of my function, as personnel manager, was to contribute to a process of indoctrination that forged loyalty of the workers to the company. The workers had to submit to that ideological straitjacket, according to which to struggle for the good of the company meant to struggle for one's own interests.

Esteva worked for different companies. "Despite the personal discomfort brought about by an increasing awareness of the fraud of the original promise of my profession, I advanced rapidly in my career." Finally he turned to the public sector, where he worked for the Bank of foreign trade and joined a Marxist group with revolutionary aspirations, which he quit in 1965.

When I accepted an important position in government, I did not do it with the idea of making the revolution from within government, or to promote relevant social change. I needed a salary and I sought refuge in my work, while I was still trying to achieve some clarity within me and about what to do. In the following years, while I worked in the office of the President in charge of planning the public budget, I dedicated a good part of my free time, many hours and days of work, to the writing of my first book: Economy and Alienation. I would close myself in my room, separating the intellectual activity from the rest of the things I was doing. It is perhaps the only one of my texts to which I seriously dedicated a prolonged effort of research and reflection. It is a book which I still value and which contains arguments and reflective analysis which I still support. It allowed me to formulate a conception of the world and an attitude towards change that does not require violence.

From 1970 to 1976, he was a high-ranking official in the government of President Echeverría.

When he gave up this job, he was totally disillusioned about statist development practices.

Even the best development programs, like those I was conceiving and implementing, were totally counterproductive: damaging to their supposed beneficiaries.

A long session with [the next president][...]López Portillo and his top advisors two weeks before he took office removed any doubts for me as to the path I should take. In that session the President announced unequivocally that his policies would be adverse to the peasants. Five days after this session I initiated the first of two non profit organizations, entering thus the world of civil society in which I have been working since then.

In 1983 he met Ivan Illich: "[...] I was invited to a Seminar in Mexico City on the social construction of energy with Wolfgang Sachs. Ivan was there. I was mesmerized. That very night, I embarked on my Illich studium. A little later, I started to collaborate with him. Still later, slowly, we became friends."

Esteva was an advisor with the Zapatista Army for National Liberation (EZLN) in Chiapas for the negotiations with the government. He worked at the Centre for Intercultural Dialogues and Exchanges (CEDI) in the city of Oaxaca, published regularly in different journals, and worked with Indian groups and non-governmental organizations (NGOs). In 2019, he co-created the Global Tapestry of Alternatives process.

Esteva died in Oaxaca on 17 March 2022, aged 85.

== Thinking ==
Esteva had a Catholic upbringing. During his studies at the Universidad Iberoamericana, Gustavo approached a Jesuit philosopher and asked him if it was possible to rationally prove the existence of god. After many readings and meetings with the philosopher, he arrived at the conclusion that it was not possible. When he lost his faith in God, he replaced it with a faith in reason. Through his studies, he became familiar with instrumental rationality; dissatisfied, he turned, after some soul searching, to Marxism.

During the 70s, Esteva,

[...] took part in a very intense debate regarding the peasants. The debate took place throughout Latin America and especially in Mexico, which partially were resonating to a world debate. The topic of this debate allowed me to advance a radical critique of Marxism's well-known position on the peasants. I was classified as a 'campesinista' in contrast to various other intellectual positions, in a debate basically celebrated within the Marxist framework. Even though I continued, for a long time, to consider myself a Marxist, little by little I abandoned Marxism as a doctrine and as a political and ideological orientation. [...] In that process, through which I came closer and closer in contact with the concrete activities of peasants, I was able to question the categories of all the disciplines in which I had been educated or which I had learned on my own. I began to formulate a radical critique of development. This change in my thinking could be clearly seen in the name of an umbrella organization, Analysis, Development and Gestión, created in 1979 to coordinate the actions of many other NGOs we had constituted in that period.

[...]

I suspect that the most important rupture in my life occurred when I began to remember my experiences with my grandmother as a child. She could not come to our house in Mexico City through the front door because she was an Indian. She was not allowed by my mother to talk to us in Zapotec or tell us stories about her community. My mother assumed that the best she could do for her children was to radically uproot them from their Indian ancestry. But I adored my grandmother and during holidays asked to be sent with her, to Oaxaca. Remembering my grandmother, remembering what she taught me in spite of the restrictions imposed by my mother –something I had in the back of my mind through my previous journey-, re-membered me with the people at the grassroots. I described this experience in a text written in 1986 and which I still consider an important guiding text, "Regenerating People's Space." In this text I alluded to the new questions that I began to ask myself in that time, and also some of the ways in which I began to confront them. My theoretical work on people of the margins, which was abundant in those years, very clearly shows a new path which was consolidated and affirmed when I met Ivan Illich in 1983.

The rupture with previous ways of thinking and acting is clearly evident in the 80s. What I did and what I wrote clearly illustrates it. I still, however, found myself, especially in the sphere of ideas, rooted in the Western horizon of intelligibility. Only after moving to live in the Zapotec village of San Pablo Etla, in Oaxaca, in 1989, and after my involvement with the Zapatistas starting in 1994, was I able to abandon that horizon and seriously entertain the possibility that a new horizon had appeared for me, even though I was still not able to fully articulate it.

With Marxism, Esteva had given up all ideas about a vanguard. He was an advocate of radical pluralism.

Discussing the national identity, Esteva referred to Guillermo Bonfil's distinction between a profound (México profundo) and an imaginary Mexico (México imaginario). He questioned the modern obsession with planning the future and "projects" of all kinds:

The national project has been based entirely on proposals put forth by imaginary Mexico. [...] A project implies projecting oneself into the future. Modern humans want to construct the world according to the image they have of themselves, their representation of the world, as opposed to accepting that they are constructed in the image and semblance of God or by tradition (Villoro, 1992). They need a project. The Mexican elite inherited and accepted this compulsion, but it did not attempt to invent its own project: instead it relied on the Western model, which it believed to be universal. All that was necessary was to impose it, with the adaptations that each generation considered appropriate.

The contrasting attitude of the Indigenous peoples, according to Esteva, is not to reject social change:

[...] one of their best traditions, which explains that historical continuity, is that of transforming tradition in a traditional way. They know that they cannot exist without a vision of the future, but they do not pretend to control that future: instead of the arrogant expectations of modern man, based on the assumption that the future is programmable, they maintain hopes, well aware that these may be fulfilled or not: they nourish them to keep them alive but without holding onto them. They have not been able to avoid the experience of modernity, but they have not become rooted in it.

Traditionally, the indigenous people did not oppose their own project to the dominant project—but times have changed:

Today, however, two factors are for the first time driving the people of deep Mexico to articulate their own project: the urgency of confronting the latest version of the dominant project, in which there is no dignified space for them, with a unified vision that expresses the diversity of their own ideas and interests and the fact that this latest dominant project has aggravated the historical conflict between Mexicans to the point that it has depleted the original justification for nationhood -- indeed, were it to continue it would divide Mexican society in a way that would be unsustainable.

== Selected works ==
=== Books ===
- David Barkin, Gustavo Esteva: Inflación y Democracia : El Caso de México, México : Siglo XXI, 1979
- Gustavo Esteva: Economía y enajenación (Economy and alienation), México, D.F. : Biblioteca Universidad Veracruzana, 1980
- Gustavo Esteva: La batalla en el México rural, México : Siglo XXI, 1982
- James E. Austin and Gustavo Esteva (ed.): Food Policy in Mexico : The Search for Self-Sufficiency, Ithaca; London : Cornell Univ. Pr., 1987
- Gustavo Esteva: Fiesta - jenseits von Entwicklung, Hilfe und Politik, Frankfurt a. M. : Brandes & Apsel, 1992 – German translation of a selection of essays, enlarged second edition in 1995
- Gustavo Esteva: Crónica del fin de una era : el secreto del EZLN, México : Ed. Posada, 1994
- Gustavo Esteva Figueroa and Madhu Suri Prakash: Hope at the margins : Beyond human rights and development, New York : St. Martin's Press, 1997
- Madhu Suri Prakash and Gustavo Esteva: Escaping education : Living as learning within grassroots cultures, New York [etc.]: Peter Lang, 1998
- Gustavo Esteva and Madhu Suri Prakash: Grassroots post-modernism : Remaking the soil of cultures, London & New Jersey: Zed Books, 1998
- Gustavo Esteva, and Catherine Marielle (eds.): Sin maíz no hay país: páginas de una exposición, México : Consejo Nacional para la Cultura y las Artes, Dirección General de Culturas Populares e Indígenas, 2003
- Gustavo Esteva, Salvatore Babones, and Philipp Babcicky: The future of development : a radical manifesto, Bristol: Policy Press, 2013
- Gustavo Esteva, a cura di, Ripensare il mondo con Ivan Illich, Riola (Bo), Mutus Liber, 2014
- Gustavo Esteva, Nuovi ambiti di comunità Per una riflessione sui 'beni comuni', Collana Voci da Abya Yala, Documenti dall'America latina, a cura del gruppo Camminardomandando, Edizioni Mutus Liber, 2016
- Gustavo Esteva, Gustavo Esteva: A Critique of Development and Other Essays, Routledge, 2022

=== Book Chapters ===
- Esteva, Gustavo. (1971). "El Mito de La Planeación Económica Mexicana." (The Myth of Mexican Economic Planning), in Cuestiones Económicas Nacionales, ed. Banco Nacional de Comercio Exterior. México: Banco Nacional de Comercio Exterior
- Esteva, Gustavo. (1974). "Autosuficiencia y Reorganización de La Producción, Claves de La Estrategia Agropecuaria Tomo I." (Self-sufficiency and Reorganization of Production, Keys to Agropecuary Strategy Tome I), in Memoria Del Primer Congreso Nacional de Economistas, ed. Colegio Nacional de Economistas. México: Colegio Nacional de Economistas
- Esteva, Gustavo. (1980). "La economía campesina actual como opción de desarrollo, una noción, un proyecto de investigación y un programa de acción de desarrollo" (Current Peasant Economy as a Development Option, A Notion, a Research Project and a Development Action Plan), México: Ensayos COPIDER
- Esteva, Gustavo. (1984). "Capacitación para el desarrollo vernáculo y ciudadanía" (Training for Vernacular Development and Citizens), in Centro de Investigación para el Desarrollo Rural Integral (Ed.), La capacitación en el medio rural, México: CIDERI
- Esteva, Gustavo. (1986). "En la hora del encuentro" (The Hour of the Encounter), in: Adolfo Aguilar Zinzer, Cesáreo Morales y Rodolfo Peña (Eds.), Aún tiembla. Sociedad política y cambio social: el terremoto del 19 septiembre de 1985. México, Grijalbo
- Esteva, Gustavo. (1987). "Development as a threat: the struggle for rural Mexico," in Teodor Shanin (Ed.), Peasants and peasant societies. Oxford: Basil Blackwell
- Esteva, Gustavo. (1987). "Regenerating people´s space", in Saúl H. Mendlovitz (Ed.), Towards a just world peace. Londres: Butterworths
- Esteva, Gustavo. (1989)."Alternatives to Economics", in Macroeconomics 89´90. Connecticut: The Dushkin Publishing Group
- Esteva, Gustavo: "Development" in The Development Dictionary. A Guide to Knowledge as Power, London & New Jersey: Zed Books, 1992, pp. 6–25
- Esteva, Gustavo. (1993). "On Behalf of People's Dignity: An Argument for Resisting the Idea of Being Developed", in Camilla Nielsen, Oliver Rathcolb (Eds.), From Cancún to Vienna. International Development in a New World. Viena: The Bruno Kreisky Forum for International Dialogue
- Esteva, Gustavo. (1996). "Hosting the otherness of the other", S. Marglin and Frederique Apfel-Marglin, (Eds.), in Decolonizing Knowledge: From Development to Dialogue. Clarendon: Oxford University Press
- Esteva, Gustavo. (1997). "From Global Thinking to Local Thinking" (with Madhu S. Prakash) and "Basta! Mexican Indians Say 'Enough'", Majid Rahnema, with Victoria Bawtree, The Post-Development Reader. London: Zed Books
- Esteva, Gustavo. (2009). "Volver a la mesa" (Returning to the Table), in Pratec, Soberanía alimentaria y cultura de la comida en la América profunda, Lima: Pratec
- Esteva, Gustavo. (1998). "The Revolution of the New Commons", C. Cook and J.D.Lindau (Eds.), in Aboriginal Rights and Self.Government. Montreal: McGill-Queen's University Press
- Esteva, Gustavo. (2001). "Mexico: Creating Your Own Path at the Grassroots", in V. Benntholdt-Thomsen, N. Faraclas and C. Von Werlhof (Eds.), There Is an Alternative: Subsistence and Worldwide Resistance to Corporate Globalization. Victoria: Spinifiex Press/Londres y Nueva York: Zed Books
- Esteva, Gustavo; Stuchul, D.; Prakash, M.K; Shiksha; V. (2002). "From a Pedagogy for Liberation to Liberation from Pedagogy.", in Unfolding Learning Societies: Experiencing the Possibilities. Udaipur, Rajasthan, India: Shikshantar, The Peoples' Institute for Rethinking Education and Development
- Esteva, Gustavo. (2004). "Un mundo de muchos mundos" (A World of Many Worlds), with Martina Kaller. "Eine dialogische Perspektive auf die mexikanische Agrargeschichte.", in Wolfgang Dietrich/Stefanie Reinberg (Hrs.), Lateinamerika und Europa: Auf dem Weg zu einem gemeinsamen Bildungs . und Kulturraum? Frankfurt: Brandes and Apsel/Sudwind
- Esteva, Gustavo. (2005). "Universidad de la Tierra: The freedom to learn", "Development – Walking Beyond: From promotion to Co-motion", "Learning from Literacy Campaigns: An Intercultural approach to Orality", "Cultural regeneration, instead of Education" and "Time for celebration.", in S. Pimparé and C. Salzano (Eds.), Emerging and re-emerging leaning communities: Old wisdoms and new initiatives from around the world. Paris: UNESCO
- Esteva, Gustavo. (2008). "The Other Campaign, APPO and the Left.", in Diana Denham & C.A.S.A. Collective, Teaching Rebellion: Stories from the Grassroots Mobilization in Oaxaca. Oakland: PM Press
- Esteva, Gustavo. (2010). "Beyond education", Lois Meyer & Benjamín Maldonado Alvarado (Eds.), in New World of Indigenous Resistance: Noam Chomsky and Voices from North, South and Central America. San Francisco: City Lights Books
- Esteva, Gustavo. (2018). "Friendship, Hope and Surprise.", in V. Brunetta and K. O'Shea (Eds.), Durty Words, Limmerick, Ireland: Durty Words Publishing House
- Esteva, Gustavo. (2019). "El camino hacia el diálogo de vivires." (The Path Towards the Dialogue of Vivires), in Stefano Sartorello (Coord.), Diálogo y conflict interepistèmicos en la construcción de una casa común, Mexico: Universidad Iberoamericana
- Esteva, Gustavo. (2019). "Caminos de autonomía bajo la tormenta" (Pathways to Autonomy through the Storm), in G. Makaran, P. López and J. Wahren (Coords.), Vuelta a la autonomía, Mexico: Bajo Tierra Ediciones/Editorial El Colectivo/UNAM/CEALC
- Esteva, Gustavo. (2019)."Postdevelopment @25: on being 'stuck' and moving forward. Sideways, backward and otherwise.", in E. Klein and C.E. Morreo, Postdevelopment in Practice: Alternatives, Economies, Ontologies, London & New York: Routledge
- Esteva, Gustavo. (2020). "Repensar El Carácter Del Régimen Dominante" (Rethinking the Character of the Dominant Regime), in Raúl Ornelas and Daniel Inclán (eds.), Cuál Es El Futuro Del Capitalismo, Ciudad de México: UNAM, 69–104
- Esteva, Gustavo. (2020). "El día después" (The Day After), in Segato, R.S; Krenak, A.; Escobar, A.; Esteva, G.; Hackeo Cultural; Toro Pérez, C.; Leff, E.; De Sousa Santos, B.; Zibechi, R.; Claivjo Gallego, T.; Mignolo, W.; Torrez, Y.F.; Reichmann, J.; Adrían Almazán and 300 more; Angulo Jara, C.; Cisneros Ordoñez, W.A.; Dagua Mosquera, A.L.; Hernández Romero, R.; Niebles Guitiérrez, G.A.; Yarza de los Ríos, V.A.; Albán Achinte, A.; Prometeo, Pandemia al Sur. Prometeo

=== Articles ===
- Esteva, Gustavo. (1991). "Development: the modernization of poverty", Panoscope, 27, 28 November
- Esteva, Gustavo: "Tepito: No Thanks, First World", in In Context, num. 30, Fall/Winter 1991
- Esteva, Gustavo and Prakash, M.S. (1992). "Grassroots Resistance to Sustainable Development: Lessons from the Banks of the Narmada", in The Ecologist, Vol. 22, No. 2, March/April, pp. 45–51. See also Lokayan Bulletin, Summer 1992
- Esteva, Gustavo: "Re-embedding Food in Agriculture", in Culture and Agriculture (Virginia, USA), 48, Winter 1994
- Esteva, Gustavo: "From 'Global Thinking' to 'Local Thinking': Reasons to Go beyond Globalization towards Localization", with M.S.Prakash, in Osterreichische Zeitschirift für Politikwissenschatft, 2, 1995
- Esteva, Gustavo: "Hosting the Otherness of the Green Revolution", in Frédérique Apffel-Marglin and Stephen A. Marglin, eds. of Decolonizing Knowledge: From Development to Dialogue, Oxford: Clarendon Press, 1996, pp. 249–278
- Esteva, Gustavo: "Beyond Development, What?", with M.S. Prakash, in Development in Practice, Vol. 8, No.3, August 1998
- Esteva, Gustavo: "The Zapatistas and People's Power", in Capital & Class, 68, Summer 1999
- Esteva, Gustavo: "The meaning and scope of the struggle for autonomy", in Lat. Am. Perspect., 28:2, March 2001, pp. 120–148
- Esteva, Gustavo. (2004a): "Back from the future" – Notes for the presentation in "Schooling and Education: A Symposium with Friends of Ivan Illich", organized by TALC New Vision, Milwaukee, October 9, 2004 online
- Esteva, Gustavo. (2004b): "Rupturas:", Turning Points online
- Esteva, Gustavo. (2007). "The Asamblea Popular de los Pueblos de Oaxaca: A Chronicle of Radical Democracy", in Latin American Perspectives, Issue 152, January 2007
- Esteva, Gustavo. (2007). Oaxaca: The Path to Radical Democracy. Socialism and Democracy, Vol.21, July 2007, pp. 74–96.
- Esteva, Gustavo: "The Oaxaca commune and Mexico's autonomous movement's", Oaxaca de Juárez, Oaxaca, México : Ed. ¡Basta!, 2008, 22 p.
- Esteva, Gustavo. (2012). "Pensar todo de nuevo: anticapitalismos sin socialismo. Una conversación con Teodor Shanin", in Bajo el volcán, 11, 18, marzo-agosto
- Esteva, Gustavo. (2015). "Pensar desde el abismo", in La Voz de la Tribu, No. 2: 23-29
- Esteva, Gustavo. (2015). "The Hour of Autonomy", in Latin American and Caribbean Ethnic Studies, Vol. 10, No. 1: 134-145

== See also ==
- Development criticism

== Secondary literature ==
- Terán, Gustavo: Conversations with Mexican nomadic storyteller, Gustavo Esteva : learning from lives on the margins, Dissertation, University of Vermont, 2002.
- Aram Ziai: "Gustavo Esteva (born 1936). Selbstbestimmte Gemeinwesen statt Entwicklung" in: eins. Entwicklungspolitik. Information Nord Süd, No. 23/24, 2005, 48-50
- González Gómez, Elías; Tornel, Carlos. Gustavo Esteva: Vida y obra de un intelectual público desprofesionalizado (Gustavo Esteva: Life and Work of a Public Deprofessionalized Intellectual), México: Bajo Tierra A.C./Heinrich Böll Foundation, 2023
