= Underdevelopment =

Concept in international economics, associated with lesser well-being

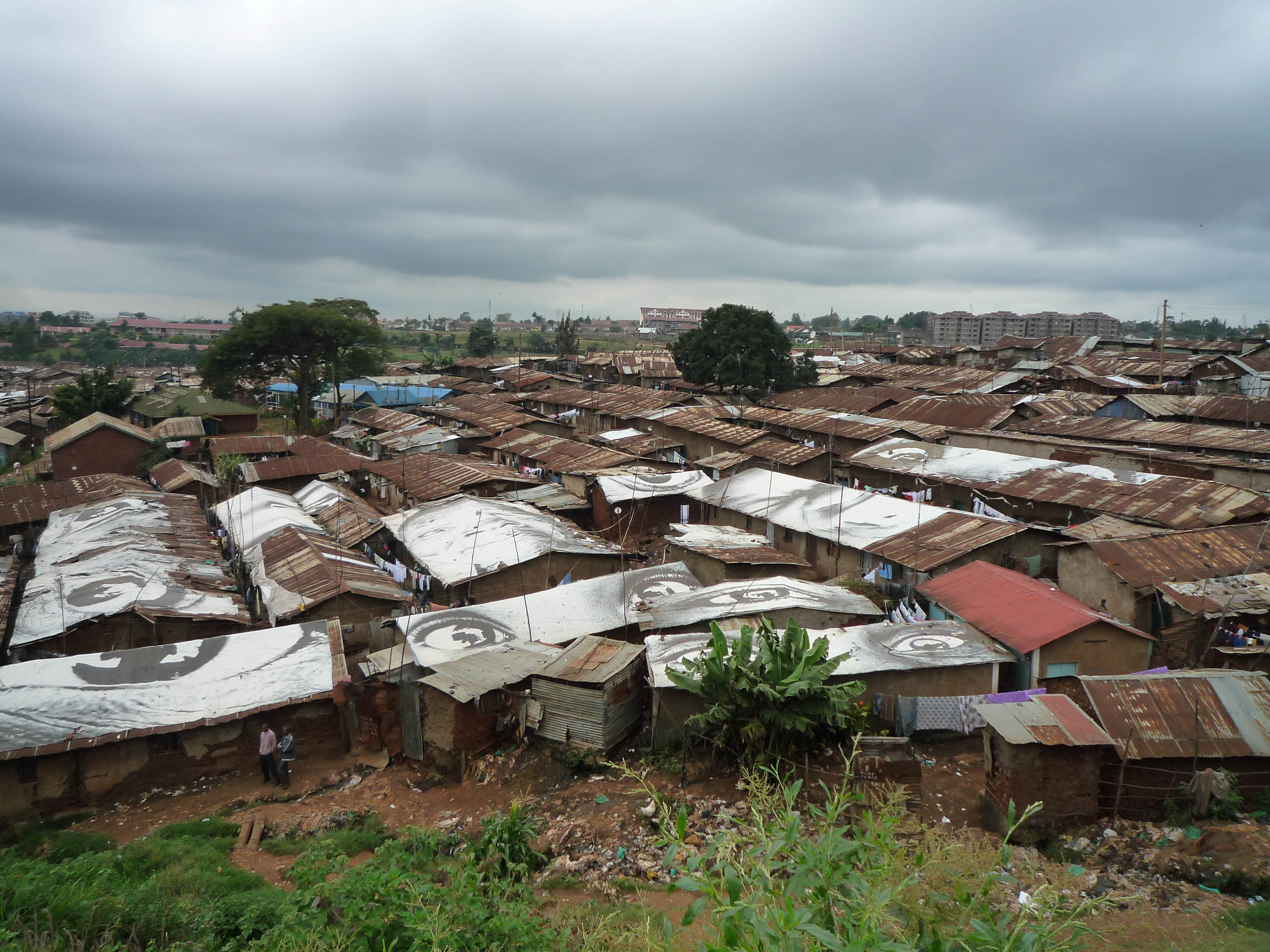
Slum in Kibera, Kenya (2010)

Underdevelopment, in the context of international development, reflects a broad condition or phenomena defined and critiqued by theorists in fields such as economics, development studies, and postcolonial studies. Used primarily to distinguish states along benchmarks concerning human development—such as macro-economic growth, health, education, and standards of living—an "underdeveloped" state is framed as the antithesis of a "developed", modern, or industrialized state. Popularized, dominant images of underdeveloped states include those that have less stable economies, less democratic political regimes, greater poverty, malnutrition, and poorer public health and education systems.

Underdevelopment per Walter Rodney is primarily made of two components, a comparative aspect as well the relationship of exploitation: namely, the exploitation of one country by another.

== History ==
In critical development and postcolonial studies, the concepts of "development", "developed", and "underdevelopment" are often thought of to have origins in two periods: first, the colonial era, where colonial powers extracted labor and natural resources, and second (most often) in referring development as the postwar project of intervention on the so-called Third World. Mexican activist Gustavo Esteva asserted that underdevelopment began when American president Harry Truman delivered his inaugural address in 1949 since, after the second world war, poverty on a mass scale was suddenly "discovered" in these underdeveloped regions of the world. Esteva stated: "On that day two billion people became underdeveloped." More than half of the world's nations were categorized by what they lacked. The Euro-centric development discourse and its aura of expertise often conflated development with economic growth. When the world began to categorize nations based on their economic status, it narrowed the issue of underdevelopment to an economics problem. As a result, the solutions brought forth by development experts and practitioners were squarely economic—failing to address the profound political and social contexts such as colonial legacies and Cold War geopolitics.

=== The Green Revolution ===
The Green Revolution is a paradigm of a concerted effort of intervention in the name of global development. During this time, developed countries, in an attempt to modernize the global agricultural sector, sought to export the industrial agricultural model of production. At the start of the Green Revolution, the U.S., Canada, and other advanced European countries were giving their surplus crops to poorer countries in the form of food aid in order to mitigate widespread hunger that parts of the postcolonial world was then witnessing. Crops that weren't previously prevalent across the globe, such as wheat, were being transferred and from the global north to south in massive quantities. This occurred until developing countries, such as India, became heavily dependent on the food aid—much of which were crops that could not be grown locally. In order for dependent countries to keep receiving foreign assistance, the U.S. made it conditional for recipients of food-aid to adopt the whole industrial model of agriculture.

The revolution was titled "Green" not just because of its connections to agriculture but also was used as a tool to fight the "Red", or communist revolution. The West believed that hunger had the power to drive people to peasant revolutions, so food aid was used explicitly to fight the spread communism. While efforts were made to increase food security in poor nations by helping them move to being self-sufficient, the industrial model of agriculture that was exported to recipient countries had a complex system of necessary inputs. In order for yields to actually increase, farmers needed fertilizers, pesticides, and new irrigation systems, a costly chain of requirements that cut profits for the farmers even when their yields rose. The countries that were dependent on food aid now became dependent on the transnational corporations that provided agricultural inputs that the industrial model required. The Green Revolution was able to increase crop yields (at least in the short term, before land was degraded by the increased need for fertilizers and pesticides), but in the process it exacerbated vulnerable populations' poverty in countries that are now considered underdeveloped.

== Theories and explanations ==
Several theories and types of explanation have been offered to explain why some countries have been underdeveloped and/or how their development may occur.

=== Geographical explanations ===
Seminal economist Adam Smith surmised not only that a nation's prosperity depends on free markets, but also that coastal geography - easy access to sea trade - plays an important part. Compared with Europe, large proportions of Africa, Asia and the Americas are far from the ocean. Jeffrey Sachs and his collaborators have demonstrated this relationship of geography with underdevelopment more systematically, pointing out that this relationship is also mediated by factors of agricultural productivity and disease prevalence.

Jared Diamond has proposed that continental alignment also played a part: the east–west alignment of Europe-Asia allowed diffusion of useful agricultural species, while the north–south alignments of the Americas and Africa inhibited such diffusion.

=== Modernization theory ===
One of the first major theories to surface as a solution to this new issue of “underdevelopment” was the modernization theory. This highlights the positive role played by Western countries in modernizing and facilitating development in the non-West. It is often contrasted with dependency theory.

The theory of modernization consists of three parts:

- A hierarchical identification of nations or societies, and explanation of how those designated as "modernized" or relatively modernized differ from others
- Specification of how societies become modernized, comparing factors that are more or less conducive to transformation
- Generalizations about how the parts of a modernized society fit together, involving stages of modernization and ideal types of successfully modernized countries

In the mid-20th century, the world leaders that had emerged from the Second World War saw the former colonies as areas that needed increasing amounts of intervention because their populations were the subjects of much suffering. It became a moral imperative for developed nations, primarily the U.S., to offer assistance so that these countries could industrialize the way the countries of the first world had. The modernization theory, growing out of U.S. scholarship, equated modernization with industrialization, development, and progress.

One of the most notable contributors to the theory was Walt Whitman Rostow who developed an economic model which outlined five stages of growth for nations to follow in his essay, “The Stages of Economic Growth: A Non-Communist Manifesto”.

Rostow's Five Stages:

1. The Traditional Society
2. The Preconditions for take-off
3. The Take-off
4. The Drive to Maturity
5. The Age of High Mass Consumption

These stages present a linear trajectory of development in a which the traditional society, exhibiting feudal and “backward” characteristics, can transform into a modern society with advanced industries and urban societies. By placing national growth on a linear path to modernization and hails industrialization as the key to development, Rostow's model simplifies complex inequality between nations by claiming that (since various nations began the process of development at different time periods) different societies are simply at different stages of growth. Rostow's model makes the assumption that the inequality between states will eventually disappear once each progresses on the timeline of modernity—sped up, he argued, through contact with modernized cultures and their modern economic and political models.

=== Dependency theory ===
Dependency theory reflects the body of mid-20th century theories by various intellectuals, both from the Third World and the First World, that suggest that the wealthy nations of the world need a subjugated peripheral group of poorer states in order to remain wealthy. Dependency theory states that the poverty of the countries in the periphery is not because they are not integrated into the world system, but because of how they are integrated into the system.

These poor nations provide natural resources, cheap labor, and consumer markets for the wealthy nations, without which, according to dependency theorists, they could not have the standard of living they enjoy. First world nations actively, but not necessarily consciously, perpetuate a state of dependency through various policies and initiatives. This state of dependency is multifaceted, involving economics, media control, politics, banking and finance, education, sport and all aspects of human resource development. Any attempt by the dependent nations to resist the influences of dependency could result in economic sanctions and/or military invasion and control. This is rare, however, and dependency is enforced far more by the wealthy nations setting the rules of international trade and commerce.

Dependency theory first emerged in the 1950s, advocated by Raul Prebisch whose research found that the wealth of poor nations tended to decrease when the wealth of rich nations increased. The theory quickly divided into diverse schools. Some, most notably Andre Gunder Frank and Walter Rodney adapted it to Marxism. "Standard" dependency theory differs sharply from Marxism, however, arguing against internationalism and any hope of progress in less developed nations towards industrialization and a liberating revolution. Former Brazilian President Fernando Henrique Cardoso wrote extensively on dependency theory while in political exile. The American sociologist Immanuel Wallerstein refined the Marxist aspect of the theory, and called it the "world system." World system theory adds another layer to what dependency theorists describe as the structure of the world: the semi-periphery. The semi-periphery is composed of countries such as Brazil and South Africa that can't simply be categorized as part of the core or the periphery (i.e. they have developed urban areas but also large areas of rural poverty). World systems theory also states that the dynamic of surplus extraction that occurs between nations also occurs within them, between their elite and poor classes. According to this structure, which includes a core, a periphery, and a semi-periphery, not every nation can develop simultaneously (which directly challenges the linear model of modernization which suggests that all countries are on the trajectory of development). WST instead argues that development and underdevelopment are created simultaneously.

According to Brazilian social scientist, Theotonio Dos Santos, dependence means a situation in which certain countries economies' are conditioned by the development and expansion of another to which the former is subject. He goes on to further clarify that the interdependence of two or more economies, and consequently world trade, assumes the form of dependence when dominant countries can create dependency only as a reflection of that expansion, which can have a negative effect on the subordinate's immediate economy.

Guyanese Marxist historian and political activist and one of the leading theorists on underdevelopment Walter Rodney contends in reference to Africa's underdevelopment, "The decisiveness of the short period of colonialism and its negative consequences for Africa spring mainly from the fact that Africa lost power. Power is the ultimate determinant in human society, being basic to the relations within any group and between groups. It implies the ability to defend one's interests and if necessary to impose one's will by any means available. In relations between peoples, the question of power determines maneuverability in bargaining, the extent to which a people survive as a physical and cultural entity. When one society finds itself forced to relinquish power entirely to another society, that in itself is a form of underdevelopment".

Rodney also elaborates on his broader theory of underdevelopment and the issues of using the term especially in reference to comparing economies, saying "Actually, if 'underdevelopment' were related to anything other than comparing economies, then the most underdeveloped country in the world would be the U.S.A, which practices external oppression on a massive scale, while internally there is a blend of exploitation, brutality, and psychiatric disorder."

== See also ==
- Development economics
- Development theory
- Economic development
- Developed country
- Developing country
