= Stephen Marglin =

American economist

Stephen A. Marglin
- Born: California, United States

Academic background
- Education: Harvard
- Influences: Karl Marx; John Maynard Keynes; Friedrich Hayek
- Website: https://scholar.harvard.edu/marglin

Stephen Alan Marglin is an American economist. He is the Walter S. Barker Professor of Economics at Harvard University, a fellow of the Econometric Society, and a founding member of the World Economics Association.

== Background ==
Marglin grew up in a moderately left-wing Jewish family and attended Hollywood High School in Los Angeles before moving to Harvard for his university studies in 1955. He earned membership into Phi Beta Kappa, and graduated summa cum laude (1959). He was subsequently honored with a Harvard Junior Fellowship (1960–63), and was later a Guggenheim fellow.

== Career ==
Marglin started out as a neoclassical economist, and was regarded, even while still an undergraduate, as the star of Harvard's economics department. Arthur Maass, the Frank G. Thomson Professor of Government, emeritus, at Harvard, once remembered how Marglin, "when he was just a senior, wrote two of the best chapters in a book published by a team of graduate students and professors." His exceptional early contributions to neoclassical theory led to his becoming a tenured professor at Harvard in 1968, one of the youngest in the history of the university.

Since the late 1960s, Marglin, following the lead of people such as Samuel Bowles, Herbert Gintis, and Arthur MacEwan, rejected orthodox economics and began expressing dissenting views in his own academic work. According to his former teacher, James Duesenberry, Marglin's career subsequently "suffered" because of his department and the university authorities in general taking a negative view of this change. Economist Brad DeLong noted in a similar vein that the wider community of "Ivy League economists" took a rather dim view of Marglin's post-tenure "deviancy", something that has "not been pretty" to observe.

Marglin has published in areas including the foundations of cost–benefit analysis, the workings of the labor-surplus economy, the organization of production, the relationship between the growth of income and its distribution, and the process of macroeconomic adjustment.

He wrote the widely discussed 1971-1974 paper "What do bosses do?", first published in France by his friend André Gorz, followed by a series of others, in which he argued that

the most important innovation of the Industrial Revolution was not technological, but organizational: the linear hierarchy (master–journeyman–apprentice) typical of crafts in the premodern era was replaced by the pyramidal hierarchy (boss–foreman–worker) of the modern, capitalist enterprise. How did this happen? What hold did the capitalist have on the worker that permitted this new form of organization to thrive and eventually to dominate?

The conventional answer is superior efficiency, a better mousetrap. If the capitalist enterprise comes into existence because of its superior efficiency, then the boss can entice the worker by offering him more money than the worker could earn on his own. [...] By contrast, the answer in "Bosses" is that the capitalist organization of work came into existence not because of superior efficiency but in consequence of the rent-seeking activities of the capitalist.

Elsewhere, Marglin argued: "The obstacles to liberating the workplace lie not only in the dominance of classes in whose interest it is to perpetuate the authoritarian workplace, but also in the dominance of the knowledge system that legitimizes the authority of the boss. In this perspective, to liberate the workplace it is hardly sufficient to overthrow capitalism. The commissar turned out to be an even more formidable obstacle to workers' control than the capitalist."

His highly cited and influential work "What do bosses do?" came as part of Marglin's disagreement with fellow Harvard professor David Landes over aspects of the Industrial Revolution; years later, Landes wrote "What do bosses really do?" in reply.

Marglin is critical of those who explicitly set out to deny the normative aspect of economics—something that he believes "really started with the British economist Lionel Robbins"—arguing that opposing ideology is "a methodological error [...] What is ideology, after all, but the unproved assumptions, beliefs, and values that must underlie any intellectual inquiry, or for that matter, any form of contemplation or action? [...] As long as we deny the ideological component of our theories, we shall never transcend it."

Marglin's 21st-century research has included analysis of the foundational assumptions of economics, concentrating on whether they represent universal human values or merely "reflect western culture and history." The Dismal Science (2008) looks at, amongst other things, the manner in which community is steadily gutted as human relations are replaced with market transactions.

Marglin's most recent book is Raising Keynes: A Twenty-First-Century General Theory (2021). The book rescues the central insight of John Maynard Keynes' great work, The General Theory of Employment, Interest and Money, that capitalism left to its own devices has no mechanism for guaranteeing full employment, and that consequently the government must provide a visible hand to work in tandem with the invisible hand of the market. "Rescues" because the mainstream view today is unchanged from the 1930s when Keynes wrote the General Theory: namely, that the problem is imperfections that impede the working of markets, warts on the body of capitalism rather than the body itself. Over the years the radical, heterodox Keynes was transformed by the mainstream into a super-sophisticated theorist of warts, specifically, a theorist of how capitalism can get stuck if wages are insufficiently flexible. The wart theory allowed economists to accept some of Keynes's policy insights, in particular the limitations of monetary policy and the necessity for countercyclical fiscal policy in extremis, while rejecting the idea that there is any more serious flaw than the warts themselves. And, supremely important, restricting the role of government to alleviating the warts is a strictly short-term, limited endeavor.

Raising Keynes shows how and why the orthodox reading of Keynes is wrong and substantiates Keynes's insight that, even if you strip capitalism of its warts, you still have a system that has no mechanism for reliably producing enough jobs. The state is needed not on an occasional, intermittent basis, but continually, in the long run as well as in emergencies.

In line with his view of economics teaching as "extremely narrow and restrictive," for some years Marglin offered an alternative to Greg Mankiw's course in introductory economics.

== Partial publications list ==
=== Books ===
- Raising Keynes: A Twenty-First-Century General Theory. Cambridge, MA: Harvard University Press. 2021.
- The Dismal Science: How Thinking Like an Economist Undermines Community. Cambridge, MA: Harvard University Press. 2008.
- Decolonizing Knowledge: From Development to Dialogue. Oxford: Clarendon Press. 1996. (Co-editor with Frédérique Apffel-Marglin).
- Dominating Knowledge: Development, Culture, and Resistance. Oxford: Clarendon Press. 1990b. (Co-editor with Apffel-Marglin).
- The Golden Age of Capitalism: Reinterpreting the Postwar Experience. Oxford: Clarendon Press. 1990a. (Co-editor with Juliet Schor).
- Growth, Distribution, and Prices. Cambridge, MA: Harvard University Press. 1984a. ISBN 9780674364158.
- Value and Price in the Labour-Surplus Economy. Oxford: Clarendon Press. 1976. ISBN 978-0-19-828194-8.

=== Articles, papers, and chapters ===
- "La Science Economique: Une Science Lugubre?" (PDF). In Jean-Pierre Potier, ed., Les Marmites De L'histoire: Melanges En L'honneur De Pierre Dockes, pp. 25–38. Paris: Classiques Garnier. 2014.
- Marglin, Stephen A. (2013). "Premises for a New Economy". Development. 56 (2): 149–154. doi:10.1057/dev.2013.20. S2CID 84461684.
- "Where Did All the Money Go? Stimulus in Fact and Fantasy" (PDF). INET Research Note #031. 2013. Archived from the original (PDF) on 2013-11-13. (With Peter M. Spiegler).
- "We Have to Wake up and Smell the Flowers". European Journal of Economics and Economic Policies: Intervention. 8 (2): 237–245. 2011. doi:10.4337/ejeep.2011.02.01. hdl:10419/277217.
- Pattanaik, Prasanta K.; Cullenberg, Stephen, eds. (2004), "Individualism and Scarcity", Globalization, culture, and the limits of the market: essays in economics and philosophy, Themes in Economics, New Delhi New York: Oxford University Press, ISBN 978-0-195-66446-1
- "Development as Poison: Rethinking the Western Model of Modernity" (PDF). Harvard International Review. 25 (1): 70–75. 2003.
- Economic Myths. Séminaire Hétérodoxies du Matisse. Pantheon-Sorbonne University. 2002.
- Marglin, Stephen A. (2000). Keynes Without Nominal Rigidities (Report). Harvard Institute of Economic Research Paper No. 1907. doi:10.2139/ssrn.250790. S2CID 152307514.
- "Understanding Capitalism: Control vs. Efficiency". In B. Gustaffsson, ed., Power and Economic Institutions: Reinterpretations in Economic History. Aldershot: Edward Elgar. 1991.
- Bhaduri, Amit; Marglin, Stephen (1990). "Unemployment and the real wage: the economic basis for contesting political ideologies" (PDF). Cambridge Journal of Economics. 14 (4): 375–393. doi:10.1093/oxfordjournals.cje.a035141. (With Amit Bhaduri).
- Marglin, Stephen A. (1990). "Sustainable Development: A Systems of Knowledge Approach". The Black Scholar. 21 (1): 35–42. doi:10.1080/00064246.1990.11412956. JSTOR 41067671.
- "Knowledge and Power". In F. Stephen, ed., Firms, Organization and Labour. London: Macmillan. 1984.
- "Catching Flies with Honey: An Inquiry into Management Initiatives to Humanize Work". Economic Analysis and Workers' Management. 13 (4): 473–487. 1979.
- Marglin, Stephen A. (1975). "What Do Bosses Do? Part II". Review of Radical Political Economics. 7 (1): 20–37. doi:10.1177/048661347500700102. S2CID 153539367.
- Marglin, Stephen A. (1974). "What Do Bosses Do?". Review of Radical Political Economics. 6 (2): 60–112. doi:10.1177/048661347400600206. S2CID 153641564.
- "Origines et fonction de la parcellisation des tâches. À quoi servent les patrons?", in André Gorz (ed.), Critique de la division du travail, Paris, Seuil, 1973, p. 41-89.
- Marglin, Stephen A. (1970). "Investment and Interest: A Reformulation and Extension of Keynesian Theory". The Economic Journal. 80 (320): 910–931. doi:10.2307/2229905. JSTOR 2229905.
- Marglin, Stephen A. (1963). "The Opportunity Costs of Public Investment". The Quarterly Journal of Economics. 77 (2): 274–289. doi:10.2307/1884403. hdl:10.2307/1884403. JSTOR 1884403.
- Marglin, Stephen A. (1963). "The Social Rate of Discount and The Optimal Rate of Investment". The Quarterly Journal of Economics. 77 (1): 95–111. doi:10.2307/1879374. JSTOR 1879374.

== Political and other views ==
A liberal in his earlier years, since the mid-1960s Marglin has been a Leftist, and has even been labelled a Marxist, though he describes himself as Marxist "only in the sense of not being anti-Marx." He identifies as a cultural Jew and a secular humanist, and maintains his practice of Judaism for the sense of community it provides.

Marglin was arrested in 1972 while demonstrating against the Vietnam War. He supported the Occupy movement, and contributed to a teach-in at Occupy Harvard.

== Personal life ==
Marglin is married to Christine Marglin (née Benvenuto). She is the author of Shiksa: The Gentile Woman in the Jewish World and Sex Changes: A Memoir of Marriage, Gender, and Moving On. Marglin's previous two marriages, to Carol Kurson (died 2020) and Frederique Apffel-Marglin, ended in divorce. From youngest to oldest, his children (including stepchildren) are Nasia Benvenuto-Ladin, 2021 high-school grad; Yael Benvenuto-Ladin, rising college senior; Gabriel Benvenuto-Ladin, working in theater production; Jessica Marglin, associate professor of Jewish Studies and religion, law, and history; Elizabeth Marglin, freelance writer; David Marglin, attorney; and Marc Weisskopf, professor of environmental epidemiology and physiology.

== Bibliography ==
- Bruno Tinel (2004), "À quoi servent les patrons?". Marglin et les radicaux américains, Lyon, ENS Editions.
- Bryer, R. A. (2002). "Towards a Marxist accounting history of the British Industrial Revolution: a review of evidence and suggestions for research". University of Warwick. CiteSeerX 10.1.1.484.8757.;
- Landes, David S. (1969). The Unbound Prometheus: Technological Change and Industrial Development in Western Europe from 1750 to the Present. Cambridge and New York: Cambridge University Press. ISBN 0-521-09418-6.
- ——— (1986). "What do bosses really do?". The Journal of Economic History. 46 (3): 585–623. doi:10.1017/S0022050700046799. JSTOR 2121476. S2CID 154524555.
- Tunzelmann, Nick von (2001). Historical Coevolution of Governance and Technology. Eindhoven Centre for Innovation Studies. CiteSeerX 10.1.1.133.3157.
