= Frédérique Apffel-Marglin =

Anthropologist

Frédérique Apffel-Marglin is a professor emerita of anthropology. She taught at Smith College in Massachusetts.

== Life ==
Apffel-Marglin finished high school at the Lycée Regnault, Tangier, Morocco. She received both her B.A. (Mediterranean Studies, 1973) and her Ph.D. (Anthropology, 1980) from Brandeis University.

Apffel-Marglin lived in India for several years. She was first a student of Indian Classical Dance (Odissi style) and later did her first field research among the temple dancers of Jagannath Temple in Orissa in the mid-1970s. Her later fieldwork was among agricultural communities in coastal Orissa. Since 1994, she has engaged in collaborative work with non-governmental organizations in Peru and Bolivia. She taught in graduate courses that those organizations offered from 1994 until 2005. She was the coordinator of Centers for Mutual Learning in Peru and Bolivia during that period. This project was funded by a MacArthur grant until 1999. In 2009 she founded a non-profit organization in the Peruvian High Amazon called Sachamama Center for Biocultural Regeneration (SCBR) that she directs. SCBR collaborates with local indigenous communities on the re-creation of a pre-Columbian anthropogenic soil of millenarian fertility discovered by archaeologists. She also directs summer study abroad programs for US undergraduates at SCBR.

She was a research advisor at the World Institute for Development Economics Research (WIDER) in Helsinki, an affiliate of the United Nations University, from 1985 until 1991. As part of that endeavor, she and Harvard economist Stephen Marglin formed an interdisciplinary and international collaborative team that has produced three books on critical approaches to development and globalization. She has published over 55 articles and 13 books.

She was one of the associate editors of the journal INTERculture.

== Writings (selection) ==
As author

- Subversive Spiritualities: How Rituals Enact the World, Oxford University Press, New York, 2011.
- Rhythms of Life: Enacting the World with the Goddesses of Orissa, Oxford University Press, 2008, ISBN 0-19-569419-8.
- The Spirit of Regeneration: Andean Culture Confronting Western Notions of Development, Palgrave 1998, ISBN 1-85649-548-5.
- Smallpox in Two Systems of Knowledge, Helsinki: WIDER, 1987 - also in: Dominating Knowledge, pp. 120–144.
- Wives of the God-King: The Rituals of the Devadasis of Puri, Oxford University Press, 1985.

as editor

- (with Sanjay Kumar) Interrogating Development: Insights from the Margins, Oxford University Press, Delhi, India, Fall 2010.
- (with Stephen A. Marglin): Dominating Knowledge: Development, Culture, and Resistance, Oxford: Clarendon Press, 1990, Reprint 2007.
- (with Tariq Banuri): Who Will Save the Forests?: Knowledge, Power and Environmental Destruction, Delhi: Zed Boks 1993.
- (with Stephen A. Marglin): Decolonizing Knowledge: From Development to Dialogue; A Study Prepared for the World Institute for Development Economics Research of the United Nations University, Oxford: Clarendon Press, 1996.
- (with John A. Grim): Indigenous Traditions and Ecology: The Interbeing of Cosmology and Community, Harvard University Press, 2000.
- Défaire le développement, refaire le monde [L'Association la Ligne d'Horizon - Les Amis de François Partant], Paris: Parangon, 2003.
- (with C. A. Bowers): Re-Thinking Freire: Globalization and the Environmental Crisis, Lawrence Erlbaum Associates, 2004, ISBN 0-8058-5114-3
- (with John Carman) Purity and Auspiciousness in Indian Society, Brill Leiden, 1985.
