= François Partant =

French economist

François Partant (1926 – 25 June 1987) was a French economist. He was one of the first theoreticians of degrowth. He is known for one of his books, The End of Development, published in 1982.
