= The Anti-Politics Machine =

Book by James Ferguson

- Title page for The Anti-Politics Machine: Development, Depoliticization, and Bureaucratic Power in Lesotho (1990)
- Author: James Ferguson
- Language: English
- Genre: Non-fiction
- Publisher: Cambridge University Press (UK); University of Minnesota Press (US)
- Publication date: 1990
- Publication place: United Kingdom

The Anti-Politics Machine: Development, Depoliticization, and Bureaucratic Power in Lesotho is a book by James Ferguson, originally published in 1990 by Cambridge University Press. The 1994 edition is available from the University of Minnesota Press. This book is a critique of the concept of "development" in general, viewed through the lens of failed attempts, specifically the Thaba-Tseka Development Project in Lesotho from 1975 to 1984. He writes about the countless "development agencies" that have their hand in the so-called "Third World" but points out the consistent failure of these agencies to bring about any sort of economic stability. This is what Ferguson calls the "development discourse fantasy", which arises from backward logic.

== Development as "anti-politics machine" ==
At a critical juncture in the early nineteenth century the state began to connect itself to a series of groups “that in different ways had long tried to shape and administer the lives of individuals in pursuit of various goals” rather than simply extend the absolutist state's repressive machinery of social control. Michel Foucault's work on the prison, the clinic, and the asylum – on the development of "bio-power" – analyzed the plurality of governing agencies and authorities who developed programs, strategies, and technologies that were deployed to optimize the health, welfare and life of populations. He referred to this process with the neologism "governmentality" (governmental rationality). One of the last of these new applied sciences was the "development apparatus", the post-world war extension of colonial rule after the independence of third world states.

Ferguson utilized the governmentality framework in The Anti-Politics Machine: "Development," Depoliticization and Bureaucratic Power in Lesotho (1990), the first in many similar explorations. Ferguson sought to explore how the "development discourse" works, that is, how the language and practices used by development specialists influence the ways in which development is delivered, and the unintended consequences it fosters. He found that development projects which failed on their own terms could be redefined as "successes" on which new projects were to be modeled. The net effect of development, he argues, has been to "de-politicize" questions of resource allocation and to strengthen bureaucratic power. In his analysis of a development project in Lesotho between 1978 and 1982, he examined the following discursive maneuvers.

=== Defining the "Less-Developed Country" (LDC) ===
We must ask: "why statements are acceptable in 'development' discourse that would be considered absurd in academic settings, but also why many acceptable statements from the realm of academic discourse - or even from that of common observation - fail to find their way into the discursive regime of 'development'"

Ferguson points out that a critical part of the development process is the way the object of development is defined. In defining this object, it is severed from its historical and geographic context, and isolated as a "Less-Developed Country". In the case of Lesotho, its history as a grain exporting region was ignored, as was its current role as a labor reserve for the South African mines. Not wanting to deal with the apartheid South African regime, development agencies isolated the "independent" Lesotho from the regional economy in which it was entrapped in their project rationales and reports. Artificially taken out of this larger capitalist context, Lesotho's economy was described as "isolated", "non-market", and "traditional", and thus a proper target for aid intervention.

Ferguson underscores that these discourses are produced within institutional settings where they must provide a charter for governmental intervention. Any analysis which suggests the roots of poverty lie in areas outside the scope of government are quickly dismissed and discarded since they cannot provide a rationale for state action. And since the capitalist economy is one such area which has been ideologically set outside the scope of governmental action, the discursive creation of a deformed ‘native economy’ creates the required opening for that intervention.

=== The Bovine Mystique ===
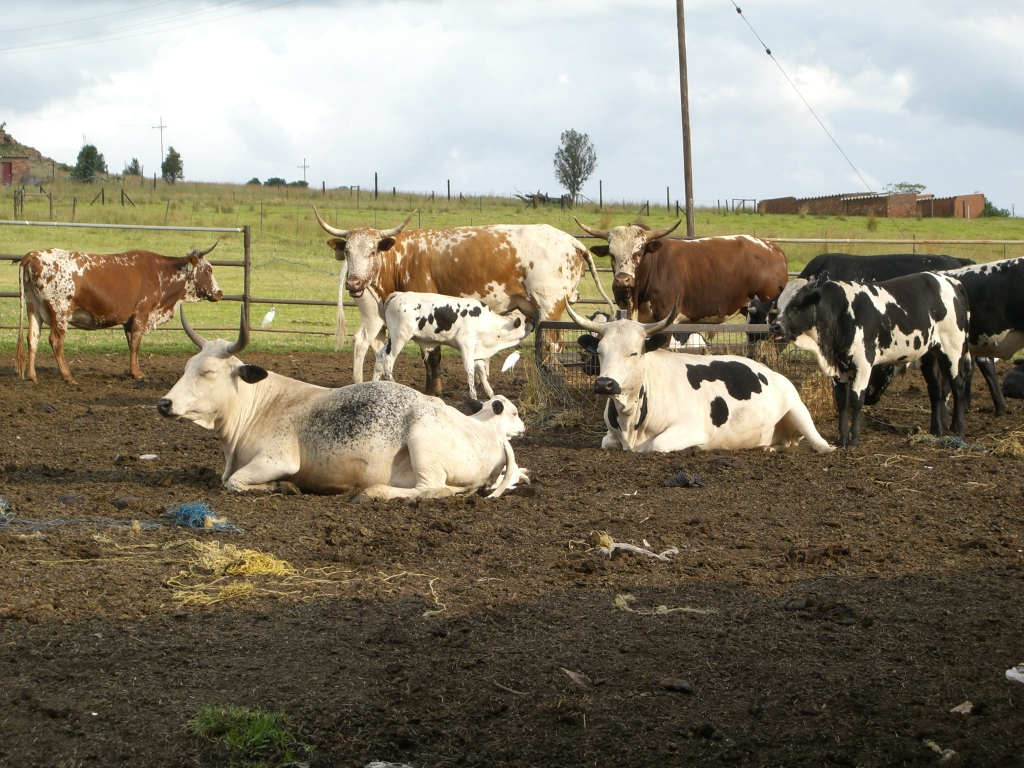
South African cattle breed

The development project at the heart of Ferguson's analysis sought to introduce "improved livestock management." Development professionals noted that pastures were overgrazed, and the cattle raised were not sold in markets. Indeed, even during a prolonged drought, the farmers of Lesotho refused to sell. The project managers rationalized this in terms of what Ferguson calls the "Bovine Mystique"; that local farmers were bound by traditional values that prevented them from entering the market. Their solution was to introduce markets, "superior" breeds of cattle, and privatize pasture.

Ferguson provides an alternate explanation of the Bovine Mystique, by placing Lesotho in its place in the regional economy of South Africa. Lesotho's rich farmlands had been taken by South Africa, leaving it a land-locked, resource-poor country, whose citizens could make money only by working in South African mines. The work was dangerous and sporadic, and limited to men. These men had no bank accounts in which to invest for retirement - usually brought on by injury. They thus invested in cattle bought in South Africa and left with family in Lesotho. These cattle thus became placeholders for absent men, keeping them involved in local social networks. They refused to sell the cattle because they were retirement savings; if they were sold earlier, the money would quickly disappear to meet a variety of always urgent needs of their own or their neighbors. They refused to sell in the drought because they realized that the dumping of all cattle on the markets would depress prices and they would earn next to nothing; better to chance they would survive. The principal error of the development workers was to view cattle rearing as farming, rather than a retirement investment.

=== The deployment of development ===
Location of Lesotho in South Africa

The development workers sought to resolve the problem of poverty and overgrazing in Lesotho by introducing development by introducing markets (although Lesotho had always marketed its crops, and its economy was commodified), "improved cattle" (Western breeds that were incapable of resisting drought and which required superior feed), and privatizing land (so that a small portion of the local population would have the pasture needed to keep the "improved cattle" alive).

Pasture in Lesotho was held collectively as a commons, owned and utilized by all villagers. Development workers sought to fence in the commons and prevent the vast majority from using their own land. Villagers tore down the fence.

The project tried to introduce cash crops, but the chemical inputs were so expensive they couldn't be grown without massive subsidies. Locals showed no interest in becoming commercial farmers; they were unemployed miners.

The development workers did institute a local cattle market, which they declared a success. However, local farmers had always been in the practice of selling cattle in their retirement. The local market did not mean they were transformed into commercial farmers; just that retirees had to travel less when they finally did decide to market their cattle.

=== Rule of experts: techno-politics ===
Ferguson wrote that it is not enough to note development's failures; even the project managers initially recognized it as a failure. If that was all Ferguson had done, his book would not have had the influence it did. Asking if development is a failure is asking the wrong question; it ignores the "instrument effects," or development's effects on the places where it operates. In other words, we should ask what non-economic functions does development serve? His answer:

1. It is an "anti-politics machine"; it makes blatantly political decisions about the allocation of resources appear to be "technical solutions to technical problems". Important questions, such as the reallocation of land to a limited number of elites, may be justified by the "necessity for the sustainable commercial management of livestock." A large proportion of men are deprived of their retirement savings.
2. "Integrated development" served to strengthen the presence of a repressive government in an isolated and resistant area. Development projects are dependent upon local governments for implementation, and rarely challenge the nature of that government. The resources they supply frequently serve state needs more than local needs.
3. It perpetuates the migrant labor system. The project neglected to look at Lesotho in the regional economy with South Africa. Lesotho was a labor reserve for Apartheid-era South African mines. The men of Lesotho were not farmers, but unemployed workers and retirees. Real commercial farming was never a possibility without large subsidies. The project thus served to preserve a pool of cheap labor for South Africa in a time when international sanctions against Apartheid were hitting its economy.

== See also ==
- Anti-politics
