= James Ferguson (anthropologist) =

American anthropologist (1959–2025)

James Gordon Ferguson
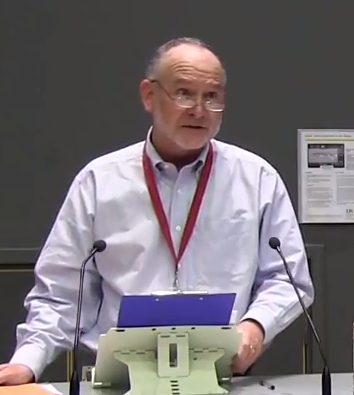
- Ferguson at the University of Sussex in 2016
- Born: June 16, 1959
- Died: February 12, 2025 (aged 65)
- Occupations: Professor, anthropologist
- Title: Susan S. and William H. Hindle Professor in the School of Humanities and Sciences

Academic background
- Education: B.A., M.A., Ph.D.
- Alma mater: University of California, Santa Barbara, Harvard University
- Thesis: Discourse, knowledge, and structural production in the "development" industry : an anthropological study of a rural development project in Lesotho (1985)

Academic work
- Discipline: Anthropologist
- Sub-discipline: Development studies
- Institutions: Stanford University (2003-2025); University of California, Irvine (1986-2003)
- Main interests: Political economy, Development studies, Migration

James Ferguson (June 16, 1959 – February 12, 2025) was an American anthropologist. He is known for his work on the politics and anthropology of international development, specifically his critical stance (development criticism). He was chair of the Anthropology Department at Stanford University. His best-known work is his book, The Anti-Politics Machine. He delivered the most prestigious lecture in anthropology, the Morgan Lecture, in 2009, for his work on basic income.

== Early life and education ==
Ferguson was born on June 16, 1959. He earned his B.A. in cultural anthropology from the University of California, Santa Barbara and an M.A. and Ph.D. in social anthropology from Harvard University.

== Academic career ==
Ferguson has argued against reducing the issues of developing countries in terms of what they lack against Western liberal ideals of governance, and to instead closely study how social and political life actually happens in such places. He attributed his interest in the anthropology of Africa to his professors David W. Brokensha and Paul Bohannan as well as a desire to bridge the gap between traditional anthropological literature on Africa and the contemporary de-colonial struggles of the 1970s. In connection, he was heavily involved in anthropological conversations on how to connect the nuanced insights of local ethnographic studies with larger global developments and how anthropological perspectives could challenge and modify concepts such as "modernity", "globalization" and especially "development".

Ferguson was best known for his book The Anti-Politics Machine, which criticizes conceptions of development by institutions such as the IMF. Ferguson criticized depictions of nations like Lesotho as "traditional subsistence peasant [societies]" that needed the introduction of neoliberal market logic, arguing that the IMF ignored the long-standing integration of Lesotho with the modern economy through the Apartheid-era migrant labor system.

In his later book, Give a Man a Fish, Ferguson argued that development projects rely on a flawed "politics of production" that seeks to make poor people more productive in their labor through training and education. Using the case of southern Africa however, Ferguson argued that demand for new employment opportunities did not naturally keep up with this supply. Instead, he argued for a "politics of distribution" such as universal basic income in tandem with social structures of distribution and dependence already prevalent in southern Africa that are more complex than reductive ideas of "handouts" or "laziness".

Ferguson’s childhood friend, neuroscientist‑writer Daniel Levitin, has woven him into every one of his books, using Ferguson’s observations and amusing experiences to illuminate broader points about the nature of being human. In This Is Your Brain on Music for example, Levitin relays how Ferugson, while conducting fieldwork in Lesotho, joined a village song only to decline singing, saying simply, “I don’t sing,” to puzzled villagers who couldn’t conceive of someone opting out of what to them was a universal impulse.

== Death ==
Ferguson died on February 12, 2025, at the age of 65.

== Selected publications ==
- 2021, Presence and Social Obligation. Prickly Paradigm Press.
- 2015, Give a Man a Fish. Duke University Press.
- 2010, The Uses of Neoliberalism. Antipode, volume 41, supplement 1, 2010.
- 2006, Global Shadows: Africa in the Neoliberal World Order, Duke University Press.
- 1999, Expectations of Modernity: Myths and Meanings of Urban Life on the Zambian Copperbelt, University of California Press.
- 1997, Editor, Anthropological Locations: Boundaries and Grounds of a Field Science (with Akhil Gupta), Univ. of California Press.
- 1997, Editor, Culture, Power, Place: Explorations in Critical Anthropology (with Akhil Gupta), Duke University Press.
- 1990, The Anti-Politics Machine: 'Development,' Depoliticization, and Bureaucratic Power in Lesotho, Cambridge University Press. Republished in 1994 by University of Minnesota Press.
