= Campism =

Supporting one geopolitical side against all others

Campism is the belief that the world is divided into large, competing political groups of countries ("camps") and that people with specific political alignments should support one camp over the other camps. The term is most commonly used in reference to left-wing politics. Unlike nationalists, campists do not support any countries for reasons such as ethnicity or national identity. Instead, campists support their camp for ideological reasons, because they believe their camp promotes their ideology, such as capitalism, liberal democracy, socialism, or anti-imperialism.

In general, a first-campist is someone who sides with the United States and its allies; a second-campist is someone who sides with the bloc of countries opposing the United States (such as with the Soviet Union and its allies, with communist countries in general, or with Russia and its allies); and a third-campist is someone who takes neither side and instead hopes to organize the global working class into a third bloc.

Campism is an application of lesser of two evils to global power politics: A first-campist or second-campist believes their camp, for all its flaws, is better than its opposition.

== History ==
=== Origin of the term ===
Socialists have long held sharply divergent views on major international crises. For example, the internationalist–defencist schism during World War I led to the split of the anti-war Independent Social Democratic Party of Germany (USPD) from the pro-war Social Democratic Party of Germany (SPD) and the split of the pro-war Social Democratic League of America (SDLA) from the anti-war Socialist Party of America (SPA).

These divisions were also present in the 1930s, after Leon Trotsky was expelled from the Soviet Union by Joseph Stalin. All Trotskyists opposed Stalinism, but differed on why and how. Trotsky argued that the Soviet Union was a degenerated workers' state. According to these Trotskyists, although a small ruling class had taken control, the Soviet Union had made social revolutionary gains for workers and should be defended from outside aggression. Instead of outside invasion, the Soviet working class should lead a political revolution to seize back control.

From 1929 to 1933 (the Third Period), the Soviet Union attacked unaligned socialists and social democrats as social fascists. In a sharp reversal after Adolf Hitler's rise to power, the Soviet Union pursued a popular front strategy from 1934 to 1939 and again from 1941 to 1945, in which communists attempted to build broad anti-fascist alliances. In this view, the world was divided into fascist and anti-fascist camps:

- First bloc: Fascist powers, including Germany, Italy, Japan, and their allies
- Second bloc: Anti-fascist powers, including the Soviet Union and its allies

An April 1940 cartoon from The New International, a third-campist publication edited by Schachtman

In contrast, and especially after the Molotov–Ribbentrop Pact of 1939, Third camp Trotskyists such as Max Shachtman argued that the Soviet Union was a bureaucratic collectivist regime which had joined one of two great imperialist camps that wanted to conquer the world. Third-campists believed the world was divided into three camps:

- First bloc: Imperialist powers in the United Kingdom, the United States, and France
- Second bloc: Imperialist powers in Germany, Italy, Japan, and the Soviet Union
- Third bloc: Yet to be created, which would unite working class and colonized people in revolutionary, anti-imperialist struggle

In World War II, the United Nations defeated the fascist Rome–Berlin Axis. Afterwards, third-campists believed the new camps were those of the Cold War:

- First bloc: Capitalist imperialists, led by the United States
- Second bloc: Social imperialists, led by the Soviet Union
- Third bloc: Yet to be created, which would unite working and colonized people

In this context, a "campist" was someone (especially a socialist) who supported the first or second camp instead of participating in building the third camp. For example, some Trotskyists and members of the Socialist Party of America became "first campists", and later neoconservatives. In contrast, other Trotskyists (such as Sam Marcy of the Workers World Party) became "second campists" who supported the Soviet Union, such as during the Hungarian Revolution of 1956. Second campists are sometimes called tankies.

=== After World War II ===
During decolonization, billions of people won their independence in Africa and Asia. Most of these countries did not pick a "side" in the Cold War. These divisions led to Alfred Sauvy's three-world model in 1952:

- First world: Capitalist countries, led by the United States
- Second world: Communist countries, led by the Soviet Union
- Third world: All other countries

Both the United States and Soviet Union supported the identification of the first camp with capitalism and second camp with communism, in order to orient their allies away from infighting and toward fighting the "other" camp.

The "bloc" system became increasingly complex after World War II. After the 1948 Tito–Stalin split and 1960s Sino-Soviet split, the socialist "second camp" was increasingly fractured into many competing ideologies (such as Maoism and Hoxhaism) and countries. As a result, many "second camp" socialist organizations split, based on their support for specific socialist governments. For example, the pro-Soviet Communist Party USA (CPUSA) expelled the pro-China Progressive Labor Party (PLP) in 1961.

After the 1955 Bandung Conference, many post-imperialized countries joined the Non-Aligned Movement (NAM), which was opposed to both "blocs" in the Cold War. This NAM was ideologically heterogenous, and member countries received support from both American and Soviet benefactors, but the movement leaned toward socialism. Many nominally socialist countries, such as Egypt (led by Nasser), Yugoslavia (Tito), Indonesia (Sukarno), and Cuba (Castro), took leading roles. In Castro's Havana Declaration of 1979, he summarized the NAM's purpose as "struggle against imperialism, colonialism, neo-colonialism, racism, and all forms of foreign aggression, occupation, domination, interference or hegemony as well as against great power and bloc politics." NAM represented an alternative to the two-camp order of the Cold War.

The NAM is sometimes associated with Third-worldism, which promoted Global South governments (as representatives of peasants and workers and people of color) against Global North governments (as representatives of capitalist imperialism). Third Worldism also led to pan-Arabism, pan-Africanism, pan-Americanism and pan-Asianism. Third Worldism identifies imperialism as the "primary contradiction" in the world, and some Third Worldists sort the world into two camps: Imperialist countries and imperialized countries.

All of these developments — the fragmentation of the socialist "camp", the rise of non-Communist socialist countries, and a new way to divide the world into "camps" — created new types of campism.

=== After the collapse of the Soviet Union ===
Modern first-worldist organizations, especially neoconservative organizations, reoriented their worldview around democracy promotion by the United States and Islamic extremism. In the modern first-worldist view, there are two real camps:

- First camp: Democratic countries, led by the United States
- Second camp: Undemocratic countries, chiefly Russia, China, Venezuela, and Iran
- Third (non-)camp: Unaligned countries

After the dissolution of the Soviet Union and Warsaw Pact, the "second camp" mostly disappeared, and with it, most second-campism. (See List of communist states.) Modern communist second-campists adhering to Marxism–Leninism usually support only Cuba and/or North Korea as "actually existing socialism" ("AES"). Others also support China, Vietnam, Laos, and Venezuela, despite their adoption of socialist market economy-type policies. In the modern communist second-campist view, there are two real camps:

- First camp: Capitalist countries, led by the United States
- Second camp: Anti-capitalist countries, possibly including:
  - Restrictive view: Cuba, North Korea
  - Expansive view: China, Vietnam, Laos, and Venezuela
- Third (non-)camp: Unaligned countries

Other socialist organizations, especially those inspired by Maoism, shifted toward Third-worldism or Maoism–Third Worldism and labor aristocracy theory. This view became substantially stronger after the United States invasion of Iraq in 2003 and again after the Russian invasion of Ukraine in 2014. In the modern self proclaimed "anti-imperialist" second-campist view, there are two real camps:

- First camp: "Imperialist" countries, led by the United States; similar to imperial core, to Global North, or to Western world
- Second camp: "Anti-imperialist" countries, possibly led by China, Venezuela, or Russia; similar to the Global South, or peripheral countries, or to non-West but often simply defined as any nation that stands in opposition to the first camp.
- Third (non-)camp: Unaligned countries

== Criticism ==
Critics of modern campism argue that it creates an inaccurate one-dimensional view of each camp, such as a "monolithic Global North" against a "monolithic Global South", whereas each camp is a heterogenous bundle of alliances. In this view, second-campism will often "boil down to the simple procedure of determining which side the US is on in any given conflict and automatically taking the opposite position". In addition, campist logic encourages a simplified, Manichean (purely good or purely bad) analysis of social movements. For example, pro-Russia campists often claim that the 2014 Ukrainian revolution was a West-orchestrated fascist coup, while anti-Russia campists often deny any far-right presence. For another example, supporters of the war on terror describe their opponents as terrorists or sympathizers (such as George W. Bush's "Either you are with us, or you are with the terrorists").

More broadly, "support" for a camp usually amounts to rhetoric and protest that yield no "concrete gains", because few campists hold political power and each "camp" is a massive entity. A "preoccupation" with "abstract" questions of foreign policy "has been historically corrosive for the left, leading to bitter fights over precisely those issues which we are least able to affect".

For example, during the Cold War, first-campist capitalists who adopted Domino theory supported late European imperial projects, as in the First Indochina War, and autocrats, as in South Korea (Rhee), South Vietnam (Diem), Indonesia (Suharto), and China (Chiang). Second-campist socialists similarly supported autocrats, as in the Soviet Union (Stalin), China (Mao), North Vietnam (Ho), and North Korea (Kim), and expansions of state socialist power, as in the Eastern Bloc takeovers and invasions (Germany in 1953, Hungary in 1956, and Czechoslovakia in 1968).

Some second-campists support "multipolarity", in which several great powers compete for power, and argue that the United States should not have unipolarity. Critics argue that, while multipolarity has limited US ability to control societies around the world, it has expanded the ability of other countries to pursue their own imperialist agendas.

== See also ==
- Orthodox Trotskyism
- Third camp
- Shachtmanism
- World-systems theory
- List of left-wing internationals
- Three Worlds Theory
- Three-world model
  - First World
  - Second World
  - Third World
  - Fourth World
