= Semi-colony =

Marxist term for a country dominated by another

In Marxist theory, a semi-colony is a country which is officially recognized as a politically independent state and as a sovereign nation, but which is in reality dependent on and/or dominated by another (imperialist) country (or, in some cases, several imperialist countries or corporations). A country could have been independent before it became a semi-colony, and it could have gained full independence after it had been a semi-colony.

== Forms of dependence and domination ==
The dependence or domination of a semi-colony could take different forms:

- economic - foreign control over the supply of capital, technology and/or essential imported goods; and foreign control over strategic assets, industrial sectors and/or foreign trade.
- political - legal agreements and contracts defining government policy, or the direct intervention by the imperialist country in the political affairs of the semi-colony, to secure client-regimes.
- military - the presence or control exercised by foreign troops, or foreign surveillance.
- cultural/ideological - the imposition of a foreign culture or foreign religion on the local population through the media, education and foreign consumer products.
- technological - the dependence on foreign technology, or the technological domination by a foreign country.
- demographic - the immigration into the semi-colony of large numbers of settlers from other countries, which dominate the indigenous population of the semi-colony; the expulsion or killing of indigenous people; and/or the imposition of controls over inward and outward migration.

== Semi-colony and neo-colony ==
The term "semi-colony" is often used interchangeably with neo-colony. The term "neo-colony" usually refers to a country which originally was a colony but later became a formally sovereign country, although de facto it still remained dominated by another country. In this case, there exists a "new" type of (informal) colonialism replacing the old colonialism, despite formal independence. A colony in this sense could have "semi-colonial" status after it formerly obtained sovereign political independence while it remained in many important respects dependent on other countries. Many semi-colonies in Africa, Asia and Latin America are, according to some analysts, still dominated by the imperialist countries which once colonised them, or by other imperialist powers. The suggestion is often that there is the "formality" of sovereignty, but not real sovereignty. A semi-colony could be a "partly colonized country" or a "partly decolonized" country.

According to Michael Barratt Brown,

"The concept of neo-colonialism was invented by French Marxists in the late 1950s, taken up by the leaders of the 'non-aligned' Asian and African ex-colonies in the early 1960s and incorporated thereafter into Marxist writings (Mandel, 1964, p. 17). The new leaders of ex-colonial African states described neo-colonialism as 'the survival of the colonial system in spite of formal recognition of political independence in emerging countries, which became the victims of an indirect and subtle form of domination by political, economic, social, military or technical (forces)…' (see O'Connor, 1970, p. 117)".

== Gradations of colonization ==
The term "semi-colony" is also used for countries which, although they officially never became full-scale colonies, or were not colonized on a very large scale, were nevertheless dominated by and/or dependent on other (imperialist) countries. In this case, there can exist national characteristics analogous to colonial dependence and domination alongside a prior tradition of national sovereignty or political independence (cf. Persia, China, Thailand, Afghanistan, Yemen, and Ethiopia in the 19th century and early 20th century). Countries without colonial past could nevertheless be dominated by a superpower such as the United States, or were dominated by the Soviet Union (see American imperialism, Soviet empire and Russian imperialism). A semi-colonial status is sometimes ascribed to a country, simply because it lacked much capitalist industrial development in its economy, which made the country dependent on other (industrialized) countries for importing modern technology, modern consumer goods and knowledge.

Some semi-colonies were originally "settler colonies" attracting large numbers of foreign immigrants, while in other semi-colonies, the indigenous population always remained the vast majority of the population (see also dominant minority).

There have been many different types, histories and gradations of colonization, and consequently also many different types, histories and gradations of decolonization. Colonization and decolonization processes in different places usually had both some common characteristics and some unique characteristics. Some analysts suggest that the general colonization and decolonization process can be periodized as a sequence of common "phases" or "stages". Others argue that there is not really any substantive evidence for a universal sequence of events; each country has its own developmental path, influenced by national peculiarities and its position in the world capitalist order (see also uneven and combined development).

In many cases, there is no consensus or broad agreement among historians and social scientists about how exactly the terms "colony", "neo-colony" or "semi-colony" should be applied to a given dependent country. To some extent, the descriptions can remain controversial or contested.

== Client relationship ==
The relationship between the semi-colony and the country (or countries) dominating it is said to benefit:

- the position of semi-colonial elite or ruling class (which serves both its own interest and the interests of foreign investors and creditors).
- the imperialist country or its multinational corporations, which obtain profits and cheap resources from their investments in the semi-colony.
- employees in the "advanced" foreign-owned industrial sectors within the semi-colony, which often offer better wages and conditions to skilled industrial workers, as compared to labourers and farmers working on the land.
- the population of the dominating country, because they can buy cheap imported goods and services produced in the semi-colony.

The semi-colonial predicament however mainly disadvantages the majority of the working population in the semi-colony, insofar as balanced economic development in the semi-colony is impossible - that is, only those industries and institutions are developed in the semi-colony which mainly benefit foreign investors, or which mainly benefit/support the export trade (usually extractive mineral and foodstuff industries).

== Social structures, ethnic composition and political trajectories ==
The class structure of a "typical" or "classical" semi-colony features a large mass of peasants and unemployed, a relatively small urban working class and middle class, a class of landowners, and an urban comprador bourgeoisie. However, a variety of different class structures, ethnic compositions and complex political trajectories are possible in semi-colonial countries. For example,

- During the 19th and early 20th centuries, the British colony of New Zealand (since 1907 a dominion of the British Empire) engaged in imperialist interventions and annexations in the Pacific. Today, New Zealand is a major aid donor in the South Pacific, and a large number of Pacific Islanders now live in New Zealand.
- In what is now Israel, a new colonial settler state arose out of a Jewish insurgency against British rule in Mandatory Palestine during the late 1940s, as well as the 1948 Palestine war against the Palestinians; the state of Israel continues to expand its territory via annexations and depends heavily on military, economic and political support from the federal government of the United States, as well as from private U.S. investors/donors.
- In the American Revolutionary War, armed forces commanded by George Washington engaged in eight years of conflict with the British which ultimately led to Britain recognizing the sovereign independence of the United States. At the same time, the American government mostly denied the sovereignty of American Indians over their ancestral lands, and not infrequently tried to exterminate the Indians, and/or relocate them to reservations set aside for Indians. It was characteristic of American political thinking, that sovereignty was not necessarily regarded as a good thing or as a bad thing, and that a people or a nation was not automatically entitled to sovereignty and territory because they lived somewhere, and had lived there for a long time. It all depended on the interests that were at stake, what the balance of power happened to be, and what was regarded as a "progressive" policy (see also: United States involvement in regime change and Foreign interventions by the United States).

== Origins of the term ==
In his pamphlet on imperialism, Imperialism, the Highest Stage of Capitalism (1917), V.I. Lenin wrote:

"As to the 'semicolonial' states, they provide an example of the transitional forms which are to be found in all spheres of nature and society. Finance capital is such a great, such a decisive, you might say, force in all economic and in all international relations, that it is capable of subjecting, and actually does subject, to itself even states enjoying the fullest political independence; we shall shortly see examples of this. Of course, finance capital finds most 'convenient', and derives the greatest profit from, a form of subjection which involves the loss of the political independence of the subjected countries and peoples. In this respect, the semi-colonial countries provide a typical example of the 'middle stage'. It is natural that the struggle for these semidependent countries should have become particularly bitter in the epoch of finance capital, when the rest of the world has already been divided up."

The critical concept of a "semi-colony" (Russian: полуколония, romanized: polukoloniya) was popularized in the earlier years of the Communist International, which classified the countries of the world as being either imperialist countries, or semi-colonies, or colonies. From that definition followed a political strategy for the labour movement in each type of country (for example as regards nationalisation of industry, workers' rights, democratisation, the ownership of land). The general perspective of the Communist International was that it was impossible for semi-colonial countries to achieve substantive industrialisation, agrarian reform and the transformation of property relations without a socialist and democratic revolution. In other words, workers and peasants had to overthrow the power of the semi-colonial élite in order to liberate a semi-colony from its client-relationship with foreign powers and to make comprehensive local economic development possible.

The category of "intermediate countries" was officially added in the later 1920s. Thus, for example, at the 15th Congress of the CPSU in 1927, Stalin stated:

"Judge for yourselves. Of the 1,905 million inhabitants of the entire globe, 1,134 million live in the colonies and dependent countries, 143,000,000 live in the U.S.S.R., 264,000,000 live in the intermediate countries, and only 363,000,000 live in the big imperialist countries, which oppress the colonies and dependent countries."

Usually the "intermediate countries" were independent nations lacking colonies (or without significant foreign territories), with some industrial development as well as a traditional agricultural sector.

Subsequently, the theoretical discussion about the concept of a semi-colony was influenced by historical studies about semi-colonialism in pre-revolutionary China.

In his 1940 article On New Democracy, Mao Zedong wrote:

"Since the invasion of foreign capitalism and the gradual growth of capitalist elements in Chinese society, the country has changed by degrees into a colonial, semi-colonial and semi-feudal society. China today is colonial in the Japanese-occupied areas and basically semi-colonial in the Kuomintang areas, and it is predominantly feudal or semi-feudal in both. Such, then, is the character of present-day Chinese society and the state of affairs in our country. The politics and the economy of this society are predominantly colonial, semi-colonial and semi-feudal, and the predominant culture, reflecting the politics and economy, is also colonial, semi-colonial and semi-feudal. It is precisely against these predominant political, economic and cultural forms that our revolution is directed. What we want to get rid of is the old colonial, semi-colonial and semi-feudal politics and economy and the old culture in their service. And what we want to build up is their direct opposite, i.e., the new politics, the new economy and the new culture of the Chinese nation."

== Debates and contemporary relevance ==
Ankie Hoogvelt, a specialist in international political economy, commented at the beginning of the 21st century that:

“… the Third World no longer exists. That is to say, it is no longer there as a unitary classificatory descriptor of the economic, social and political conditions of the countries of Africa, Latin America and Asia, and with it, development studies has disappeared. (…) [From the] beginning of the twenty-first century we are experiencing a complete, radical break, a qualitative change, in the historical development of capitalism. The world economic crisis that began in the 1970s has led, not just to a restructuring of the world economy, but to a major transformation of the way in which production and distribution are organized. There is a new political economy in the making.”

With the expansion of the world market and globalization especially from the 1970s onwards, the "semi-colonial" status of particular countries became more debatable because a number of them (such as the Four Asian Tigers, and the BRICS countries) were able to industrialize to a significant extent within the capitalist world market and without overthrowing the capitalist state, becoming at least "semi-industrialized" or even fully industrialized countries (see also newly industrialized country). They gained more financial, political and cultural autonomy, they abandoned the old colonial culture, and the local elite became a major foreign investor in its own right. They were no longer clearly under the control of another foreign country, although to a considerable extent still dominated or politically influenced by wealthier countries and international financial institutions.

In the global perspective of the Communist International, each country in the world could be categorized and ranked according to its place in the hierarchy of the capitalist world order, and a correct political strategy could be defined accordingly, for each country. This approach was based on a specific Leninist interpretation of global imperialism and the division of the world into spheres of influence. However, across a hundred years of world development, all sorts of changes have taken place in how countries are positioned in the world economy and in global geopolitics. The majority of countries no longer have the same position that they used to have. This raises the question of whether the critical concept of a "semi-colony" is still relevant, or whether it has become an outdated, archaic concept that cannot accurately describe current realities in world society anymore.

For example, Australia (previously a colony, since 1901 a dominion of the British Empire, and since 1986 fully independent) has been described as a "client state" but also as an "imperialist" country. (see also Territorial evolution of Australia). Some scholars prefer to use the world-systems theory labels of "core", "semi-periphery" and "periphery" to describe the structure of the capitalist world order. Other scholars regard the Wallersteinian "world system" classifications to be outdated in the new multipolar world order. Martin Wolf distinguishes between stagnant "low-income countries" and developing "low-income turned into middle-income countries"; he emphasizes the economic divergence of the two in the 21st century. Whatever the case, the definition of a country as a "semi-colony" usually refers to a specific critical analysis of its dependent place in the world economy, world trade and the world political order, as well as to its local political/economic culture and social structure.

== Far-left views ==
The concept of "semi-colony" is still used in later Maoist movements, including the Shining Path in Peru, the Communist Party of India (Maoist) and the Communist Party of the Philippines which regard their respective countries as "semi-colonies". Some contemporary Trotskyist groups, such as the League for a Fifth International interpret Lenin's analysis of imperialism in a way which defines the vast majority of states in the world as semi-colonies, including all of Eastern Europe. According to the revolutionary communist Michael Pröbsting, Greece has become a semi-colony.

== See also ==
- Aid
- Aid effectiveness
- Client state
- Colony
- Commonwealth of Nations
- Dependency theory
- Development aid
- Dominion
- East–West dichotomy
- Fourth World
- Global North and Global South
- Imperialism
- International financial institutions
- List of colonies
- List of countries and dependencies by area
- List of countries that have gained independence from the United Kingdom
- List of empires
- List of former European colonies
- List of largest empires
- National question
- Neocolonialism
- New imperialism
- Non-Aligned Movement
- North–South model
- Satellite state
- Sovereignty
- Theories of imperialism
- Three-world model
- Unequal exchange
- Uneven and combined development
- United Nations list of non-self-governing territories
