= Three Worlds Theory =

Maoist interpretation of international relations

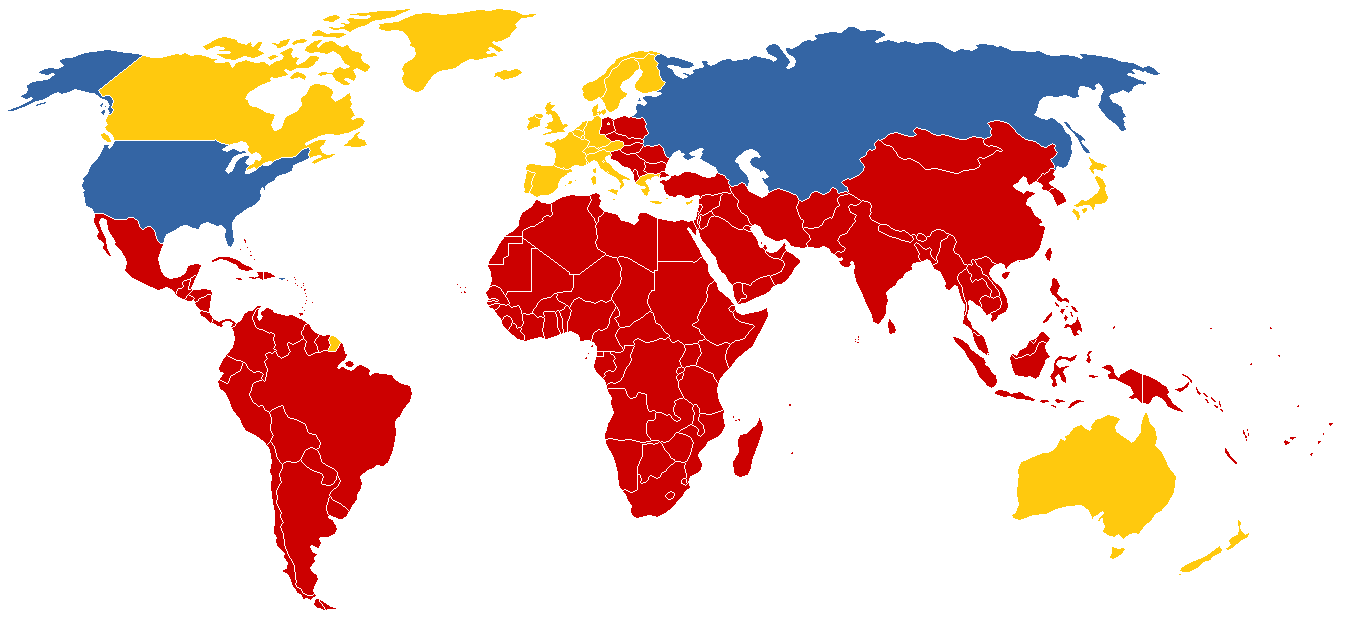
First World Second World Third World

The Three Worlds Theory (simplified Chinese: 三个世界的理论; traditional Chinese: 三個世界的理論; pinyin: Sān gè Shìjiè de Lǐlùn), in the field of international relations, posits that the international system during the Cold War operated as three contradictory politico-economic worlds.

== Development ==
The precursor of the Three Worlds Theory was Mao Zedong's formulation of the "intermediate zones". Mao based this idea on the rivalry between the United States and the Soviet Union, stating between the two superpowers were "many capitalist countries, colonial, and semi-colonial countries." Mao described Africa and Latin America as the "First Intermediate Zone," in which China's status as a non-white power might enable it to compete with and supersede both American and Soviet influence. The more advanced economies of Europe and Japan constituted the second intermediate zone.

Mao articulated the Three World Theory in the 1970s. On April 10, 1974, at the 6th Special Session United Nations General Assembly, Vice-Premier Deng Xiaoping applied the Three Worlds Theory during the New International Economic Order presentations about the problems of raw materials and development, to explain the PRC's economic co-operation with non-communist countries.

The First World comprises the Soviet Union and the United States, the two superpowers. The Second World comprises Canada, Japan, the countries of Europe, and the other countries of Global North. The Third World comprises China, India, the countries of Africa, Latin America and the Caribbean, and the other countries of Asia.

As political science, the Three Worlds Theory is a Maoist interpretation and geopolitical reformulation of international relations. It is different from the three-world model created by French demographer Alfred Sauvy, in which the First World comprises the United Kingdom, the United States, and their allies; the Second World comprises the People's Republic of China, the Soviet Union, and their allies; and the Third World comprises the economically underdeveloped countries, including the 120 countries of the Non-Aligned Movement (NAM).

The Three Worlds Theory was one of the inspirations for Muammar Gaddafi's Third International Theory.

The theory continues to influence China's approach towards multilateralism, including its advocacy for an increasingly multi-polar world during the General Secretaryship of Xi Jinping.

== Criticism ==
In the 1970s, the Party of Labour of Albania led by Enver Hoxha began to openly criticize the Three Worlds Theory, describing it as anti-Leninist and a chauvinist theory. These criticisms were elaborated upon at length in works by Enver Hoxha, including The Theory and Practice of the Revolution and Imperialism and the Revolution, and were also published in the newspaper of the Party of Labour of Albania, Zëri i Popullit. The publication of these works and the subsequent active criticism of the Three Worlds Theory in Albanian media played a part in the growing ideological divide between Albania and China that would ultimately culminate in Albania denouncing the People's Republic of China and Maoism as revisionist.

== See also ==
- Africa–China relations
- World-systems theory
- Third-Worldism
- Third World socialism
- Maoism–Third Worldism
- First World
- Second World
- Third World
- Fourth World
- Developed country
- Developing country
- Anti-revisionism
