= Global Southwest =

Southwestern region of the world

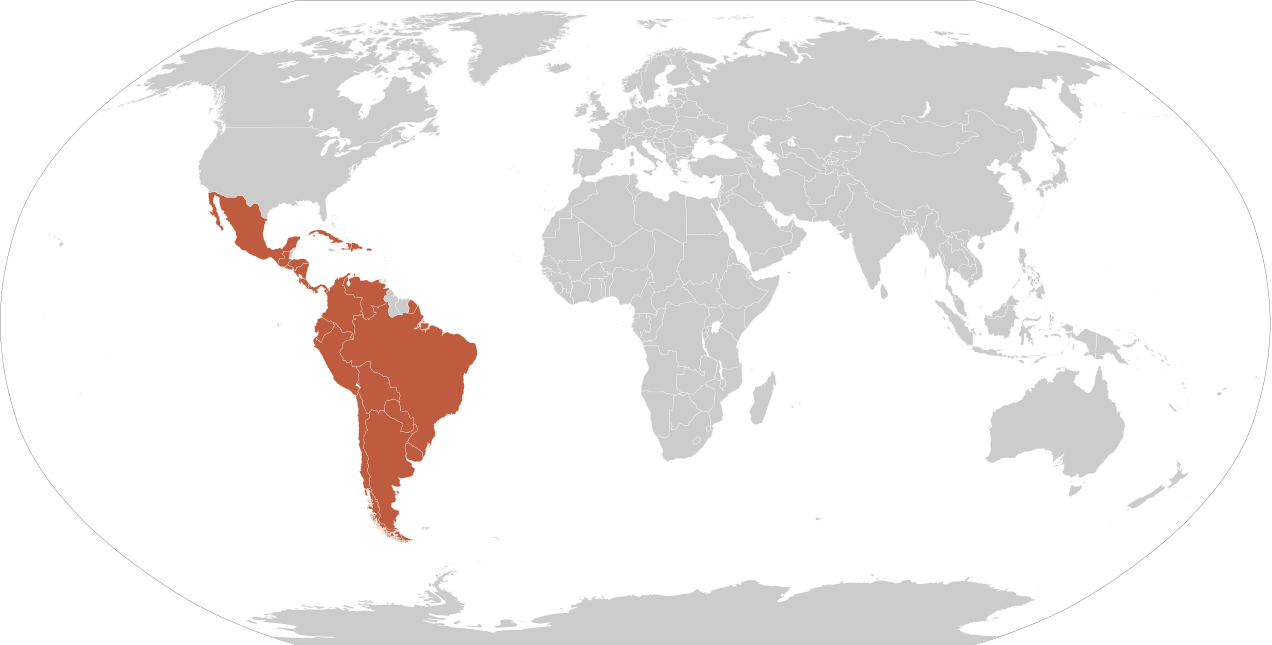
The Global Southwest mainly corresponds to Latin America and some parts of the Southern United States.

The Global Southwest is the southwestern region of the world. It mainly includes Latin America, although it can broadly include the Caribbean as well. The term can also be used to refer to the interaction between the American South (or the southern border region in general) and Latin America (primarily with Mexico).

== See also ==
- Global North and Global South
  - Global Northwest
- Global East
  - Global Southeast
