= Three-world model =

Political alignments of states during the Cold War

Political alignments in Europe during the Cold War after 1961

The three-world model is a lens of political analysis describing the world during the Cold War. The model divides the world's nations into three groups: the First, Second, and Third Worlds.

== History ==
=== Background ===
The terms First World, Second World, and Third World were originally used to divide the world's nations into three categories. The complete overthrow of the pre–World War II status quo left two superpowers (the United States and the Soviet Union) vying for global supremacy during the Cold War. Each power formed their own political blocs, which were the basis of the concepts of the First and Second Worlds. The Third World consisted of countries that were not closely aligned with either bloc.

=== Cold War ===
Early in the Cold War era, NATO and the Warsaw Pact were created by the United States and the Soviet Union, respectively. They were also referred to as the Western Bloc and the Eastern Bloc. The circumstances of these two blocs were so different that they were essentially two worlds, however, they were not numbered first and second. The onset of the Cold War is marked by Winston Churchill's famous "Iron Curtain" speech. In this speech, Churchill describes the division of the West and East to be so solid that it could be called an iron curtain.

In 1952, the French demographer Alfred Sauvy coined the term Third World in reference to the three estates in pre-revolutionary France. The first two estates being the nobility and clergy and everybody else comprising the third estate. He compared the capitalist world (i.e., First World) to the nobility and the communist world (i.e., Second World) to the clergy. The First World countries were characterized by economic prosperity, technological advancement, and political stability, whereas the Second World countries were characterized by state-controlled economies and centralized political structures. Just as the third estate comprised everybody else, Sauvy called the Third World all the countries that were not in this Cold War division, i.e., the unaligned and uninvolved states in the "East–West Conflict." The Third World countries are often described as developing nations with diverse economic, social, and political conditions. With the coining of the term Third World directly, the first two groups came to be known as the "First World" and "Second World," respectively. Here the three-world system emerged.

=== Post Cold War ===
With the fall of the Soviet Union in 1991, the Eastern Bloc ceased to exist; with it, so did all applicability of the Three-world model.

== See also ==
- First World
- Second World
- Third World
- Fourth World
- Eastern world
- Western world
- Developed country
- Developing country
- Digital divide
- Global North and Global South
- Globalization
- Great Divergence
- List of countries by total private wealth
- List of countries by wealth per adult
- Multinational corporation
- Three Worlds Theory, Maoist political concept
