= Global East =

Eastern region of world

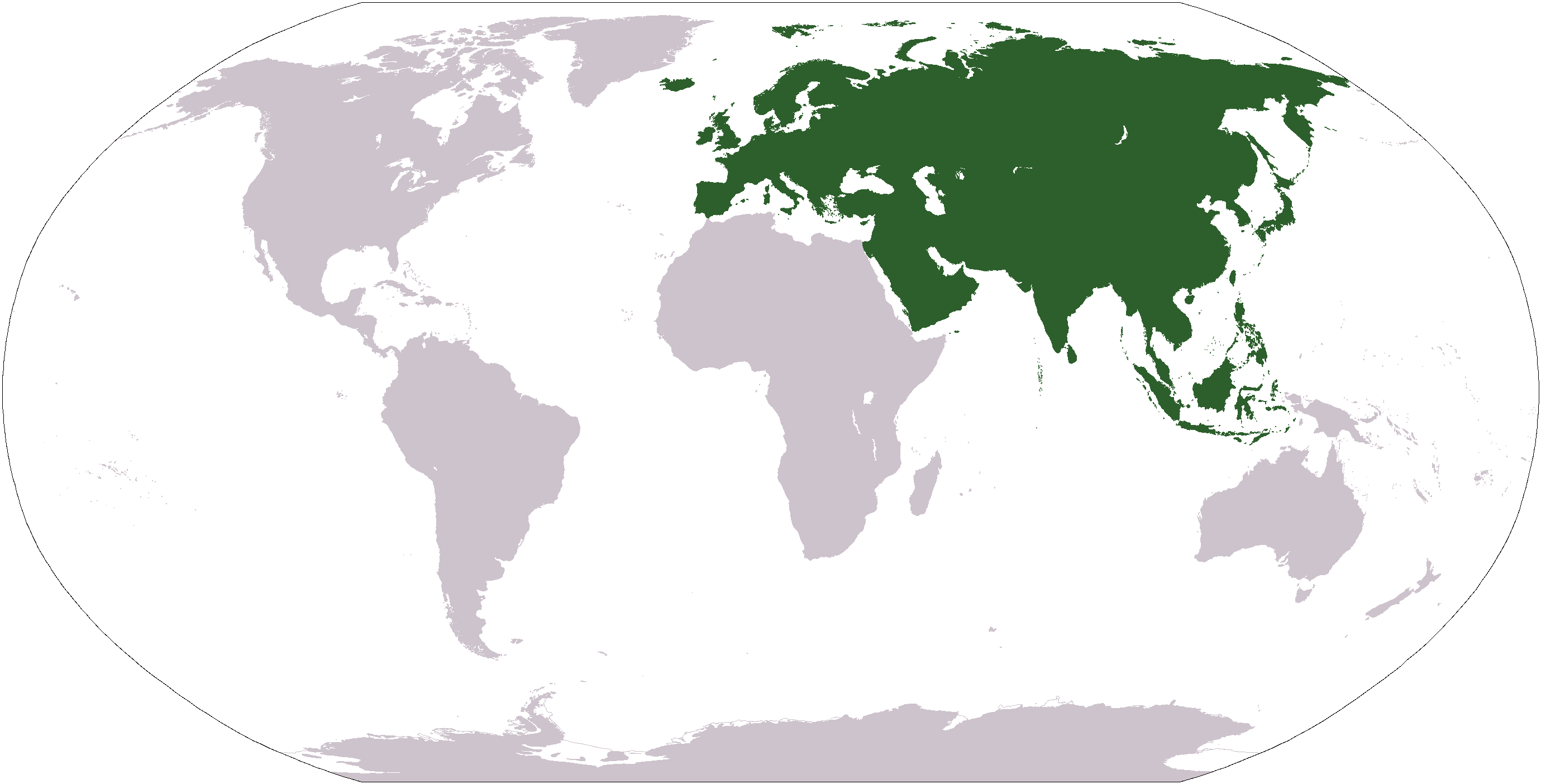
In its broadest definition, the Global East incorporates much of Eurasia (except Western Europe), which is pictured above.

The Global East is a region of the world which has varying definitions. It can be narrowly construed as incorporating the Far Eastern (Note: Comprising East and Southeast Asia, although sometimes South Asia is included as well.) parts of Asia, or more broadly, it can incorporate much of Eurasia, including regions such as Eastern Europe, the former Soviet Union or Eastern Bloc, and the Middle East. Because of the ambiguity in defining the term, sometimes this region is also referred to as the Global Easts. The term can also refer to the impact of eastern regions of the world on the broader world through diasporic and other relationships.

The Global East is considered to have features of both the Global North and Global South, being sometimes referred to as a liminal space between the two. A major theme in parts of the Global East is postsocialism.

== See also ==
- Old World
- Eurasianism
- Eastern world
- Global Southeast
- Global Northwest
