= Global Northwest =

Northwestern region of the world

The Global Northwest in 1996 according to Samuel Huntington.

The Global Northwest constitutes Europe (sometimes considered to only include Western Europe) and the Western countries of North America with Western countries in Oceania sometimes included.

Much of modern scholarship around various topics has centered on the Global Northwest, to the detriment of understanding other parts of the world.

== See also ==
=== Other global regions ===
- Global North and Global South
- Global East

=== Subregions ===
- North Atlantic
  - NATO

=== Nearby regions ===
- Global Southeast, to the southwest of North America

=== Intersecting regions ===
- North Pacific, intersecting with the west of North America
- Global Southwest, intersecting with the south of North America
