= Ronald Findlay =

American economist (1935–2021)

Ronald E. Findlay
- Born: April 12, 1935; Rangoon, Burma
- Died: October 8, 2021 (aged 86); Austin, Texas, U.S.

Academic background
- Education: Rangoon University (BA); Massachusetts Institute of Technology (PhD)
- Doctoral advisor: Robert M. Solow
- Website: Information at IDEAS / RePEc

Ronald Edsel Findlay (April 12, 1935 – October 8, 2021) was an American economist and trade theorist. He served as the Ragnar Nurkse Professor of Economics at Columbia University.

He was born in 1935 in Rangoon, then in British Burma. He and his family fled on foot from Burma to India during World War II.

He received a BA from Rangoon University in 1954, and a PhD from MIT in 1960, where his doctoral dissertation was supervised by Robert Solow. He began his career as an economist at Rangoon University, first as a tutor (1954–57), then as a lecturer (1960–66), and finally as a research professor (1966–68).

He joined Columbia in 1969, initially as a visiting professor, before being appointed a professor in 1970. His research focused on international trade and economic development, and he took what has been described as a perspective centred around political economy. He helped theorise the North-South model of international trade. He became a U.S. citizen in 1976.

Findlay died on October 8, 2021, at the age of 86.

== Selected publications ==
Selected publications include:

- with Kevin H. O'Rourke, 2007, "Power and Plenty: Trade, War, and the World Economy in the Second Millennium", Princeton University Press
- with Ronald W. Jones, 2001, "Input Trade and the Location of Production", The American Economic Review
- 1996 "Modeling Global Interdependence: Centers, Peripheries, and Frontiers", The American Economic Review
- with Richard Clarida, 1992, "Government, Trade, and Comparative Advantage", The American Economic Review (1992);
- 1992 "The Roots of Divergence: Western Economic History in Comparative Perspective", The American Economic Review
- with Stanislaw Wellisz, 1988, "The State and the Invisible Hand", World Bank Research Observer
- 1984 "Trade and Development: Theory and Asian Experience", Asian Development Review, Vol 2, No. 2
- An "Austrian" Model of International Trade and Interest Rate Equalization, in Journal of Political Economy

== See also ==
- North–South model
