= Eastern world =

Countries predominantly situated in Asia

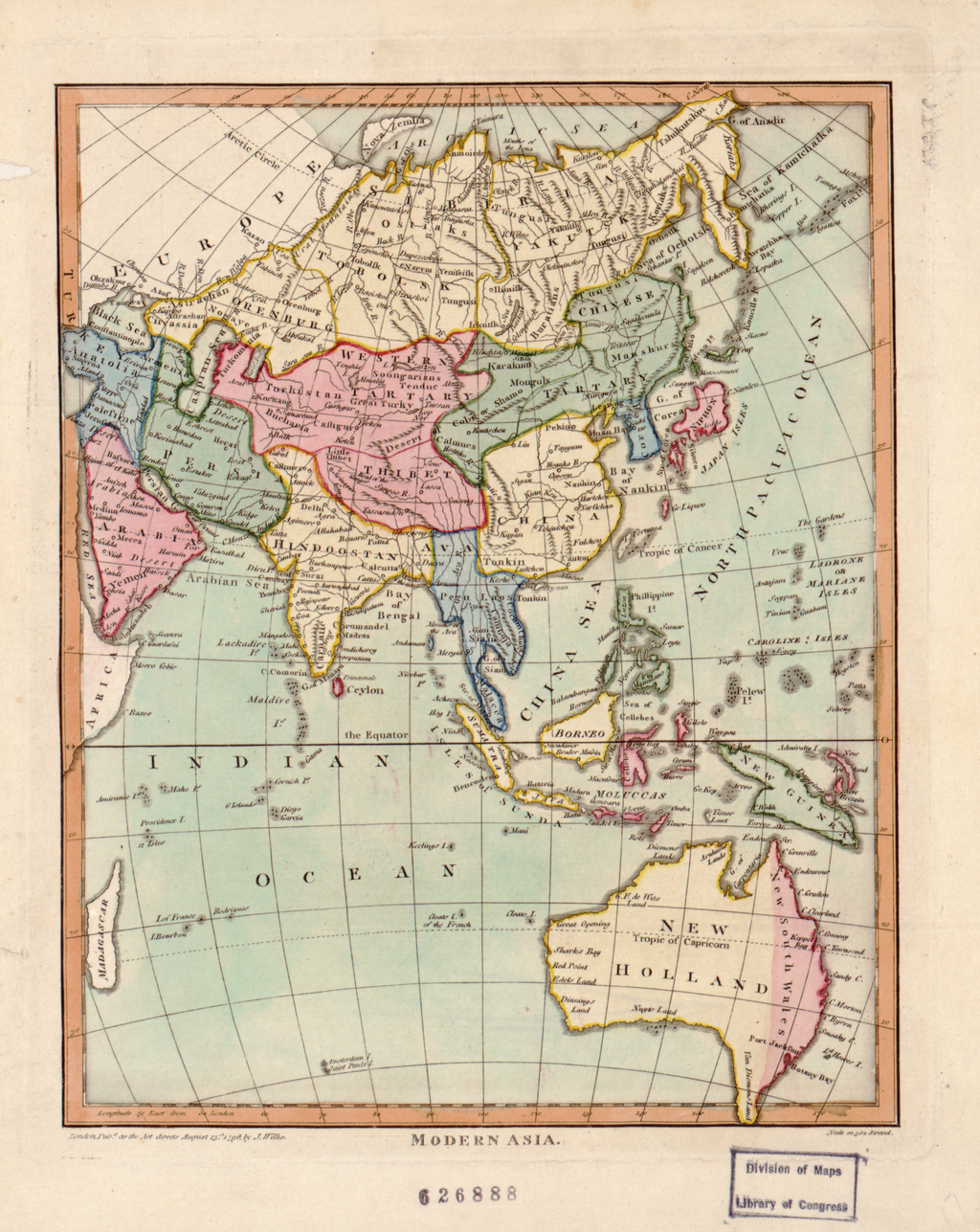
The Eastern world in a 1796 map, which included the continents of Asia and Australia (then known as New Holland).

The Eastern world, also known as the East or historically the Orient, is an umbrella term for various cultures or social structures, nations and philosophical systems, which vary depending on the context. It most often includes Asia, the Mediterranean region and the Arab world, specifically in historical (pre-modern) contexts, and in modern times in the context of Orientalism. The Eastern world is often seen as a counterpart to the Western world.

The various regions included in the term are varied, hard to generalize, and do not have a single shared common heritage. Although the various parts of the Eastern world share many common threads, most notably being in the "Global South", they have never historically defined themselves collectively. The term originally had a literal geographic meaning, referring to the eastern part of the Old World, contrasting the cultures and civilizations of Asia with those of Western Europe (or the Western world).

Conceptually, the boundary between east and west is more cultural and historical, rather than geographical, as a result of which Australia and New Zealand, which were founded as British settler colonies, are typically grouped with the Western world despite being geographically closer to the Eastern world, while the Central Asian nations of the former Soviet Union are grouped in the East. Other than much of Asia and Africa, Western Europe has absorbed almost all of the societies of the Americas, and Oceania into the Western world because of settler colonialism.

Countries such as the Philippines, which are geographically located in the Eastern world, may be considered Western in some aspects of their society, culture and politics due to immigration and historical cultural influences from the United States and Western Europe.

== Overview ==
As with other regions of the world, Asia consists of many different, extremely diverse countries, ethnic groups and cultures. This concept is further debated because in some English-speaking countries, common vernacular associates the "Asian" identity to people of East Asian origin and Southeast Asian origin, while in some countries the "Asian" identity is associated with people of South Asian origin, and in other contexts, Asian regions such as the Indian subcontinent are included with East Asia. West Asia (which includes Israel, part of the Arab world, Iran, etc.), which may or may not see themselves part of the Eastern world, are sometimes considered "Middle Eastern" and separate from Asia.

The division between 'East' and 'West', formerly referred to as Orient and Occident, is a product of European cultural history and of the distinction between Christian Europe and the cultures beyond it to the East. With the European colonization of the Americas, the East-West dichotomy became global. The concept of an Eastern, "Indian" (Indies) or "Oriental" sphere was emphasized by ideas of racial as well as religious and cultural differences. Such distinctions were articulated by Westerners in the scholarly tradition known as Orientalism, which is notable in being a Western conception of a unified Eastern world not limited to any specific region(s), but rather all of Asia together.

== Culture ==
Eastern culture, also known as Eastern civilization, Asian civilization, Oriental culture, Eastern society, or simply the East, refers to the internally diverse culture of the Eastern world. The term "Eastern" encompasses the social norms, ethical values, traditional customs, belief systems, political systems, artifacts and technologies primarily rooted in Asian history. There are subgroups within Eastern culture, such as countries within East Asia, Southeast Asia, or South Asia, as well as syncretism within these regions. These include the spread of Eastern religions such as Buddhism or Hinduism, the usage of Chinese characters or Brahmic scripts, language families, the fusion of cuisines, and traditions, among others.

== See also ==
- Arab world
- Asia-Pacific
- Buddhism by country
- Byzantine commonwealth
- Christendom
- Continental union
- East Asian cultural sphere
- East–West dichotomy
- Far East
- Globalization
- Global East
- Global North and Global South
- Greater India
- Greater Iran
- Greater Middle East
- Hinduism by country
- Muslim world
- Near East
- Western world
- Westernization
