= North–South model =

North south Model

The North–South model, developed largely by Columbia University economics professor Ronald Findlay, is a model in developmental economics that explains the growth of a less developed "South" or "periphery" economy that interacts through trade with a more developed "North" or "core" economy. The North–South model is used by dependencia theorists as a theoretical economic justification for dependency theory.

== Assumptions ==
The model makes a few critical assumptions about the North and the South, as well as the relationship between the two.

- The Northern economy is operating under Solow-Swan assumptions while the Southern economy is operating under Lewis growth assumptions. However, for the purposes of simplicity of this model, the output of the traditional sector of the Lewis model is ignored, and we equate output in the modern sector of the South to total output of the South.
- The more developed North produces manufactured goods while the less developed South produces primary goods. These are the only two goods.
- Both economies undergo complete specialization
- There are no barriers to trade, and only two trading partners
- Income elasticity of demand equals unity in both countries, so economic growth results in a proportionate growth in demand.
- The South depends on the imported goods from the North in order to produce its own goods. This is because the heavy machinery required for production of primary products comes only from the North. The relationship is nonreciprocal, however; the North does not depend on the South, since it can use its own heavy machinery to produce manufactured goods.

== Theory ==
The North–South model begins by defining the relevant equations for the economies of each country, and concludes that the growth rate of the South is locked by the growth rate of the North. This conclusion relies heavily on an analysis of the terms of trade between the two countries; i.e., the price ratio between manufactures and primary products. The terms of trade, $\theta$, are defined as

$\theta = \frac{price\,of\,primary\,products}{price\,of\,manufactures}$

To determine equilibrium, we need only to look at the market for one of the goods, as per Walras' law. We consider the market for the South's goods: primary products. The demand for imports, M, from the South is a positive function of per capita consumption in the North and a negative function of the terms of trade, $\theta$, (higher $\theta$ means relative price of primary products is high and less will be demanded). The supply side comes from export of primary products by the South, X, and is a positive function of the terms of trade and the South's aggregate consumption of primary products.

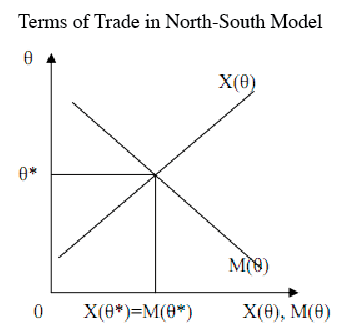

This graph makes it clear that the real terms of trade decreases when the growth rate is higher in the South than in the North (because, thanks to unity in elasticity of demand, the export line would shift to the right faster than the import line). The resultant decrease in the terms of trade, however, means a lower growth rate for the South. This creates a negative feedback cycle in which the growth rate of the South is exogenously determined by that of the North. Note that the growth rate of the north, g_{n}, is equal to n + m, where n is population growth and m is growth of labor-augmenting technical progress, as per the Solow-Swan model.

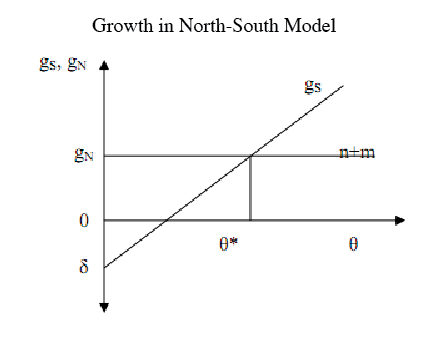

The conclusion, which fits in with dependency theory, is that the South can never grow faster than the North, and thus will never catch up.

== Relationship to import substitution theories ==
Economic theories such as the North–South model have been used to justify arguments for import substitution. Under this theory, less developed countries should use barriers to trade such as protective tariffs to shelter their industries from foreign competition and allow them to grow to the point where they will be able to compete globally.

The North–South model only applies to countries that are completely specialized; that is, they are not competing with foreign markets – they are the only ones producing whichever good they are producing. The way around the terms of trade trap predicted by the North–South model is to produce goods that do compete with foreign goods. For example, the Asian Tigers are famous for pursuing development strategies that involved using their comparative advantage in labor to produce labor-intensive goods like textiles more efficiently than the United States and Europe.

== See also ==
- North–South divide
