= First World =

Geopolitical concept

The concept of the First World was originally one of the "Three Worlds" formed by the global political landscape of the Cold War, as it grouped together those countries that were aligned with the Western Bloc of the United States. This grouping was directly opposed to the Second World, which similarly grouped together those countries that were aligned with the Eastern Bloc of the Soviet Union.

However, after the Cold War ended with the dissolution of the Soviet Union in 1991, the definition largely shifted to instead refer to any politically stable liberal democratic country with strong rule of law, a stable capitalist economy, and a relatively high standard of living. Various ways in which these metrics are assessed are through the examination of a country's GDP, GNP, literacy rate, life expectancy, and Human Development Index. In colloquial usage, "First World" typically refers to "the highly developed industrialized nations often considered the Westernized countries of the world".

== History ==
After World War II, the world split into two large geopolitical blocs, separating into spheres of communism and capitalism. This led to the Cold War, during which the term First World was often used because of its political, social, and economic relevance. The term itself was first introduced in the late 1940s by the United Nations. Today, the terms are slightly outdated and have no official definition. However, the "First World" is generally thought of as the capitalist, industrial, wealthy, and developed countries. This definition includes the countries of North America and Western Europe, Japan, South Korea, Australia, and New Zealand. In contemporary society, the First World is viewed as countries that have the most advanced economies, the greatest influence, the highest standards of living, and the greatest technology. After the Cold War, these countries of the First World included member states of NATO, U.S.-aligned states, neutral countries that were developed and industrialized, and the former British Colonies that were considered developed.

According to Nations Online, the member countries of NATO during the Cold War included:

- Belgium, Canada, Denmark, France, Germany, Greece, Iceland, Italy, Luxembourg, the Netherlands, Norway, Portugal, Spain, Turkey, the United Kingdom, and the United States.

The US-aligned states included:

- Israel, Japan, and South Korea.

Former British colonies included:

- Australia and New Zealand.

Neutral and more or less industrialized capitalist countries included:

- Austria, Ireland, Sweden, and Switzerland.

=== Shifting in definitions ===
Since the end of the Cold War, the original definition of the term "First World" is no longer necessarily applicable. There are varying definitions of the First World; however, they follow the same idea. John D. Daniels, past president of the Academy of International Business, defines the First World to be consisting of "high-income industrial countries". Scholar and Professor George J. Bryjak defines the First World to be the "modern, industrial, capitalist countries of North America and Europe". L. Robert Kohls, former director of training for the U.S. Information Agency and the Meridian International Center in Washington, D.C., uses First World and "fully developed" as synonyms.

=== Other indicators ===
Varying definitions of the term First World and the uncertainty of the term in today's world leads to different indicators of First World status. In 1945, the United Nations used the terms first, second, third, and fourth worlds to define the relative wealth of nations (although popular use of the term fourth world did not come about until later). There are some references towards culture in the definition. They were defined in terms of Gross National Product (GNP), measured in U.S. dollars, along with other socio-political factors. The first world included the large industrialized, democratic (free elections, etc.) nations. The second world included modern, wealthy, industrialized nations, but they were all under communist control. Most of the rest of the world was deemed part of the third world, while the fourth world was considered to be those nations whose people were living on less than US$100 annually. If we use the term to mean high-income industrialized economies, then the World Bank classifies countries according to their GNI or gross national income per capita. The World Bank separates countries into four categories: high-income, upper-middle-income, lower-middle-income, and low-income economies. The First World is considered to be countries with high-income economies. The high-income economies are equated to mean developed and industrialized countries.

== Three-world model ==
Current NATO member countries

The terms "First World", "Second World", and "Third World" were originally used to divide the world's nations into three categories. The model did not reach its end state all at once. The complete overthrow of the pre–World War II status quo, known as the Cold War, left two superpowers (the United States and the Soviet Union) vying for ultimate global supremacy. They created two camps, known as blocs. These blocs formed the basis of the concepts of the First and Second Worlds.

Early in the Cold War era, NATO and the Warsaw Pact were created by the United States and the Soviet Union, respectively. They were also referred to as the Western Bloc and the Eastern Bloc. The circumstances of these two blocs were so different that they were essentially two worlds, however, they were not numbered first and second. The onset of the Cold War is marked by Winston Churchill's famous "Iron Curtain" speech. In this speech, Churchill describes the division of the West and East to be so solid that it could be called an iron curtain.

In 1952, the French demographer Alfred Sauvy coined the term Third World in reference to the three estates in pre-revolutionary France. The first two estates being the nobility and clergy and everybody else comprising the third estate. He compared the capitalist world (i.e., First World) to the nobility and the communist world (i.e., Second World) to the clergy. Just as the third estate comprised everybody else, Sauvy called the Third World all the countries that were not in this Cold War division, i.e., the unaligned and uninvolved states in the "East-West Conflict". With the coining of the term Third World directly, the first two groups came to be known as the "First World" and "Second World" respectively. Here the three-world system emerged.

=== Post–Cold War ===
With the fall of the Soviet Union in 1991, the Eastern Bloc ceased to exist and with it, the perfect applicability of the term Second World. The definitions of the First World, Second World, and Third World changed slightly, yet generally describe the same concepts.

== Relationships with the other worlds ==
=== Historic ===
During the Cold War era, the relationships between the First World, Second World and the Third World were very rigid. The First World and Second World were at constant odds with one another via the tensions between their two cores, the United States and the Soviet Union, respectively. The Cold War, as its name suggests, was a primarily ideological struggle between the First and Second Worlds, or more specifically, the U.S. and the Soviet Union. Multiple doctrines and plans dominated Cold War dynamics including the Truman Doctrine and Marshall Plan (from the U.S.) and the Molotov Plan (from the Soviet Union). The extent of the tension between the two worlds was evident in Berlin -- which was then split into East and West. To stop citizens in East Berlin from having too much exposure to the capitalist West, the Soviet Union erected the Berlin Wall within the city.

The relationship between the First World and the Third World is characterized by the very definition of the Third World. Because countries of the Third World were noncommittal and non-aligned with both the First World and the Second World, they were targets for recruitment. In the quest for expanding their sphere of influence, the United States (core of the First World) tried to establish pro-U.S. regimes in the Third World. In addition, because the Soviet Union (core of the Second World) also wanted to expand, the Third World often became a site for conflict.

The Domino Theory

Some examples include Vietnam and Korea. Success lay with the First World if at the end of the war, the country became capitalistic and democratic, and with the Second World, if the country became communist. While Vietnam as a whole was eventually communized, only the northern half of Korea remained communist. The Domino Theory largely governed United States policy regarding the Third World and their rivalry with the Second World. In light of the Domino Theory, the U.S. saw winning the proxy wars in the Third World as a measure of the "credibility of U.S. commitments all over the world".

=== Present ===
The movement of people and information largely characterizes the inter-world relationships in the present day. A majority of breakthroughs and innovation originate in Western Europe and the U.S. and later their effects permeate globally. As judged by the Wharton School of Business at the University of Pennsylvania, most of the Top 30 Innovations of the Last 30 Years were from former First World countries (e.g., the U.S. and countries in Western Europe).

The disparity between knowledge in the First World as compared to the Third World is evident in healthcare and medical advancements. Deaths from water-related illnesses have largely been eliminated in "wealthier nations", while they are still a "major concern in the developing world". Widely treatable diseases in the developed countries of the First World, malaria and tuberculosis needlessly claim many lives in the developing countries of the Third World. Each year 900,000 people die from malaria and combating the disease accounts for 40% of health spending in many African countries.

The International Corporation for Assigned Names and Numbers (ICANN) announced that the first Internationalized Domain Names (IDNs) would be available in the summer of 2010. These include non-Latin domains such as Chinese, Arabic, and Russian. This is one way that the flow of information between the First and Third Worlds may become more even.

The movement of information and technology from the First World to various Third World countries has created a general "aspir(ation) to First World living standards". The Third World has lower living standards as compared to the First World. Information about the comparatively higher living standards of the First World comes through television, commercial advertisements and foreign visitors to their countries. This exposure causes two changes: a) living standards in some Third World countries rise and b) this exposure creates hopes and many from Third World countries emigrate—both legally and illegally—to these First World countries in hopes of attaining that living standard and prosperity. In fact, this emigration is the "main contributor to the increasing populations of U.S. and Europe". While these emigrations have greatly contributed to globalization, they have also precipitated trends like brain drain and problems with repatriation. They have also created immigration and governmental burden problems for the countries (i.e., First World) that people emigrate to.

=== Environmental footprint ===
Some have argued that the most important human population problem for the world is not the high rate of population increase in certain Third World countries per se, but rather the "increase in total human impact". The per-capita footprint—the resources consumed and the waste created by each person—varies globally. The highest per-person impact occurs in the First World and the lowest in the Third World: each inhabitant of the United States, Western Europe and Japan consumes 32 times as many resources and puts out 32 times as much waste as each person in the Third World. However, China leads the world in total emissions, but its large population skews its per-capita statistic lower than those of more developed nations.

As large consumers of fossil fuels, First World countries drew attention to environmental pollution. The Kyoto Protocol is a treaty that is based on the United Nations Framework Convention on Climate Change, which was finalized in 1992 at the Earth Summit in Rio. It proposed to place the burden of protecting the climate on the United States and other First World countries. Countries that were considered to be developing, such as China and India, were not required to approve the treaty because they were more concerned that restricting emissions would further restrain their development.

=== International relations ===
Until the recent past, little attention was paid to the interests of Third World countries. This is because most international relations scholars have come from the industrialized, First World nations. As more countries have continued to become more developed, the interests of the world have slowly started to shift. However, First World nations still have many more universities, professors, journals, and conferences, which has made it very difficult for Third World countries to gain legitimacy and respect with their new ideas and methods of looking at the world.

=== Development theory ===
During the Cold War, the modernization theory and development theory developed in Europe as a result of their economic, political, social, and cultural response to the management of former colonial territories. European scholars and practitioners of international politics hoped to theorize ideas and then create policies based on those ideas that would cause newly independent colonies to change into politically developed sovereign nation-states. However, most of the theorists were from the United States, and they were not interested in Third World countries achieving development by any model. They wanted those countries to develop through liberal processes of politics, economics, and socialization; that is to say, they wanted them to follow the liberal capitalist example of a so-called "First World state". Therefore, the modernization and development tradition consciously originated as a (mostly U.S.) alternative to the Marxist and neo-Marxist strategies promoted by the "Second World states" like the Soviet Union. It was used to explain how developing Third World states would naturally evolve into developed First World States, and it was partially grounded in liberal economic theory and a form of Talcott Parsons' sociological theory.

== Globalization ==
The United Nations's ESCWA has written that globalization "is a widely-used term that can be defined in a number of different ways". Joyce Osland from San Jose State University wrote: "Globalization has become an increasingly controversial topic, and the growing number of protests around the world has focused more attention on the basic assumptions of globalization and its effects." "Globalization is not new, though. For thousands of years, people—and, later, corporations—have been buying from and selling to each other in lands at great distances, such as through the famed Silk Road across Central Asia that connected China and Europe during the Middle Ages. Likewise, for centuries, people and corporations have invested in enterprises in other countries. In fact, many of the features of the current wave of globalization are similar to those prevailing before the outbreak of the First World War in 1914."

=== European Union ===
The most prominent example of globalization in the first world is the European Union (EU). The European Union is an agreement in which countries voluntarily decide to build common governmental institutions to which they delegate some individual national sovereignty so that decisions can be made democratically on a higher level of common interest for Europe as a whole. The result is a union of 27 Member States covering 4,233,255.3 square kilometres (1,634,469.0 sq mi) with roughly 450 million people. In total, the European Union produces almost a third of the world's gross national product and the member states speak more than 23 languages. All of the European Union countries are joined together by a hope to promote and extend peace, democracy, cooperativeness, stability, prosperity, and the rule of law. In a 2007 speech, Benita Ferrero-Waldner, the European Commissioner for External Relations, said, "The future of the EU is linked to globalization...the EU has a crucial role to play in making globalization work properly...". In a 2014 speech at the European Parliament, the Italian PM Matteo Renzi stated, "We are the ones who can bring civilization to globalization".

Just as the concept of the First World came about as a result of World War II, so did the European Union. In 1951 the beginnings of the EU were founded with the creation of European Coal and Steel Community (ECSC). From the beginning of its inception, countries in the EU were judged by many standards, including economic ones. This is where the relation between globalization, the EU, and First World countries arises. Especially during the 1990s when the EU focused on economic policies such as the creation and circulation of the Euro, the creation of the European Monetary Institute, and the opening of the European Central Bank.

In 1993, at the Copenhagen European Council, the European Union took a decisive step towards expanding the EU, what they called the Fifth Enlargement, agreeing that "the associated countries in Central and Eastern Europe that so desire shall become members of the European Union". Thus, enlargement was no longer a question of if, but when and how. The European Council stated that accession could occur when the prospective country is able to assume the obligations of membership, that is that all the economic and political conditions required are attained. Furthermore, it defined the membership criteria, which are regarded as the Copenhagen criteria, as follows:

- stability of institutions guaranteeing democracy, the rule of law, human rights and respect for and protection of minorities
- the existence of a functioning market economy as well as the capacity to cope with competitive pressure and market forces within the Union
- the ability to take on the obligations of membership including adherence to the aims of political, economic and monetary union

It is clear that all these criteria are characteristics of developed countries. Therefore, there is a direct link between globalization, developed nations, and the European Union.

=== Multinational corporations ===
A majority of multinational corporations find their origins in First World countries. After the collapse of the Soviet Union, multinational corporations proliferated as more countries focused on global trade. The series of General Agreement on Tariffs and Trade (GATT) and later the World Trade Organization (WTO) essentially ended the protectionist measures that were dissuading global trade. The eradication of these protectionist measures, while creating avenues for economic interconnection, mostly benefited developed countries, who by using their power at GATT summits, forced developing and underdeveloped countries to open their economies to Western goods.

As the world starts to globalize, it is accompanied by criticism of the current forms of globalization, which are feared to be overly corporate-led. As corporations become larger and multinational, their influence and interests go further accordingly. Being able to influence and own most media companies, it is hard to be able to publicly debate the notions and ideals that corporations pursue. Some choices that corporations take to make profits can affect people all over the world. Sometimes fatally.

The third industrial revolution is spreading to many countries of the developing world. To participate in this new global economy, developing countries should possess characteristics that can attract multinational corporations to establish offshore production bases. To become such bases, developing countries must provide an educated workforce, good infrastructure (electricity, telecommunications, transportation), political stability, and a willingness to follow market rules.

If these conditions are in place, multinational corporations will transfer via their offshore subsidiaries or to their offshore suppliers, the specific production technologies and market linkages necessary to participate in the global economy. By themselves, developing countries, even if well-educated, cannot produce at the quality levels demanded in high-value-added industries and cannot market what they produce even in low-value-added industries such as textiles or shoes. Put bluntly, multinational companies possess a variety of factors that developing countries must have if they are to participate in the global economy.

=== Outsourcing ===
Outsourcing, according to Grossman and Helpman, refers to the process of "subcontracting an ever expanding set of activities, ranging from product design to assembly, from research and development to marketing, distribution and after-sales service". Many companies have moved to outsourcing services in which they no longer specifically need or have the capability of handling themselves. This is due to considerations of what the companies can have more control over. Whatever companies tend to not have much control over or need to have control over will outsource activities to firms that they consider "less competing". According to SourcingMag.com, the process of outsourcing can take the following four phases.

1. strategic thinking
2. evaluation and selection
3. contract development
4. outsourcing management

Outsourcing is among some of the many reasons for increased competition within developing countries. Aside from being a reason for competition, many First World countries see outsourcing, in particular offshore outsourcing, as an opportunity for increased income. As a consequence, the skill level of production in foreign countries handling the outsourced services increases within the economy; and the skill level within the domestic developing countries can decrease. It is because of competition (including outsourcing) that Robert Feenstra and Gordon Hanson predict that there will be a rise of 15–33 percent in inequality amongst these countries.

== See also ==
- Developed country
- Developing country
- Digital divide
- East–West dichotomy
- First World privilege
- First World problem
- Fourth World
- Global North and Global South
- Globalization
- List of countries by total wealth
- Multinational corporation
- Second World
- Third World
- Three-world model
- World-systems theory
