= Western Bloc =

Group of states aligned with the United States during the Cold War

Political situation in Europe during the Cold War

The Western Bloc, also known as the Capitalist Bloc, the Freedom Bloc, the Free Bloc, and the American Bloc, was an unofficial coalition of countries that were officially allied with the United States during the Cold War (1947–1991). While the NATO member states, in Western Europe and Northern America, were pivotal to the bloc, it included many other countries in the broader Asia-Pacific region, the Middle East, Latin America, and Africa with histories of anti-Soviet, anti-communist and, in some cases anti-socialist, ideologies and policies.

As such, the bloc was opposed to the political systems and foreign policies of communist countries, which were centered on the Soviet Union, other members of the Warsaw Pact, and usually the People's Republic of China. The name "Western Bloc" emerged in response to and as the antithesis of its communist counterpart, the Eastern Bloc. Throughout the Cold War, the governments and the Western media were more inclined to refer to themselves as the "Free World" or the "First World", whereas the Eastern bloc was often referred to as the "Communist World" or less commonly the "Second World".

== Terminology ==
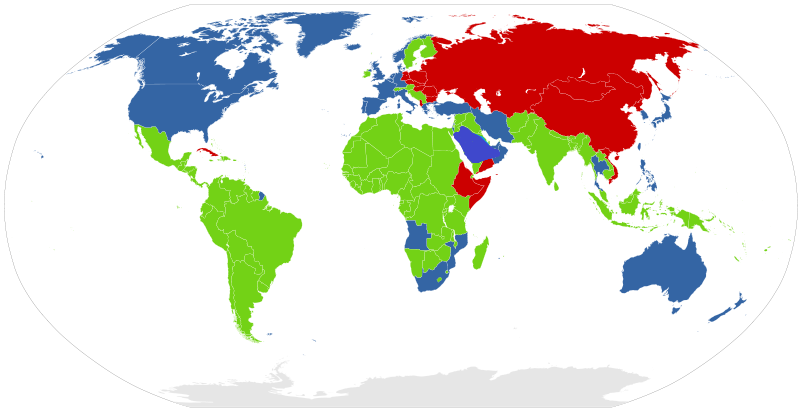
Cold War military alliances in 1975: NATO and aligned countries (blue) and Warsaw Pact and communist countries (red)

The term Western Bloc refers to the group of countries aligned politically, economically, and militarily with the United States during the Cold War. These countries opposed the Eastern Bloc led by the Soviet Union and generally embraced capitalism, liberal democracy, and anti-communism. The Western Bloc was mainly composed of NATO member states, the European Union, and other allied countries across the globe.

The term Free World was frequently used in U.S. and allied rhetoric to describe the bloc of countries that upheld democratic governance and market economies, contrasting them with the one-party authoritarian states of the Eastern Bloc. This term became prominent in political and media discourse during the Cold War, especially in the context of framing the ideological struggle between democracy and communism. The Free World concept was also invoked to justify military interventions, such as the Korean War and the Vietnam War, under the belief that the West needed to defend its values against communist expansion.

The term First World was another geopolitical term used during the Cold War to classify countries aligned with NATO and the capitalist economic model. This term contrasted the First World with the Second World, which referred to Soviet-aligned communist states, and the Third World, which consisted of non-aligned or developing nations. The categorization was not only political but also economic, with First World countries generally characterized by industrial economies and relatively high standards of living.

Another common term was the Capitalist Bloc, which emphasized the Western Bloc's economic orientation toward private property, free markets, and limited government intervention. It was often used by Soviet propaganda to criticize the economic disparities and capitalist exploitation prevalent in Western societies. From the Western perspective, however, the Capitalist Bloc was seen as a defense of free-market economies and private property rights.

The phrase Democratic West was used to emphasize the political systems of the Western Bloc, which were generally characterized by multiparty democratic systems, free elections, and the rule of law. This contrasted with the authoritarian and totalitarian systems in the Eastern Bloc. The concept of the Democratic West was a critical component of Western Cold War rhetoric, as it highlighted the ideological divide between the democratic, capitalist societies of the West and the communist, one-party states of the East. It was frequently invoked to justify the establishment of political, military, and economic alliances like NATO and the European Economic Community (EEC).

These terms—Western Bloc, Free World, First World, Capitalist Bloc, and Democratic West—were often used interchangeably but carried different nuances depending on the context. They were central to the ideological battle of the Cold War, where both blocs used language to define the moral and political contours of the global struggle.

In addition to the formal political and economic terms, other rhetoric such as the West and the Atlantic Alliance was used to define the broader cultural-political unity of the countries in the Western Bloc. These terms were often employed in discussions of transatlantic unity, emphasizing the shared values and common interests of Western countries, particularly in opposition to the Eastern Bloc.

The end of the Cold War and the dissolution of the Soviet Union in 1991 saw a decline in the use of terms like "Western Bloc" as the world moved towards a unipolar system dominated by the United States. However, terms such as "the West" and "liberal international order" continue to be relevant in current geopolitical discourse, especially in discussions surrounding NATO, the European Union, and Western-led global institutions.

The "Iron Curtain" division of Europe, highlighting the split between Western and Eastern Blocs

Overall, the terminology of the Western Bloc served not only as a means of political classification but also as a tool in shaping public opinion and justifying foreign policy decisions throughout the Cold War. These terms played an integral role in how the world viewed itself and the ideological battle between democracy and communism that defined the era.

== List of states: 1947–1991 Western Bloc associations ==
=== NATO ===
- Belgium*
- Canada*
- Denmark*
- France*
- West Germany* (from 1955)
- Greece* (from 1952)
- Iceland*
- Italy*
- Luxembourg*
- Netherlands*
- Norway*
- Portugal*
- Spain* (from 1982)
- Turkey* (from 1952)
- United Kingdom*
- United States*

* Indicates founding member state

=== Five Eyes and ANZUS ===
- Australia
- Canada
- New Zealand
- United Kingdom
- United States

=== Anti-Soviet communist or socialist states (until 1975) ===
- China (until 1962)
- Democratic Kampuchea (until 1973)
  - Coalition Government of Democratic Kampuchea (until 1975)
- Socialist Republic of Romania (until 1950)
- Socialist Federal Republic of Yugoslavia (until 1958)
- Somali Democratic Republic (until 1977)

Map of SEATO members in 1959, shown in blue

=== Compact of Free Association ===
- Marshall Islands
- Micronesia
- Palau
- United States

=== METO, Baghdad Pact, CENTO (until 1979) ===
- Pahlavi Iran (until 1979)
- Kingdom of Iraq (until 1958)
- Pakistan (until 1979)
- Turkey (until 1979)
- United Kingdom (until 1979)

=== SEATO (until 1977) ===
- Australia
- Kingdom of Cambodia (until 1970)
  - Khmer Republic (1970–1975)
- France
- Kingdom of Laos (until 1975)
- New Zealand
- Pakistan
- Philippines
- South Vietnam (until 1975)
- Thailand
- United Kingdom
- United States

=== Latin America and the Caribbean ===
- Antigua and Barbuda
- Argentina
- Bahamas (from 1982)
- Barbados
- Belize
- Bolivia
- Brazil
- Chile
- Colombia
- Costa Rica
- Cuba (until 1959)
- Dominica
- Dominican Republic (until 1990)
- Ecuador
- El Salvador
- Grenada (1974-1979)
- Guatemala
- Guyana (1966–1980)
- Haiti (Until 1957)
  - Duvalier Haiti (1957–1986)
- Honduras
- Jamaica
- Mexico
- Nicaragua (until 1979)
- Panama (Until 1968) (1982-1987) (from 1990)
- Paraguay
- Peru (until 1968) (1975-1991)
- Saint Kitts and Nevis
- Saint Lucia
- Saint Vincent and the Grenadines
- Suriname (1975-1980) (1987-1990) (Sep 16 1991-1991)
- Trinidad and Tobago (from 1967)
- Uruguay
- Venezuela

=== Middle East/North Africa ===
- Bahrain
- Kingdom of Egypt (until 1952)
  - Egypt (from 1974)
- Pahlavi Iran (until 1979)
- Kingdom of Iraq (until 1958)
  - Republic of Iraq (Feb 10 1963-Nov 18)
    - Ba'athist Iraq (1979-1990)
- Israel
- Jordan
- Kuwait
- Lebanon
- Kingdom of Libya (until 1969)
- Mauritania (1984-1991)
- Morocco
- Oman
- Qatar
- Saudi Arabia
- Republic of Sudan (1956-1969)
  - Sudan (1971-1989)
- Syria (1946-1957) (1961-1963)
- Tunisia (1976-1991)
- United Arab Emirates
- Yemen Arab Republic (1970–1974) (1978-1990)
  - Kingdom of Yemen (Until 1970)

=== East and South Asia ===
- Republic of Afghanistan (1973–1978)
  - Kingdom of Afghanistan (1947–1973)
- Bangladesh (1975–1991)
- Bhutan
- Brunei (from 1984)
- Kingdom of Cambodia (1953–1970)
  - Khmer Republic (1970–1975)
- Indonesia
- Japan
- South Korea
- China (1979–1989)
- Kingdom of Laos (1947–1975)
- Maldives
- Malaysia
- Nepal
- Pakistan
- Philippines
- Singapore
- South Vietnam (1955–1975)
  - State of Vietnam (1948–1955)
- Sri Lanka
- Taiwan
- Thailand
- Tibet (1947-1951)

=== Oceania ===
- Australia
- Fiji
- Kiribati
- Marshall Islands
- Micronesia
- Nauru
- New Zealand
- Palau
- Papua New Guinea
- Samoa
- Solomon Islands
- Tonga
- Tuvalu
- Vanuatu

=== Sub-Saharan Africa ===
- Botswana
- Cameroon
- Central African Republic
- Chad (1960–1979; 1982–1991)
- Comoros (1978–1991)
- Republic of the Congo (1960–1969)
- Dahomey (1960–1975)
- Equatorial Guinea (1980–1991)
- Djibouti (1977-1981)
- Gabon
- Gambia
- Ghana (1966–1979)
- Guinea (1984–1991)
- Ethiopian Empire (until 1974)
- Ivory Coast
- Kenya
- Lesotho
- Eswatini
- Liberia
- Rhodesia (1965-1979)
- Rwanda
- Madagascar (1960–1975)
- Malawi
- Mauritius
- Niger
- Nigeria
- Senegal
- Seychelles (1976–1977)
- Sierra Leone
- Somali Democratic Republic (from 1977)
  - Somali Republic (1960–1969)
- South Africa
- Togo
- Sovereign State of Uganda (1963-1966)
  - Second Republic of Uganda (1971-1973) (1976-1979)
    - Third Republic of Uganda (1980-1983) (1985-1986)
- Burkina Faso (1987–1991)
  - Upper Volta (1960–1984)
- Zaire
  - Republic of the Congo (Léopoldville) (1960-1971)

=== Others ===
- Cyprus
- Ireland
- Switzerland
- Andorra
- San Marino
- Liechtenstein
- Monaco
- Vatican City
- Malta

== List of states: Post-1991 Western-aligned associations ==
=== NATO ===
- Albania (from 2009)
- Belgium*
- Bulgaria (from 2004)
- Canada*
- Croatia (from 2009)
- Czech Republic (from 1999)
- Denmark*
- Estonia (from 2004)
- Finland (from 2023)
- France*
- Germany*
- Greece*
- Hungary (from 1999)
- Iceland*
- Italy*
- Latvia (from 2004)
- Lithuania (from 2004)
- Luxembourg*
- Montenegro (from 2017)
- Netherlands*
- North Macedonia (from 2020)
- Norway*
- Poland (from 1999)
- Portugal*
- Romania (from 2004)
- Slovakia (from 2004)
- Slovenia (from 2004)
- Spain*
- Sweden (from 2024)
- Turkey*
- United Kingdom*
- United States*

* Indicates pre-1991 member state

=== Major non-NATO ally (MNNAs) ===
- Australia (from 1987)
- Egypt (from 1987)
- Israel (from 1987)
- Japan (from 1987)
- South Korea (from 1987)
- Jordan (from 1996)
- New Zealand (from 1997)
- Argentina (from 1998)
- Bahrain (from 2002)
- Philippines (from 2003)
- Thailand (from 2003)
- Republic of China (Taiwan) (de facto, from 2003)
- Kuwait (from 2004)
- Morocco (from 2004)
- Pakistan (from 2004)
- Islamic Republic of Afghanistan (2012–2021)
- Tunisia (from 2015)
- Brazil (from 2019)
- Colombia (from 2022)
- Qatar (from 2022)
- Kenya (from 2024)
- Saudi Arabia (from 2026)
- Peru (from 2026)

=== Middle East and Africa Partners ===
- Bahrain
- Benin
- Botswana
- Burkina Faso (1991–2021)
- Burundi
- Cape Verde
- Cameroon
- Central African Republic
- Chad
- Comoros
- Democratic Republic of the Congo
- Republic of the Congo
- Egypt
- Eswatini
- Gabon
- Gambia
- Ghana
- Guinea (1991–2021)
- Guinea-Bissau
- Iraq (from 2004)
- Israel
- Ivory Coast
- Jordan
- Kenya
- Kuwait
- Lebanon
- Lesotho
- Liberia
- Libya (from 2011)
- Malawi
- Mali (1991–2021)
- Mauritania
- Mauritius
- Morocco
- Niger (1991–2023)
- Nigeria
- Oman
- Palestine (until 2023)
- Qatar
- Rwanda
- São Tomé and Príncipe
- Saudi Arabia
- Senegal
- Seychelles
- Sierra Leone
- Somalia
- South Africa
- South Sudan (from 2011)
- Sudan (2019–2021)
- Syria (from 2024)
- Togo
- Tunisia
- Uganda
- United Arab Emirates
- Yemen (Hadi government)

=== Asia-Pacific and Oceania Partners ===
- Islamic Republic of Afghanistan (2001–2021)
  - Islamic State of Afghanistan (1992–1996)
- Australia
- Bangladesh
- Bhutan
- Brunei
- Cambodia
- Fiji
- India
- Indonesia
- Japan
- Kiribati
- South Korea
- Malaysia
- Maldives
- Marshall Islands
- Federated States of Micronesia
- Mongolia (until 2025)
- Nauru
- New Zealand
- Pakistan
- Palau
- Papua New Guinea
- Philippines
- Republic of China (Taiwan) (de facto)
- Samoa
- Singapore
- Solomon Islands
- Sri Lanka
- Thailand
- Tonga
- Tuvalu
- Vanuatu
- Vietnam (until 2026)

=== Inter-American Partners ===
- Antigua and Barbuda
- Argentina
- Bahamas
- Barbados
- Belize
- Bolivia
- Brazil
- Chile
- Colombia
- Costa Rica
- Dominica
- Dominican Republic
- Ecuador
- El Salvador
- Grenada (from 1983)
- Guatemala
- Guyana
- Honduras
- Jamaica
- Mexico
- Panama
- Paraguay
- Peru
- Saint Kitts and Nevis
- Saint Lucia
- Saint Vincent and the Grenadines
- Suriname
- Uruguay
- Trinidad and Tobago
- Venezuela (until 1999)

=== Pacific Squad, G7, C12, and Quadrilateral Security Dialogue ===
- Australia
- Brazil
- Canada
- France
- Germany
- India
- Italy
- Japan
- South Korea
- Mexico
- United Kingdom
- United States

=== Others ===
- Armenia (since 2023)
- Azerbaijan (until 2020)
- Austria
- Andorra
- Bosnia and Herzegovina
- Cyprus
- Georgia
- Ireland
- Kosovo
- Liechtenstein
- Malta
- Moldova
- Monaco
- Ukraine (since 2014)
- San Marino
- Switzerland

== Foundation history ==
The Western Bloc (Note: Also referred to as the "Capitalist Bloc" or "Free World" during the Cold War.) was a coalition of Western-aligned nations formed during the early Cold War to counter the geopolitical influence of the Soviet Union and the spread of communism. It was primarily led by the United States and included countries with market economies and liberal-democratic political systems. The bloc's foundation was laid by the Truman Doctrine (1947), which asserted American support for countries resisting authoritarian and communist pressures, and the Marshall Plan (1948), which provided extensive economic assistance for the reconstruction of Western Europe. These efforts were institutionalized through the formation of the North Atlantic Treaty Organization (NATO) in 1949, which served as the military backbone of the Western alliance system. In Asia, countries such as Japan, South Korea, and Taiwan also aligned with the Western Bloc, supported by bilateral security agreements and substantial U.S. military presence.

=== Post-War Context and the Onset of the Cold War ===
After the end of World War II in 1945, Europe was divided among the Allied powers into zones of occupation. In the subsequent years, the Soviet Union established socialist regimes across Eastern Europe, which increasingly alarmed Western powers. On 5 March 1946, British Prime Minister Winston Churchill delivered his "Iron Curtain" speech in Fulton, Missouri, declaring that an "iron curtain has descended across the Continent."

=== The Truman Doctrine (1947) ===
In March 1947, U.S. President Harry S. Truman announced the Truman Doctrine, pledging military and economic assistance to nations threatened by communist subversion, starting with Greece and Turkey. This policy marked the beginning of the U.S. strategy of containment, which would define Western foreign policy for decades.

=== The Marshall Plan (1948) ===
The Marshall Plan, officially the European Recovery Program, was proposed in June 1947 and enacted in April 1948. It delivered over $13 billion (approximately $150 billion today) in U.S. aid to help Western Europe recover economically and politically from the devastation of World War II. The program also aimed to reduce the appeal of communist parties, particularly in France and Italy.

=== Formation of NATO (1949) ===
On 4 April 1949, twelve countries signed the North Atlantic Treaty, forming the North Atlantic Treaty Organization (NATO). The alliance was based on collective defense—Article 5 of the treaty stated that an attack on one member would be regarded as an attack on all. NATO became the Western Bloc’s primary military alliance during the Cold War.

=== The Soviet Response: The Warsaw Pact (1955) ===
In response to NATO, and particularly the admission of West Germany in 1955, the Soviet Union formed the Warsaw Pact, a military alliance composed of Eastern Bloc socialist republics. This pact formalized the East–West military divide that defined the Cold War period.

== Western Bloc during and after the Cold War ==
The bloc's foundation was laid by the Truman Doctrine (1947), which asserted American support for countries resisting authoritarian and communist pressures, and the Marshall Plan (1948), which provided extensive economic assistance for the reconstruction of Western Europe. These efforts were institutionalized through the formation of the North Atlantic Treaty Organization (NATO) in 1949, which served as the military backbone of the Western alliance system. In Asia, countries such as Japan, South Korea, and Taiwan also aligned with the Western Bloc, supported by bilateral security agreements and a substantial U.S. military presence.

The Western Bloc's geopolitical strategy, known as containment, was designed to limit Soviet expansion through a combination of military alliances, economic assistance, and ideological influence. Western-aligned institutions such as the International Monetary Fund (IMF), the World Bank, and the General Agreement on Tariffs and Trade (GATT) fostered economic stability and integration among bloc members while reinforcing liberal economic norms. These efforts were part of what scholars have described as a form of "informal empire," where the United States exercised global influence not through colonization but through economic, cultural, and military hegemony.

The Western Bloc's dominance extended across Western Europe, parts of East Asia, Latin America, Oceania, and Africa, where it frequently competed with Soviet-aligned movements, particularly during the wave of post-war decolonization. While the bloc was presented as a defender of freedom and democracy, critics have noted its support for authoritarian regimes that were deemed strategically important, such as those in Iran (1953), Chile (1973), and South Vietnam. Some of them gained democracy in the late 1980s, such as Taiwan, South Korea.

Core members of the Western Bloc included:

- The United States
- Canada
- United Kingdom
- France
- West Germany
- Italy
- Japan (post-1952)
- Australia and New Zealand
- Belgium, Netherlands, Luxembourg
- Norway, Denmark, Iceland
- Turkey and Greece (after 1952)
- Republic of China (after 1950)
- Portugal
- South Korea

Most of these countries were members of NATO, formed in 1949 to provide collective defense.

=== Strategic and military alignment ===
The Western Bloc's military strategy centered on containment, a doctrine developed by George F. Kennan to prevent the spread of communism. The Truman Doctrine (1947) formalized U.S. support for nations resisting communist subjugation, beginning with aid to Greece and Turkey.

In 1948, the Marshall Plan allocated over $13 billion to rebuild Western European economies, prevent Soviet influence, and promote U.S. strategic interests.

In Asia, similar principles were applied through the U.S.–Japan Security Treaty (1951), military support to South Korea, and alignment with anti-communist regimes across the Pacific.

=== Economic integration and institutions ===
The Western Bloc promoted economic integration through institutions such as:

- The International Monetary Fund (IMF)
- The World Bank
- The General Agreement on Tariffs and Trade (GATT), precursor to the World Trade Organization (WTO)

These institutions were intended to stabilize the global economy and prevent a repeat of the Great Depression, which was seen as a contributing factor to political extremism.

=== Criticism and debates ===
While the Western Bloc framed itself as a coalition of free nations, it was also criticized for backing authoritarian regimes that opposed communism, such as in Iran (1953), Chile (1973), and South Vietnam.

Historians such as Raymond Aron and John L. Gaddis have described the Western Bloc as a form of "informal empire" or "imperial republic," led by the United States, not through colonization but through military, economic, and cultural dominance. Other scholars, like Odd Arne Westad, have emphasized the ideological and interventionist nature of Western policies in the Global South.

=== Legacy ===
The Western Bloc was instrumental in shaping the post-World War II global order. Its institutions, alliances, and economic models had a lasting influence beyond the Cold War. The collapse of the Soviet Union in 1991 was widely interpreted as a validation of Western capitalist democracy, though newer multipolar dynamics have emerged in the 21st century, it is still evident that international relations are based on the stalemate between the Western bloc and the non-Western bloc.

== See also ==
- List of Western Bloc defectors
  - Martin and Mitchell defection
  - List of American and British defectors in the Korean War
- Allies of World War II
- Axis powers
- Eastern Bloc
- Free World
- First World
- Second World
- Third World
- Operation Condor
- Partnership for Peace
- Western betrayal
- Western European and Others Group

== Sources ==
- Matloff, Maurice. Makers of Modern Strategy. Ed. Peter Paret. Princeton: Princeton UP, 1971. 702.
- Kissinger, Henry. Diplomacy. New York: Simon & Schuster, 1994. 447,454.
- Lewkowicz, Nicolas. The United States, the Soviet Union and the Geopolitical Implications of the Origins of the Cold War New York and London: Anthem Press, 2018.
