= Global Southeast =

Southeastern region of the world

A depiction of the Indosphere, a major region in the southeastern part of the world.

The Global Southeast is the southeastern region of the Eastern Hemisphere. There are varying definitions, with South and Southeast Asia always included, and broader definitions including North Africa and the Middle East. It is becoming an increasingly economically relevant region on the world stage, though it is also projected to have problems with climate change accelerating refugee crises and conflicts in the region.

Many Southeastern countries are undergoing rapid urbanization, and generally have significant amounts of ethnic diversity.

== Relations between Global Northwest and Global Southeast ==
Immigrants from the Global Southeast to the Global Northwest are often perceived as backwards, and in some ways, a threat to the body politic of their host nation, with the amount of time or generations a migrant family has spent in their host country determining how modernized or civilized they are perceived to have become.

The EU High Representative of the Union for Foreign Affairs and Security Policy Josep Borrell, when commenting on the impact of the Russo-Ukrainian War, said that a division may emerge between the Global Northwest and the Global Southeast.

== See also ==
- Greater India
- Indosphere
- Global North and Global South
- Indo-Mediterranean
