= Second World =

Former group of states aligned with the Soviet Union

Political alignments in Europe during the Cold War after 1961

The Second World (Note: Sometimes lowercase as second world.) was one of the "Three Worlds" during the Cold War, which described those countries aligned with the Soviet Union and allies in the Warsaw Pact and Eastern Bloc. This grouping was directly opposed to the First World, which grouped countries aligned with the United States and its allies in NATO and the Western Bloc.

The Second World included communist states that were originally under the Soviet sphere of influence, though some eventually broke away from the Soviet ideology (e.g., Yugoslavia's split and China's split) to develop their own path as socialist states while retaining their communist governments. Most communist states remained under Soviet influence until the Revolutions of 1989. In 1991, upon the dissolution of the Soviet Union, only five communist states remained: China, Cuba, Laos, North Korea, and Vietnam. Though the terms "First World" and "Third World" continue to see present-day relevance in colloquial speech, albeit with a repurposed definition, the term "Second World" is obsolete outside of a Cold War context.

== Origins ==
During the Cold War, the Three Worlds Model was used to rank the development of countries and their economies. First World countries were capitalist and industrial; they shared similar political and economic institutions, and retained influence over parts of the former colonial world. Second World countries generally advocated state socialism and shared certain characteristics such as centrally planned economic systems, single-party states, and medium income levels. The First World and the Second World were competing for political and economic influence over the Third World, which was neither aligned with the United States nor the Soviet Union in the Cold War.

Soviet-aligned states during the Cold War

Country	Start	End	Description
Soviet Union	1922	1991	Founded in 1922; dissolved in 1991.
(Mongolian People's Republic) Mongolia	1924	1990	Soviet-backed Mongolian People's Republic established in 1924. One-party rule and Soviet alignment ended with the Mongolian Revolution of 1990.
(Socialist Federal Republic of Yugoslavia) Yugoslavia	1945	1948	Initially aligned with the Soviet Union after World War II. Expelled from the Cominform in 1948 following the Tito–Stalin split; became a founding member of the Non-Aligned Movement.
(People's Republic of Bulgaria) Bulgaria	1946	1989	Communist government established under Soviet occupation in 1946. Fell during the Revolutions of 1989.
(People's Socialist Republic of Albania) Albania	1946	1961	Communist government established in 1946 with Soviet backing. Broke with the USSR during the Albanian–Soviet split in 1961 and aligned with China.
(Polish People's Republic) Poland	1947	1989	Communist government established under Soviet influence in 1947. Fell during the Revolutions of 1989.
(Socialist Republic of Romania) Romania	1947	1989	Communist government established under Soviet occupation in 1947. Pursued an increasingly independent foreign policy from the mid-1960s under Nicolae Ceaușescu, while remaining formally in the Warsaw Pact. The regime fell during the Romanian Revolution of 1989.
North Korea	1948	1991	Soviet-backed government established in 1948. Balanced between the USSR and China throughout the Cold War. Soviet alignment ended with the dissolution of the Soviet Union in 1991.
(Czechoslovak Socialist Republic) Czechoslovakia	1948	1989	Communist government established via the 1948 coup. Fell during the Velvet Revolution of 1989.
East Germany	1949	1989	Established as a Soviet-backed state in 1949. The communist government fell following the fall of the Berlin Wall in 1989, leading to German reunification in 1990.
(Hungarian People's Republic) Hungary	1949	1989	Communist government established under Soviet influence in 1949. Fell during the Revolutions of 1989.
China	1949	1961	The Chinese Communist Revolution established the People's Republic in 1949 with Soviet support. The Sino-Soviet split from the late 1950s ended alignment by 1961.
Vietnam	1950	1991	The USSR recognized the Democratic Republic of Vietnam (North Vietnam) in 1950 and provided extensive military aid. After reunification in 1975, the Socialist Republic of Vietnam remained Soviet-aligned until the dissolution of the Soviet Union in 1991.
Egypt	1955	1972	Egypt received extensive Soviet military and economic aid from the mid-1950s, including during construction of the Aswan Dam, but was never a Marxist-Leninist state. President Anwar Sadat expelled Soviet advisors in 1972 and realigned with the United States.
Guinea	1958	1984	Under Ahmed Sékou Touré, Guinea turned to the Soviet Union after France withdrew all support upon independence. Touré oscillated between Soviet and Western alignment throughout his rule, expelling the Soviet ambassador in 1961 but quickly restoring relations. Guinea provided the USSR with strategic airport and naval access through the mid-1970s. Touré died in 1984 and a military coup ended the regime.
Ghana	1960	1966	Under Kwame Nkrumah, Ghana received significant Soviet aid and pursued socialist policies. Alignment ended with the 1966 coup.
Mali	1960	1968	Under Modibo Keïta, Mali pursued socialist policies and received Soviet aid. Alignment ended with the 1968 coup.
Cuba	1961	1991	Aligned with the Soviet Union following the Cuban Revolution. Soviet alignment ended with the dissolution of the Soviet Union in 1991.
South Yemen	1967	1990	Marxist-Leninist government established upon independence in 1967. Ceased to exist upon Yemeni unification with North Yemen in 1990.
(People's Republic of the Congo) Congo	1969	1991	Marxist-Leninist government established following a 1968 military coup. Abandoned Marxism-Leninism and transitioned to a multi-party system in 1991.
(Somali Democratic Republic) Somalia	1969	1977	Soviet-aligned following Siad Barre's 1969 coup; signed a Treaty of Friendship in 1974. Expelled Soviet advisors and abrogated the treaty in 1977 after the Soviet Union backed Ethiopia in the Ogaden War.
(History of Libya under Muammar Gaddafi) Libya	1976	1991	Under Muammar Gaddafi, Libya became a major purchaser of Soviet arms and hosted thousands of Soviet military advisors from the mid-1970s, but was formally non-aligned.
(Ba'athist Iraq) Iraq	1972	1991	Signed a Treaty of Friendship and Cooperation with the USSR in 1972. Iraq increasingly diversified toward the Western Bloc and France from the mid-1970s, and restored diplomatic relations with the United States in 1984, but the Soviet Union remained Iraq's largest arms supplier throughout the Iran–Iraq War. The relationship ended with the dissolution of the Soviet Union in 1991.
(People's Republic of Angola) Angola	1975	1990	The Soviet- and Cuban-backed MPLA government was established upon independence in 1975. Abandoned Marxism-Leninism and transitioned to a multi-party system around 1990–1991.
(People's Republic of Benin) Benin	1975	1990	Marxist-Leninist government proclaimed in 1975. Abandoned Marxism-Leninism and transitioned to a multi-party system in 1990.
(People's Republic of Mozambique) Mozambique	1975	1990	The Soviet-backed FRELIMO government was established upon independence in 1975. Abandoned Marxism-Leninism and transitioned to a multi-party system in 1990.
Laos	1975	1991	The communist Pathet Lao seized power in 1975. Soviet alignment ended with the dissolution of the Soviet Union in 1991.
Madagascar	1975	1991	Under President Didier Ratsiraka, Madagascar pursued socialist policies and granted the Soviet Union naval access, but was formally non-aligned. Ratsiraka accepted multiparty reforms in 1991 amid mass protests and the dissolution of the Soviet Union.
(People's Democratic Republic of Ethiopia) Ethiopia	1977	1991	The Derg seized power in 1974, but Soviet alignment began in 1977 when Ethiopia switched from American to Soviet backing during the Ogaden War. The regime was overthrown by the Ethiopian People's Revolutionary Democratic Front in 1991.
Seychelles	1977	1991	Under President France-Albert René, the Seychelles had a one-party socialist government and granted the Soviet Union naval access, but maintained a formally non-aligned position. Transitioned to multiparty politics in 1991.
(Democratic Republic of Afghanistan) Afghanistan	1978	1991	Communist government established in the 1978 Saur Revolution. The Soviet Union invaded in 1979 and withdrew in 1989. Soviet alignment ended with the dissolution of the Soviet Union in 1991; the government collapsed the following year.
(People's Republic of Kampuchea) Kampuchea	1979	1989	Vietnamese-backed government established after the overthrow of the Khmer Rouge in 1979. Reconstituted as the State of Cambodia in 1989, abandoning Marxism-Leninism, declaring neutrality and non-alignment, and liberalising the economy, amid the collapse of Soviet support for Vietnam. The 1991 Paris Agreements led to UN administration and free elections in 1993.
Nicaragua	1979	1990	The Sandinista government came to power in the 1979 revolution and received Soviet and Cuban support. Lost the 1990 general election and transferred power to the opposition.
Grenada	1979	1983	Revolutionary government established in a 1979 coup. Collapsed following an internal power struggle and the subsequent United States invasion in October 1983.
(Ba'athist Syria) Syria	1980	1991	Signed a Treaty of Friendship and Cooperation with the USSR in 1980 and was a major recipient of Soviet arms, but maintained significant foreign policy independence. Soviet alignment ended with the dissolution of the Soviet Union in 1991.
Burkina Faso	1983	1987	Under Thomas Sankara, Burkina Faso pursued socialist and pan-Africanist policies and received some Soviet and Cuban support, but was more closely associated with the Non-Aligned Movement than the Soviet bloc. Sankara was assassinated in a 1987 coup.

== Evolution ==
The scope of the "Second World" has varied substantially over time, and across interpretations.

=== Socialist states ===
Though most socialist states remained aligned with the Soviet Union until either dissolved, the Tito–Stalin, Sino-Soviet, and Albanian–Soviet splits in the mid-20th century led to a substantial decline in Soviet influence. Thus, the geographical scope of the Soviet-led Second World shrunk significantly. However, many continued to include communist states which were not aligned with the Soviet Union in the "Second World," such as Yugoslavia, China, Albania, and the Khmer Rouge.

By 1991, upon the dissolution of the Soviet Union and after the fall of many communist regimes, defining the Second World around Soviet influence or socialism in general became obsolete in a post-Cold War context.

=== Economic position ===
Subsequently, the colloquial meaning of the first, second, and third worlds changed from being based on political alignment to the US or USSR, to an economic definition. In particular, the second world has been applied as a synonym for middle-income countries, also known as newly industrialized countries, as those countries historically aligned with the Soviet Union or other communist states tended to be poorer and less industrialized than the Western-aligned first world (largely developed countries), but wealthier and more industrialized than the non-aligned third world (largely least developed countries).

This redefinition would therefore include non-communist, Western-aligned, and non-aligned states, such as the Russian Federation, India, Iran, Ukraine, Mexico, Brazil, and South Africa.

== Criticism ==
The three-world theory has been criticized as crude and relatively outdated for its nominal ordering, and some sociologists have instead used the words "developed", "developing", and "underdeveloped" as replacement terms for global stratification (which have been criticized as displaying a colonialist mindset); nevertheless, the three-world theory is still popular in contemporary literature and media. This might also cause semantic variation of the term between describing a region's political entities and its people.

== See also ==
- BRICS
- Eurasian Economic Union
- Socialist state
- Developing country
- Third world
- Fourth World
