= Third World =

Group of states not aligned with the US or USSR

Political alignments in Europe during the Cold War after 1961

The term Third World arose during the Cold War to define countries that remained non-aligned with either NATO or the Warsaw Pact. The United States, Canada, Japan, South Korea, Turkey, the Southern Cone, Western European countries and other allies represented the "First World", while the Soviet Union, China, Cuba, North Korea, Vietnam, Romania and the rest of the Warsaw Pact and their allies represented the "Second World". This terminology provided a way of broadly categorizing the nations of the Earth into three groups based on political divisions. Due to the complex history of evolving meanings and contexts, there is no clear or agreed-upon definition of the Third World. Strictly speaking, "Third World" was a political, rather than economic, grouping.

Since most Third World countries were economically poor and non-industrialized, it became a stereotype or a derogatory euphemism to refer to developing countries as "third-world." In political discourse, the term Third World was often associated with being underdeveloped. China was labeled "Third World" for several decades in the 20th century before its robust development in the 21st century. Some countries in the Eastern Bloc, such as Cuba, were often regarded as Third World. The Third World was normally seen to include many countries with colonial pasts in Africa, Latin America, Oceania, and Asia. It was also sometimes taken as synonymous with countries in the Non-Aligned Movement. In the dependency theory of thinkers like Raúl Prebisch, Walter Rodney, Theotônio dos Santos, and others, the Third World has also been connected to the world-systemic economic division as "periphery" countries dominated by the countries comprising the economic "core".

In the Cold War, some European democracies (Austria, Finland, Ireland, Sweden, and Switzerland) were neutral in the sense of not joining NATO, but were prosperous, never joined the Non-Aligned Movement, and seldom self-identified as part of the Third World.

Since the dissolution of the Soviet Union and the end of the Cold War, other terms have also been used instead of Third World such as developing countries, least developed countries or the Global South.

== Etymology ==
The demographer, anthropologist, and historian Alfred Sauvy, in an article published in the French magazine L'Observateur, August 14, 1952, used the term third world (tiers monde), referring to countries that were playing a small role in international trade and business. His usage was a reference to the Third Estate (tiers état), the commoners of pre-revolutionary France, who, in the Estates General, opposed the clergy and nobles, respectively the First and Second Estates (hence the use of the older form tiers rather than the modern troisième for "third"). Sauvy wrote, "This third world ignored, exploited, despised like the third estate also wants to be something." In the context of the Cold War, he conveyed the concept of political non-alignment with either the capitalist or communist bloc. Simplistic interpretations quickly led to the term merely designating these unaligned countries.

Although Sauvy is commonly credited with coining the phrase in 1952, the concept may have already been in circulation at the 1947 Asian Relations Conference in New Delhi.

== Related concepts ==
=== Third World vs. Three Worlds ===
The Three Worlds Theory was developed by Mao Zedong following the Sino-Soviet Split. Mao grouped the Soviet Union and United States together into the First World as he began to view both as hegemonic superpowers. Mao Zedong began to articulate the Three Worlds Theory in the early 1970s, and in 1974, Vice-Premier Deng Xiaoping pronounced the Three Worlds Theory at the UN General Assembly.

The "Three Worlds Theory" developed by Mao Zedong is different from the Western theory of the Third World. For example, in the Western theory, China and India belong respectively to the second and third worlds, but in Mao's theory both China and India are part of the Third World which he defined as consisting of exploited nations.

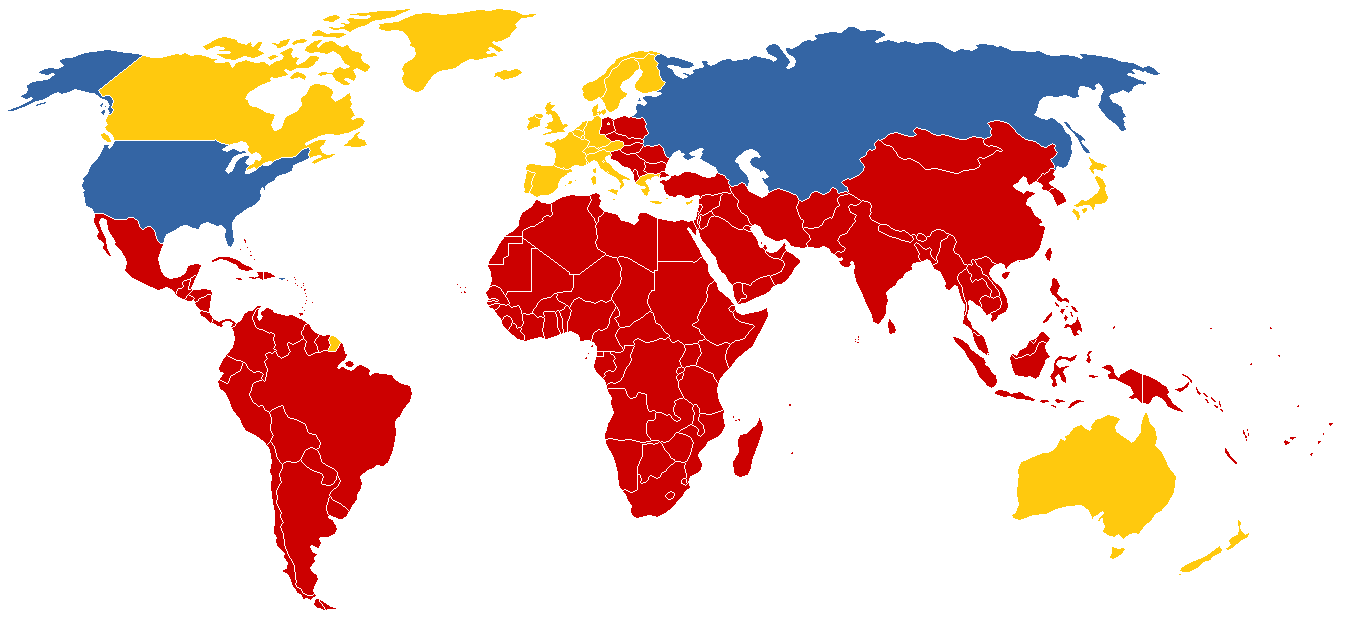
The three worlds in Three Worlds Theory First World: Superpowers Second World: Developed Countries Third World: Exploited Nations

=== Third-worldism ===
Third-worldism is a political movement that argues for the unity of Third World nations against First World influence and the principle of non-interference in other countries' domestic affairs. Groups most notable for expressing and exercising this idea are the Non-Aligned Movement (NAM) and the Group of 77, which provide a base for relations and diplomacy between not just the Third World countries, but between the Third World and the First and Second Worlds. The notion has been criticized as providing a fig leaf for human rights violations and political repression by dictatorships.

Initially, the term Third World meant a nation was under-developed or impoverished.

=== Great Divergence and Great Convergence ===
Many times there is a clear distinction between First and Third Worlds. When talking about the Global North and Global South, the majority of the time the two go hand in hand. People refer to the two as "Third World/South" and "First World/North" because the Global North is more affluent and developed, whereas the Global South is less developed and often poorer.

To counter this mode of thought, some scholars began proposing the idea of a change in world dynamics that began in the late 1980s, and termed it the Great Convergence. As Jack A. Goldstone and his colleagues put it, "in the twentieth century, the Great Divergence peaked before the First World War and continued until the early 1970s, then, after two decades of indeterminate fluctuations, in the late 1980s, it was replaced by the Great Convergence as the majority of Third World countries reached economic growth rates significantly higher than those in most First World countries".

Others have observed a return to Cold War-era alignments (MacKinnon, 2007; Lucas, 2008), this time with substantial changes between 1990–2015 in geography, the world economy and relationship dynamics between current and emerging world powers; not necessarily redefining the classic meaning of First, Second, and Third World terms, but rather which countries belong to them by way of association to which world power or coalition of countries, such as the G7, the European Union, OECD; G20, OPEC, N-11, BRICS, ASEAN; the African Union, and the Eurasian Union.

== History ==
Most Third World countries are former colonies. Having gained independence, many of these Nations, especially smaller ones, were faced with the challenges of nation- and institution-building on their own for the first time. Due to this common background, many of these nations were "developing" in economic terms for most of the 20th century, and many still are. This term, used today, generally denotes countries that have not developed to the same levels as OECD countries, and are thus in the process of developing.

In the 1980s, economist Peter Bauer offered a competing definition for the term "Third World". He claimed that the attachment of Third World status to a particular country was not based on any stable economic or political criteria, and was a mostly arbitrary process. The large diversity of countries considered part of the Third World, ranged widely from economically primitive to economically advanced and from politically non-aligned to Soviet- or Western-leaning. An argument could also be made for how parts of the U.S. are more like the Third World.

The only characteristic that Bauer found common in all Third World countries was that their governments "demand and receive Western aid," which he strongly opposed. The aggregate term "Third World" was challenged as misleading even during the Cold War period, because it had no consistent or collective identity among the countries it supposedly encompassed.

=== Development aid ===
A map of the world with Least Developed Countries, as designated by the United Nations, highlighted in red and countries formerly considered least developed highlighted in yellow

During the Cold War, unaligned countries of the Third World were seen as potential allies by both the First and Second World. Therefore, the United States and the Soviet Union went to great lengths to establish connections in these countries by offering economic and military support to gain strategically located alliances (e.g., the Soviet Union in Cuba). By the end of the Cold War, many Third World countries had adopted capitalist or communist economic models and continued to receive support from the side they had chosen. Throughout the Cold War and beyond, the countries of the Third World have been the priority recipients of Western foreign aid and the focus of economic development through mainstream theories such as modernization theory and dependency theory.

By the end of the 1960s, the idea of the Third World came to represent countries in Africa, Asia, and Latin America that were considered underdeveloped by the West based on several characteristics: low economic development, low life expectancy, high rates of poverty and disease, and others. These countries became the targets for aid and support from governments, non-governmental organizations (NGOs), and individuals from wealthier nations. One popular model, known as Rostow's stages of growth, argued that development took place in five stages: traditional society, pre-conditions for take-off, take-off, drive to maturity, and age of high mass consumption. W. W. Rostow argued that "take-off" was the critical stage with which the Third World was struggling, which some argued could be facilitated through foreign aid.

=== Perceived "End of the Third World" ===
Since 1990 the term "Third World" evolved to denote countries with less economic development. The term "Third World" is increasingly perceived to be politically incorrect or outdated, as it is a historical term that is not as relevant in modern day geopolitics. Around the early 1960s, the term "underdeveloped countries" was frequently used to refer to roughly the same group of countries. This term was in turn replaced by 'developing' and 'less-developed' countries, as politicians found that the earlier term contributed to stereotypes or disrespect of this group of countries.

The general definition of the Third World can be traced back to the history that nations positioned as neutral and independent during the Cold War were considered as Third World Countries, and normally these countries are defined by high poverty rates, lack of resources, and unstable financial standing.

The differences among nations of the Third World are continually growing throughout time, and it will be hard to use the Third World to define and organize groups of nations based on their common political arrangements since most countries live under diverse creeds in this era, such as Mexico, El Salvador, and Singapore, which each have their distinct political systems. The Third World categorization becomes anachronistic since its political classification and economic system are distinct to be applied in today's society. Based on the Third World standards, any region of the world can be categorized into any of the four types of relationships among state and society, and will eventually end in four outcomes: praetorianism, multi-authority, quasi-democratic and viable democracy.

== See also ==
- Fourth World
- Majority World
- Neutral and Non-Aligned European States
- Subaltern Studies
