= Global North and Global South =

Terms that denote two groups of countries

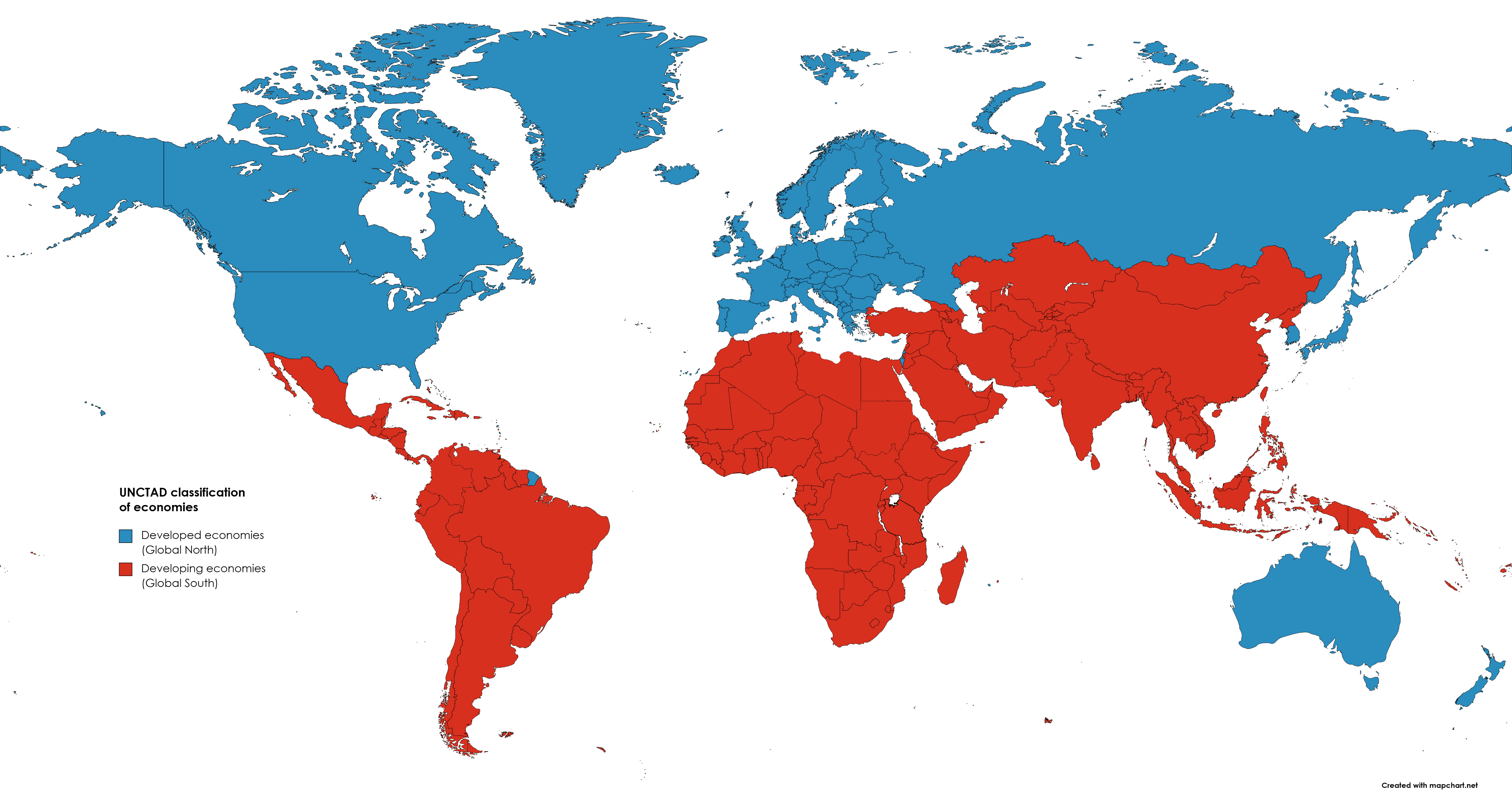
Economic classification of the world's countries and territories by the UNCTAD in 2023: "North" refers to the developed economies, highlighted in blue; and "South" to the developing and least developed economies, highlighted in red. UNCTAD notes that "the designations "developing" and "developed" are intended for statistical convenience and do not necessarily express a judgement about the stage reached by a particular economy in the development process".

Global North and Global South are terms denoting a method of grouping countries based on their defining characteristics with regard to socioeconomics. The terms refer to developed and developing/least developed countries respectively. According to UN Trade and Development (UNCTAD), the Global South broadly comprises Africa, Latin America and the Caribbean, Asia (excluding Israel, Japan, South Korea), and Oceania (excluding Australia and New Zealand). Most of the Global South's countries are commonly identified as lacking in their standard of living, which includes having lower incomes, high levels of poverty, high population growth rates, inadequate housing, limited educational opportunities, and deficient health systems, among other issues. Additionally, these countries' cities are characterized by their poor infrastructure. Opposite to the Global South is the Global North, which the UNCTAD describes as broadly comprising Northern America and Europe, Israel, Japan, South Korea, Australia, and New Zealand. Consequently the two groups do not correspond to the Northern Hemisphere or the Southern Hemisphere, as many of the Global South's countries are geographically located in the north and vice-versa.

The Global North and the Global South are often defined in terms of their differing levels of wealth, economic development, income inequality, and strength of democracy, as well as by their political freedom and economic freedom, as defined by a variety of freedom indices. Countries of the Global North tend to be wealthier, and export technologically advanced manufactured products, among other characteristics. In contrast, countries of the Global South tend to be relatively poorer, and heavily dependent on their largely agrarian-based economic primary sectors. (Note: In most countries of the Global South, agriculture continues to dominate industry, manufacturing, and services in the formation of the structures of production. For many African countries agriculture constitutes more than 50 percent of the gross domestic product; for Bangladesh (at 30 percent) or Nepal (43 percent) or India (27 percent) it is high, unlike the 2 or 3 percent for the Netherlands, Japan, or Italy, which although possessing strong agricultural production, have diversified economies. Moreover, many developing economies are still highly dependent on the export of primary commodities — food, raw materials, fuels, and base metals — patterns established during the colonial era.) Some scholars suggest that the inequality gap between the Global North and the Global South has narrowed since globalization. Others contend that the Global South has instead become poorer vis-à-vis the Global North.

The Global South classification, as used by governmental and developmental organizations, was first introduced as a more open and value-free alternative to Third World, and likewise potentially "valuing" terms such as developed and developing. Countries of the Global South are also described as being newly industrialized or in the process of industrializing. Many of them are current or former subjects of colonialism. Since World War II, "South–South cooperation" (SSC) to "challenge the political and economic dominance of the North" has become more prominent among the Global South's countries. It has become popular due to the geographical migration of manufacturing and production activity from the Global North to the Global South, and has influenced diplomatic policies of the Global South's more powerful countries, such as China. These contemporary economic trends have enhanced the potential of economic growth and industrialization in the Global South.

== Definition ==
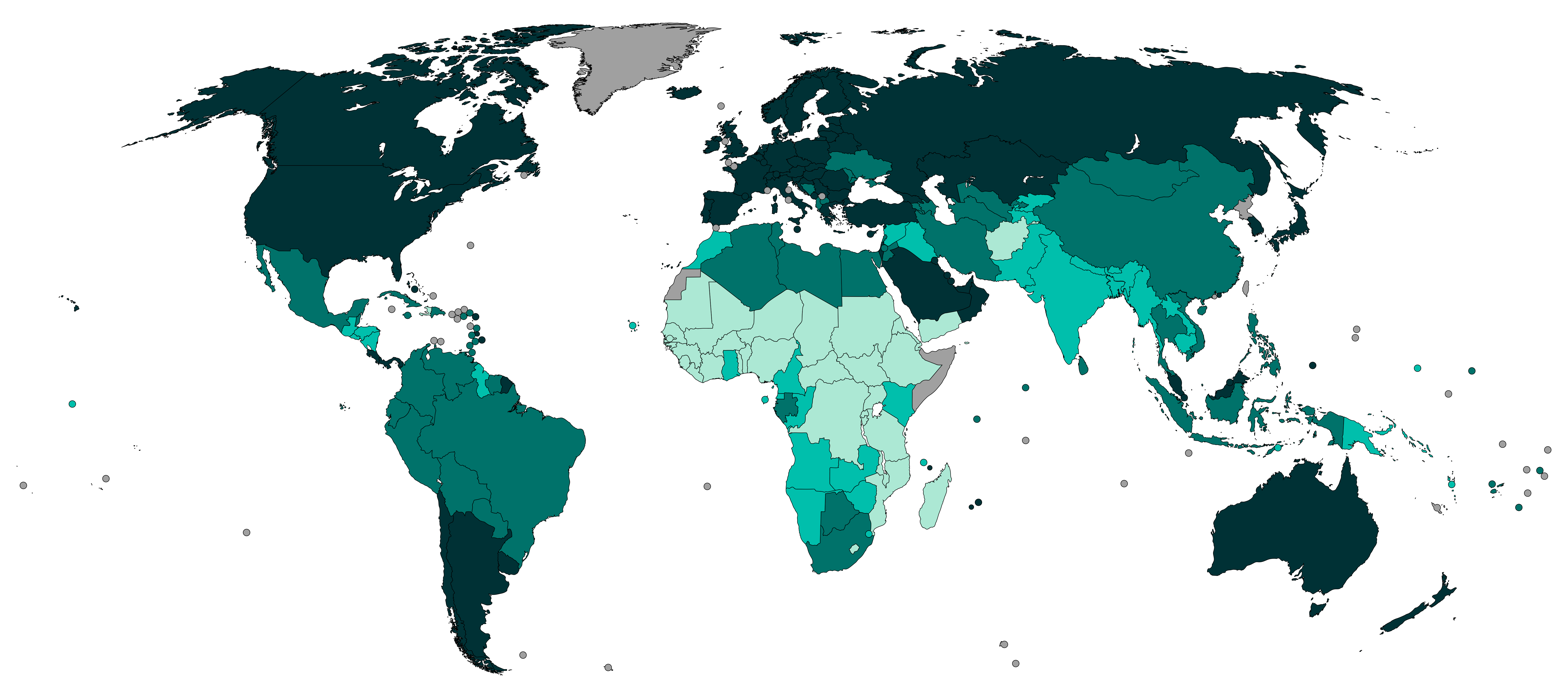
World map representing Human Development Index categories (based on 2019 data, published in 2020): 0.800–1.000 (very high) 0.700–0.799 (high) 0.550–0.699 (medium) / 0.350–0.549 (low) Data unavailable

The terms Global North and Global South are not strictly geographical, and are not "an image of the world divided by the equator, separating richer countries from their poorer counterparts." Rather, geography should be more readily understood as economic and migratory, in the "wider context of globalization or global capitalism."

In general, definitions for Global North and Global South, do not refer to the geographical North or the geographical South. The Global North broadly comprises Northern America and Europe, Israel, Japan, South Korea, Australia, and New Zealand, as per the UNCTAD. (Note: Although Hong Kong, Macau, Singapore and Taiwan have very-high Human Development Indices and are classified as advanced economies by the International Monetary Fund, UN Trade and Development classifies them as the Global South. Also, Singapore is the one of Small Island Developing States.) The Global South broadly comprises Africa, Latin America and the Caribbean, Asia excluding Israel, Japan, and South Korea, and Oceania excluding Australia and New Zealand, also according to the UNCTAD. Some, such as Australian sociologists Fran Collyer and Raewyn Connell, have argued that Australia and New Zealand are marginalized in similar ways to other Global South countries, due to their geographical isolation and location in the Southern Hemisphere.

The term Global North is often used interchangeably with developed countries, whereas the term Global South with developing countries. Characteristically, most countries in the Global South are commonly identified as lacking in their standard of living, these include having: lower incomes, high levels of poverty, high population growth rates, limited educational opportunities, deficient health care systems, among other issues. Also, cities in the Global South are identified for their poor infrastructure. Economies of the Global North are diversified, whereas the agriculture sector is the major contributor to economic activity in the Global South.

== Development of the terms ==
Countries described as high-income by the World Bank in 2024

Carl Oglesby used the term global south in 1969, writing in Catholic journal Commonweal in a special issue on the Vietnam War. Oglesby argued that centuries of northern "dominance over the global south […] [has] converged […] to produce an intolerable social order."

The term gained appeal throughout the second half of the 20th century, which rapidly accelerated in the early 21st century. It appeared in fewer than two dozen publications in 2004, but in hundreds of publications by 2013. The emergence of the new term meant looking at the troubled realities of its predecessors, i.e.: Third World or developing world. The term Global South, in contrast, was intended to be less hierarchical. Compared to the alternatives, the term has been deemed useful as it constitutes a lens through which this group of countries keep seeing and narrating their problems in a distinctive way vis-à-vis "developed" countries in Europe, North America and Asia.

The idea of categorizing countries by their economic and developmental status began during the Cold War with the classifications of East and West. The Soviet Union and China represented the East, and the United States and their allies represented the West. The term Third World came into parlance in the second half of the twentieth century. It originated in a 1952 article by Alfred Sauvy entitled "Trois Mondes, Une Planète". Early definitions of the Third World emphasized its exclusion from the east–west conflict of the Cold War as well as the ex-colonial status and poverty of the peoples it comprised.

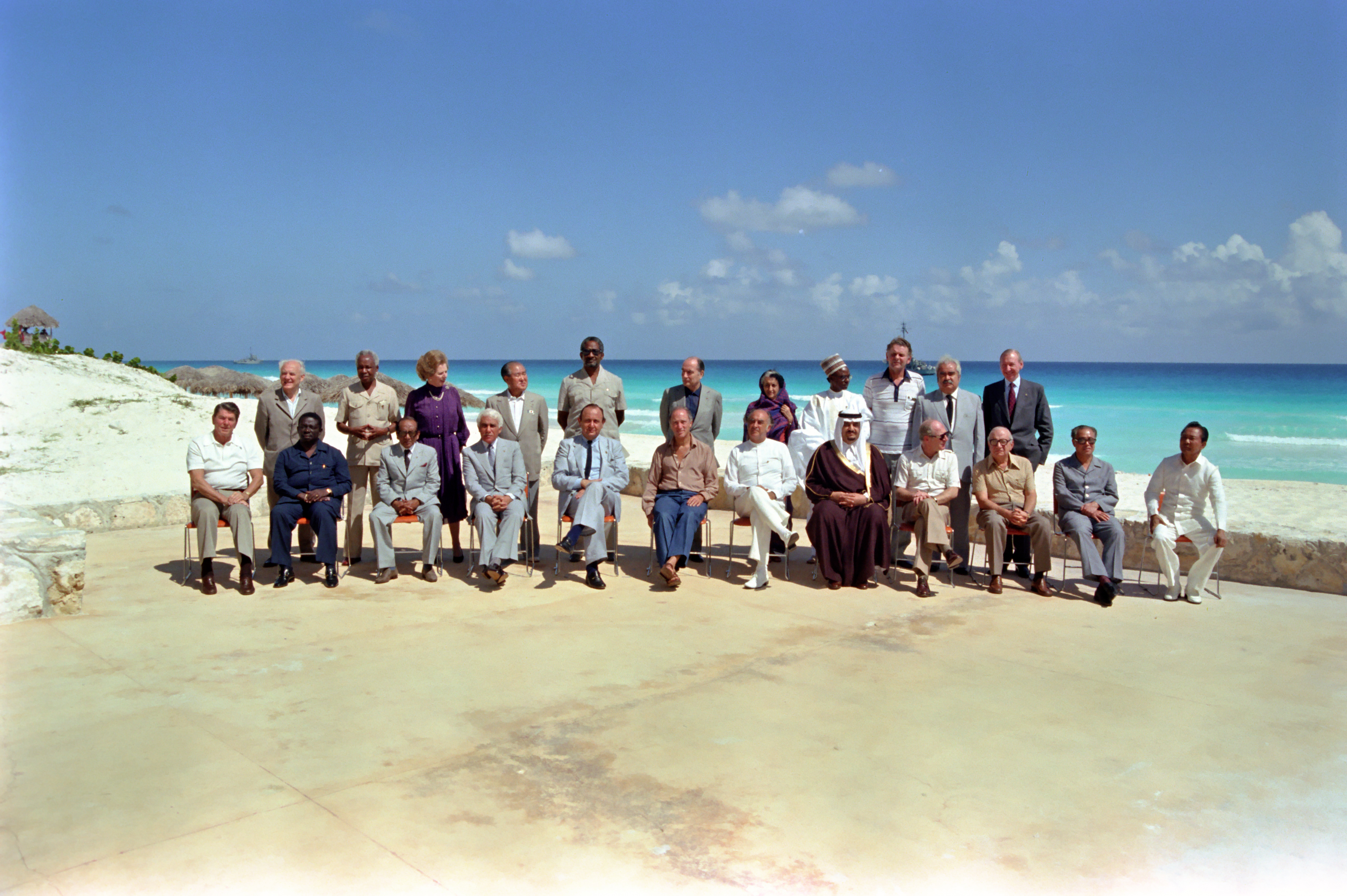
Heads of state and heads of government at the 1981 North–South Summit in Cancun, Mexico

There have been efforts to mobilize the Third World as a political entity. The 1955 Bandung Conference was an early meeting of Third World states in which an alternative to alignment with either the Eastern or Western Blocs was promoted. Following this, the first Non-Aligned Summit was organized in 1961. Contemporaneously, a mode of economic criticism which separated the world economy into "core" and "periphery" was developed and given expression in a project for political reform which "moved the terms 'North' and 'South' into the international political lexicon."

In 1973, the pursuit of a New International Economic Order which was to be negotiated between the North and South was initiated at the Non-Aligned Summit held in Algiers. Also in 1973, the oil embargo initiated by Arab OPEC countries as a result of the Yom Kippur War caused an increase in world oil prices, with prices continuing to rise throughout the decade. This contributed to a worldwide recession which resulted in industrialized nations increasing economically protectionist policies and contributing less aid to the less developed countries of the South. The slack was taken up by Western banks, which provided substantial loans to Third World countries. However, many of these countries were not able to pay back their debt, which led the IMF to extend further loans to them on the condition that they undertake certain liberalizing reforms. This policy, which came to be known as structural adjustment, and was institutionalized by international financial institutions (IFIs) and Western governments, represented a break from the Keynesian approach to foreign aid which had been the norm from the end of the Second World War.

After 1987, reports on the negative social impacts that structural adjustment policies had led IFIs to supplement structural adjustment policies with targeted anti-poverty projects. Following the end of the Cold War and the break-up of the Soviet Union, some Second World countries joined the First World, and others joined the Third World. A new and simpler classification was needed. Use of the terms "North" and "South" became more widespread.

=== Brandt Line ===
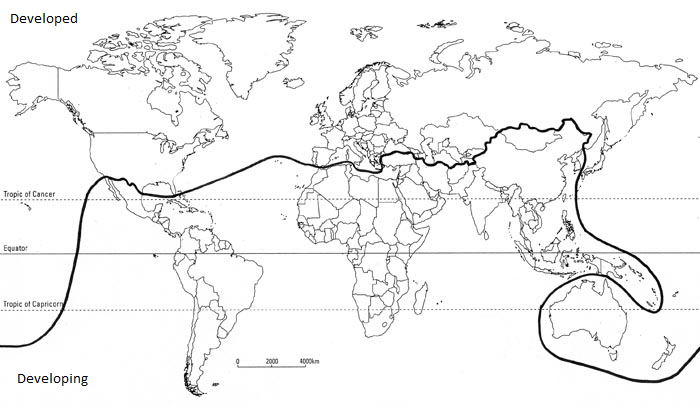
The Brandt Line, a proposal from the 1980s dividing the world into the developed north and the developing south

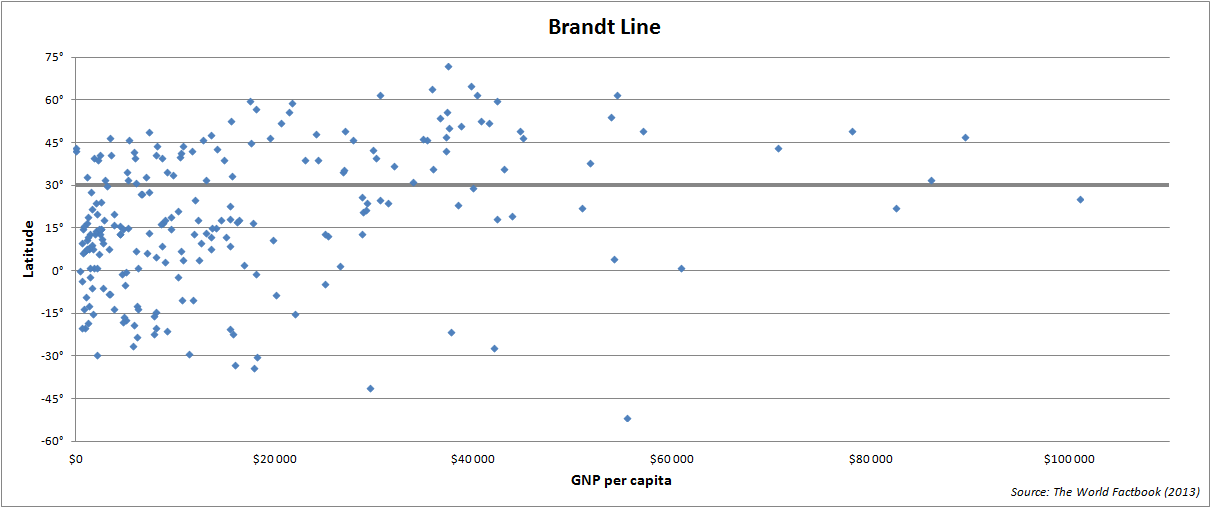
Countries' average latitude and GDP per capita according to The World Factbook (2013). The Brandt Line is shown in bold.

The Brandt Line is a visual depiction of the north–south divide, proposed by West German former Chancellor Willy Brandt in the 1980s in the report titled North–South: A Programme for Survival which was later known as the Brandt Report. This line divides the world at a latitude of approximately 30° North, passing between the United States and Mexico, north of Africa and the Middle East, climbing north over China and Mongolia, then dipping south to include Japan, Australia, and New Zealand in the "Rich North". As of 2023 the Brandt line has been criticised for being outdated, yet is still regarded as a helpful way to visualise global inequalities.

=== Uses of the term Global South ===
Global South "emerged in part to aid countries in the southern hemisphere to work in collaboration on political, economic, social, environmental, cultural, and technical issues." This is called South–South cooperation (SSC), a "political and economical term that refers to the long-term goal of pursuing world economic changes that mutually benefit countries in the Global South and lead to greater solidarity among the disadvantaged in the world system." The hope is that countries within the Global South will "assist each other in social, political, and economical development, radically altering the world system to reflect their interests and not just the interests of the Global North in the process." It is guided by the principles of "respect for national sovereignty, national ownership, independence, equality, non-conditionality, non-interference in domestic affairs, and mutual benefit." Countries using this model of South–South cooperation see it as a "mutually beneficial relationship that spreads knowledge, skills, expertise and resources to address their development challenges such as high population pressure, poverty, hunger, disease, environmental deterioration, conflict and natural disasters." These countries also work together to deal with "cross border issues such as environmental protection, HIV/AIDS", and the movement of capital and labor.

Social psychiatrist Vincenzo Di Nicola has applied the Global South as a bridge between the critiques globalization and the gaps and limitations of the Global Mental Health Movement, invoking Boaventura de Sousa Santos' notion of "epistemologies of the South" to create a new epistemology for social psychiatry.

== Defining development ==
The Dictionary of Human Geography defines development as "processes of social change or [a change] to class and state projects to transform national economies".

Economic development is a measure of progress in a specific economy. It refers to advancements in technology, a transition from an economy based largely on agriculture to one based on industry and an improvement in living standards.

Being categorized as part of the "North" implies development as opposed to belonging to the "South", which implies a lack thereof. According to N. Oluwafemi Mimiko, the South lacks the right technology, it is politically unstable, its economies are divided, and its foreign exchange earnings depend on primary product exports to the North, along with the fluctuation of prices. The low level of control it exercises over imports and exports condemns the South to conform to the 'imperialist' system. The South's lack of development and the high level of development of the North deepen the inequality between them and leave the South a source of raw material for the developed countries. The North becomes synonymous with economic development and industrialization while the South represents the previously colonized countries which are in need of help in the form of international aid agendas.

Furthermore, in Regionalism Across the North–South Divide: State Strategies and Globalization, Jean Grugel stated that the three factors that direct the economic development of states in the Global south are "élite behaviour within and between nation states, integration and cooperation within 'geographic' areas, and the resulting position of states and regions within the global world market and related political economic hierarchy."

== Theories explaining the divide ==
The disparity in development between the North and the South has been explained in historical terms. Dependency theory emphasizes how colonial relations between the Global North and South have made colonized territories in the south poorer. Theorists of this school state that the economies of ex-colonial states remain oriented towards serving external rather than internal demand, and that development regimes undertaken in this context have often caused strong class hierarchies in underdeveloped countries (as are found in industrialized countries), while maintaining higher levels of poverty. Dependency theory is closely linked with Latin American Structuralism, the only school of development economics from the Global South to be affiliated with a national research institute and to receive support from national banks and finance ministries. The Structuralists defined dependency as the inability of a nation's economy to complete the cycle of capital accumulation without reliance on an outside economy. More specifically, peripheral nations were perceived as primary resource exporters reliant on core economies for manufactured goods. This led structuralists to advocate for import-substitution industrialization policies which aimed to replace manufactured imports with domestically made products.

New Economic Geography seeks to explain development disparities in terms of the physical organization of industry, arguing that firms tend to cluster in order to benefit from economies of scale and increase productivity which leads ultimately to an increase in wages. The North has more firm clustering than the South, making its industries more competitive. It is argued that only when wages in the North reach a certain height, will it become more profitable for firms to operate in the South, allowing clustering to begin.

=== Associated theories ===
The term "Global South" has many researched theories associated with it. Since many of the countries that are considered to be a part of the Global South were once colonized by Global North countries, they are at a disadvantage to become as quickly developed. Dependency theorists suggest that information has a top-down approach and first goes to the Global North before countries in the Global South receive it. Although many of these countries rely on political or economic help, this also opens up opportunity for information to develop Western bias and create an academic dependency. Meneleo Litonjua describes the reasoning behind distinctive problems of dependency theory as "the basic context of poverty and underdevelopment of Third World/Global South countries was not their traditionalism, but the dominance-dependence relationship between rich and poor, powerful and weak counties."

What brought about much of the dependency, was the push to become modernized. After World War II, the U.S. made effort to assist developing countries financially in attempt to pull them out of poverty. Modernization theory "sought to remake the Global South in the image and likeliness of the First World/Global North." In other terms, "societies can be fast-tracked to modernization by 'importing' Western technical capital, forms of organization, and science and technology to developing countries." With this ideology, as long as countries follow in Western ways, they can develop quicker.

After modernization attempts took place, theorists started to question the effects through post-development perspectives. Postdevelopment theorists try to explain that not all developing countries need to be following Western ways but instead should create their own development plans. This means that "societies at the local level should be allowed to pursue their own development path as they perceive it without the influences of global capital and other modern choices, and thus a rejection of the entire paradigm from Eurocentric model and the advocation of new ways of thinking about the non-Western societies." The goal of postdevelopment was to reject development rather than reform by choosing to embrace non-Western ways.

== Challenges ==
Developed countries or territories (IMF) Developing countries or territories (IMF) Least developed countries (UN) Data unavailable World map showing country classifications per the IMF and the UN (last updated April 2023)

The accuracy of the North–South divide has been challenged on a number of grounds. Firstly, differences in the political, economic and demographic make-up of countries tend to complicate the idea of a monolithic South. Globalization has also challenged the notion of two distinct economic spheres. Following the liberalization of post-Mao China initiated in 1978, growing regional cooperation between the national economies of Asia has led to the growing decentralization of the North as the main economic power. The economic status of the South has also been fractured. As of 2015, all but roughly the bottom 60 nations of the Global South were thought to be gaining on the North in terms of income, diversification, and participation in the world market.

However, some scholars, notably Jason Hickel and Robert Wade have suggested that the Global South is not rising economically, and that global inequality between the North and South has risen since globalization. Using a model which assumes that land, labor and resources located in the Global South should have the same dollar cost as similar resources in the Global North, Hickel has suggested that the exchange of trade resources between the South and the North is substantially unbalanced, with Global North countries extracting about 10–11 trillion dollars from the Global South in 2015. Hickel compares this amount of financial aid given to Global South by a factor of 30.

Globalization has largely displaced the North–South divide as the theoretical underpinning of the development efforts of international institutions such as the IMF, World Bank, WTO, and various United Nations affiliated agencies, though these groups differ in their perceptions of the relationship between globalization and inequality. Yet some remain critical of the accuracy of globalization as a model of the world economy, emphasizing the enduring centrality of nation-states in world politics and the prominence of regional trade relations. Lately, there have been efforts to integrate the Global South more meaningfully into the world economic order.

=== Debates over the term ===
With its development, many scholars preferred using Global South over its predecessors, such as developing countries and Third World. Leigh Anne Duck, co-editor of Global South, argued that the term is better suited to resist "hegemonic forces that threaten the autonomy and development of these countries." The Global South–Global North distinction has been preferred to the older developed–developing dichotomy as it does not imply a hierarchy. Alvaro Mendez (economist), co-founder of the London School of Economics and Political Science's Global South Unit, has applauded the empowering aspects of the term. In an article, Discussion on Global South, Mendez discusses emerging economies in nations like China, India, Mexico and Brazil. It is predicted that by 2030, 80% of the world's middle-class population will be living in developing countries. The popularity of the term "marks a shift from a central focus on development and cultural difference" and recognizes the importance of geopolitical relations.

Critics of this usage often argue that it is a vague blanket term. Others have argued that the term, its usage, and its subsequent consequences mainly benefit those from the upper classes of countries within the Global South; who stand "to profit from the political and economic reality [of] expanding south-south relations."

According to scholar Anne Garland Mahler, this nation-based understanding of the Global South is regarded as an appropriation of a concept that has deeper roots in Cold War radical political thought. In this political usage, the Global South is employed in a more geographically fluid way, referring to "spaces and peoples negatively impacted by contemporary capitalist globalization." In other words, "there are economic Souths in the geographic North and Norths in the geographic South." Through this geographically fluid definition, another meaning is attributed to the Global South where it refers to a global political community that is formed when the world's "Souths" recognize one another and view their conditions as shared.

The geographical boundaries of the Global South remain a source of debate. Some scholars agree that the term is not a "static concept". Others have argued against "grouping together a large variety of countries and regions into one category [because it] tends to obscure specific (historical) relationships between different countries and/or regions", and the power imbalances within these relationships. This "may obscure wealth differences within countries – and, therefore, similarities between the wealthy in the Global South and Global North, as well as the dire situation the poor may face all around the world."

== Future development ==
Some economists have argued that international free trade and unhindered capital flows across countries could lead to a contraction in the North–South divide. In this case more equal trade and flow of capital would allow the possibility for developing countries to further develop economically. Economists such as Martin Khor challenged these arguments by illustrating how the South's lack of economic capacity and infrastructure limit the movement to reduce the divide.

Since the mid-1990s, poorer countries have been catching up with richer ones, albeit slowly; across a range of data sources, nominal per capita GDP from the World Bank's World Development Indicators and real per capita GDP from both the Penn World Tables and the Maddison Project, non-high income countries have grown faster than high-income countries in the 21st century. Debates about a “middle-income trap” also appear anachronistic: middle-income countries have exhibited higher growth rates than all others since the mid-1980s.

As some countries in the South experience rapid development, there is evidence that those states are developing high levels of South–South aid. Brazil, in particular, has been noted for its high levels of aid ($1 billion annually—ahead of many traditional – but much smaller – donors) and the ability to use its own experiences to provide high levels of expertise and knowledge transfer. This has been described as a "global model in waiting".

The United Nations has also established its role in diminishing the divide between North and South through the Millennium Development Goals, all of which were to be achieved by 2015. These goals seek to eradicate extreme poverty and hunger, achieve global universal education and healthcare, promote gender equality and empower women, reduce child mortality, improve maternal health, combat HIV/AIDS, malaria, and other diseases, ensure environmental sustainability, and develop a global partnership for development. These were replaced in 2015 by 17 Sustainable Development Goals (SDGs). The SDGs, set in 2015 by the United Nations General Assembly and intended to be achieved by 2030, are part of a UN Resolution called "The 2030 Agenda".

== Society and culture ==
=== Digital and technological divide ===
The global digital divide is often characterized as corresponding to the north–south divide; however, Internet use, and especially broadband access, is now soaring in Asia compared with other continents. This phenomenon is partially explained by the ability of many countries in Asia to leapfrog older Internet technology and infrastructure, coupled with booming economies which allow vastly more people to get online.

=== Media representation ===
Mass media have often compared the Global South to the North, and are thought to be an aid in the divide. Western media tends to present a generalized view of developing countries through biased media coverage, mass media outlets tend to focus disproportionately on poverty and other negative imagery. This common coverage has created a dominant stereotype of developing countries as: "the 'South' is characterized by socioeconomic and political backwardness, measured against Western values and standards."

Mass media has also played a role in what information the people in developing countries receive. The news often covers developed countries and creates an imbalance of information flow.

== Political representation ==
=== India ===
Prime Minister Narendra Modi, speaking at the 17th BRICS Summit in July 2025, emphasized that two-thirds of humanity from the Global South remain underrepresented in 20th-century global institutions, calling for urgent reforms to bodies such as the United Nations Security Council, the World Trade Organization, and Multilateral Development Banks. He affirmed that under India's 2026 BRICS presidency, the concerns of the Global South would be a central priority, reflecting a people-centric and inclusive vision for global governance.

== See also ==
- BRICS, CIVETS, MINT, VISTA
- East–West dichotomy
- First World
- Fourth World
- Global East
- Global majority, roughly corresponding to Global South peoples
- Global West
- Majority World
- Golden billion (conspiracy theory)
- Group of 77
- Inglehart–Welzel cultural map of the world
- International Solar Alliance
- Non-Aligned Movement
- North–South Centre, an institution of the Council of Europe, awarding the North–South Prize
- North–South model, in economics theory
- North–South Summit, the only North–South summit ever held, with 22 heads of state and government taking part
- Northern and southern China
- Three-world model
- World-systems theory

=== Subregions of Global North ===
- Arctic Circle
- Global Northwest
- North Atlantic
  - NATO
- North Pacific

=== Subregions of Global South ===
- Afro-Asia
  - Global Southeast
    - ASEAN (or geographically Southeast Asia)
