= Alfred Sauvy =

French academic (1898–1990)

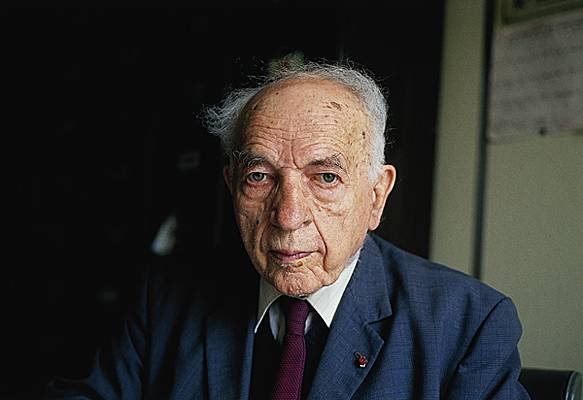
- Alfred Sauvy in 1983.
- Born: 31 October 1898; Villeneuve-de-la-Raho (France)
- Died: 30 October 1990 (aged 91); Paris, France
- Resting place: Montalba-le-Château
- Occupations: Demographer, professor
- Employer: Collège de France (1959–1969)
- Awards: Montyon Science Award (statistics, 1967); (1984)

Alfred Sauvy (31 October 1898 – 30 October 1990) was a demographer, anthropologist and historian of the French economy. Sauvy made an important early use of the phrase Third World ("Tiers Monde") in reference to countries that were unaligned with either the Western bloc or the Eastern bloc during the Cold War, for which he has often been credited with coining the phrase.

== Biography ==
Sauvy was born in Villeneuve-de-la-Raho (Pyrénées-Orientales) in 1898 to a family of Catalan wine-growers, and educated at the École Polytechnique. After graduating, he worked at Statistique Générale de France until 1937. He took part in the X-Crise Group. From 1938, he was economic advisor to Minister of Finance Paul Reynaud until the Second World War broke out in 1939. He founded Institut Français de la Conjoncture in 1938.

Under the Nazi occupation, Sauvy contributed to the Bulletins rouge-brique, a government-sanctioned periodical. After the war, Charles de Gaulle offered to appoint him to the position of General Secretary for Family and Population, but Sauvy preferred to devote himself to demographics.

From 1940 to 1959, he taught at the Institut d’études politiques (IEP) and was Professor of Social Demography at the Collège de France.

He became director of INED (National Institute of Demographic Studies) and simultaneously represented France at the commission of Statistics and Population of the United Nations. He was a member of the American Academy of Arts and Sciences (1973) and the American Philosophical Society (1974). He wrote for Le Monde until his death in October 1990.

== Key ideas ==
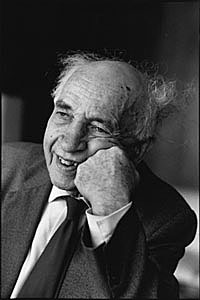
Alfred Sauvy in 1983

Writing in 1949, Sauvy described potential overpopulation as a 'false problem' and argued against attempts at global population control. He suggested examining countries on a case-by-case basis to determine whether they lack the raw materials and natural resources that can support a larger population. Otherwise, he thought that we run the risk of underpopulating a country that could support a much larger population

Sauvy used the term 'Third World' in an article published in the French magazine, L'Observateur on August 14, 1952. He wrote:

"...car enfin, ce Tiers Monde ignoré, exploité, méprisé comme le Tiers Etat, veut lui aussi, être quelque chose"
"...because at the end, this ignored, exploited, scorned Third World, like the Third Estate, wants also, to become something".

Sauvy used the term in an analogy with the Third Estate and the above quote is a paraphrase of Sieyès's famous sentence about the Third Estate during the French Revolution.

== Works ==
- 1952 (Vol. 1), 1955 (Vol. 2). Théorie Générale de la Population.
- 1958 De Malthus à Mao-Tsé-Toung (Collection Thémis -Sciences sociales)
- 1977 Coût et valeur de la vie humaine—Paris : Hermann, 210 p.
- 1980 La machine et le chômage : les progrès techniques et l'emploi—Paris : Dunod/Bordas, 320 p.
- 1984 Le travail noir et l'économie de demain—Paris : Calmann-Lévy, 304 p.
- 1985 De la rumeur à l'histoire—Paris : Dunod, 304 p.
- 1990 La terre et les hommes : le monde où il va, le monde d'où il vient—Paris : Economica, 187 p.

== Legacy ==
The Prix Alfred Sauvy (Alfred Sauvy Prize) is awarded annually to startup projects and social enterprises in the Pyrénées-Orientales region.

There are streets named after Sauvy in Pollestres, Rivesaltes, and Villemolaque in France.
