= Fourth World =

Extension of the three-world model

The Fourth World is an extension of the three-world model, used variably to refer to

1. Sub-populations socially excluded from global society, such as uncontacted peoples;
2. Hunter-gatherer, nomadic, pastoral, and some subsistence farming peoples living beyond the modern industrial norm.
3. Sub-populations existing in a First World country, but with the living standards of those of a Third World.

The term is not commonly used. "Fourth World" has also been used to refer to other parts of the world in relation to the three-world model.

== Etymology ==
Fourth World follows the First World, Second World, and Third World classification of nation-state status; however, unlike the former categories, Fourth World is not spatially bounded, and is usually used to refer to size and shape which does not map onto citizenship in a specific nation-state. It can denote nations without a sovereign state, emphasizing the perceived non-recognition and exclusion of ethnically- and religiously defined peoples from the politico-economic world system, such as the First Nations groups throughout North, Central and South America. Spanish sociologist Manuel Castells of the University of Southern California Annenberg School for Communication has made extensive use of the term fourth world.

== Coinage ==
The term was coined in 1969 by Father Joseph Wresinski when he renamed the charity he had founded in 1957 with families from the Noisy-le-Grand (France) shanty town to ATD Quart Monde.

The term was recycled in the 1970s by Mbuto Milando, first secretary of the Tanzanian High Commission, in conversation with George Manuel, Chief of the National Indian Brotherhood (now the Assembly of First Nations). Milando stated that "When Native peoples come into their own, on the basis of their own cultures and traditions, that will be the Fourth World."

Since publication of Manuel's The Fourth World: An Indian Reality (1974), the term Fourth World became synonymous with stateless, poor, and marginal nations. Since 1979, think tanks such as the Center for World Indigenous Studies have used the term in defining the relationships between ancient, tribal, and non-industrial nations and modern industrialised nation-states. With the 2007 UN Declaration on the Rights of Indigenous Peoples, communications and organizing amongst Fourth World peoples have accelerated in the form of international treaties between aboriginal nations for the purposes of trade, travel, and security. In the Indian left movement, M. P. Parameswaran's ideas on the fourth world caused widespread debates, which eventually led to his expulsion from the Communist Party of India (Marxist) in 2004.

== See also ==
- Inequality
- Least developed countries
- National wealth
- Stateless nation
