= Revolutionary black internationalism =

Political / racial theory

Revolutionary black internationalism is a political theory developed by the Revolutionary Action Movement (RAM). Developed during the Black Power movement of the 1960s, the theory proposes that the principal contradiction in the world is that between Western imperialism and the people of Asia, Africa, and Latin America, who are collectively considered "black" in this theory. The theory has been criticized for equating race with class, which goes against traditional Marxist thought.

== Theory ==
=== Black underclass ===
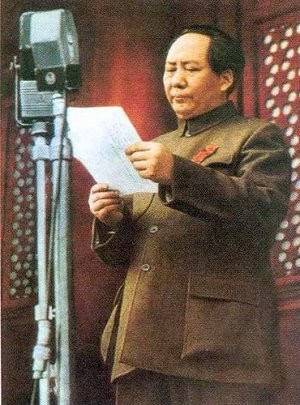
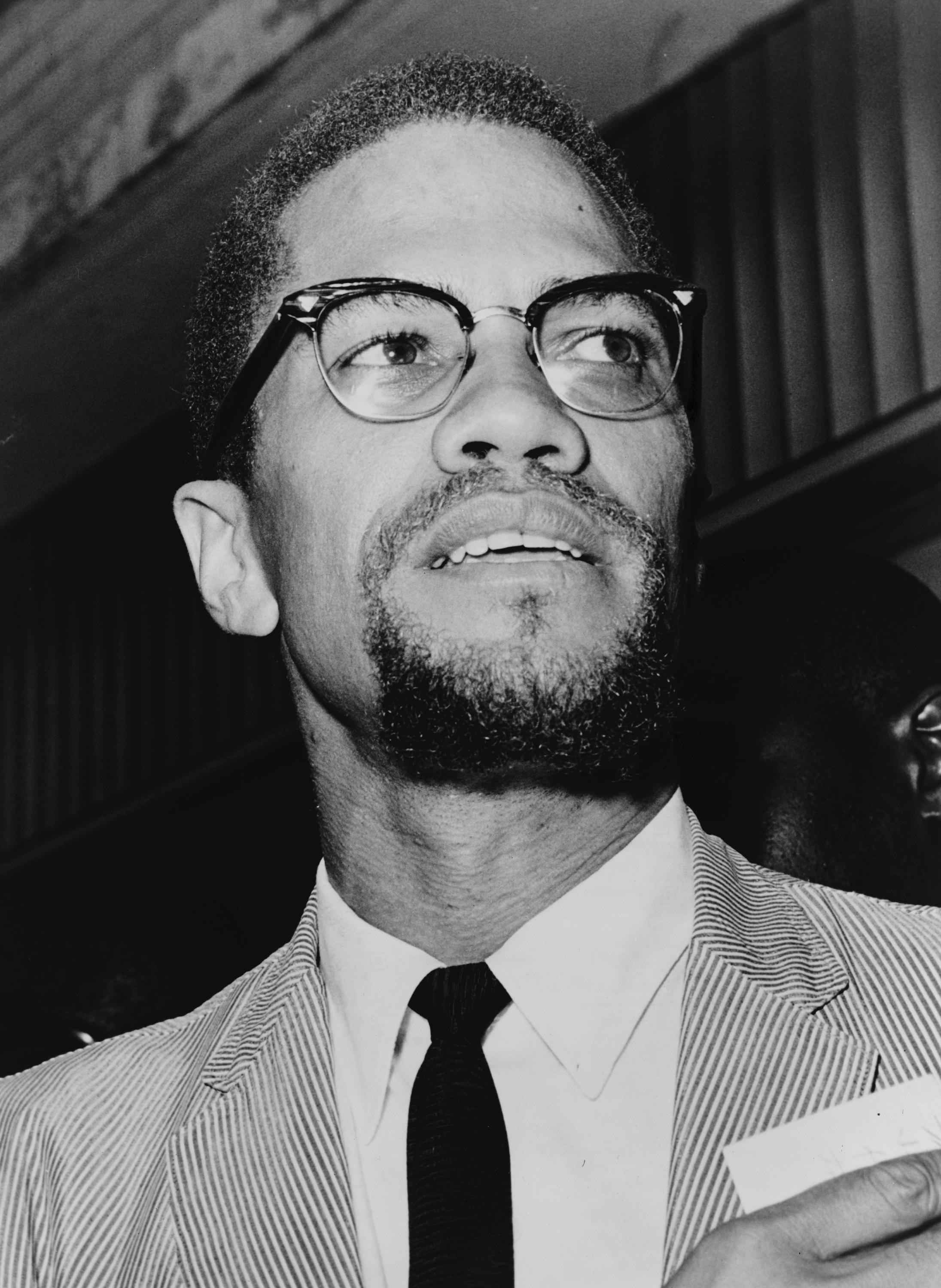
RAM considered Mao Zedong and Malcolm X to be black internationalist leaders.

According to revolutionary black internationalism, although economic exploitation under capitalism initially occurred on class lines, this exploitation maintains itself on a racial basis, with the European working class benefiting from the super-profits extracted from the colonial world (Asia, Africa and Latin America). Accordingly, all of European society constitutes a "European overclass", while all of the colonial world is considered a "black underclass", including the black bourgeoisie and black petty-bourgeoisie. Revolutionary black internationalism uses the term "black" to refer to all non-white people in the world, as outlined by RAM's former national chairmain Max Stanford:

Black people of the world (darker races, black, yellow, brown, red, oppressed peoples) are all enslaved by the same forces.

As a result of this relationship, the European overclass (consisting of all of European and Euro-American society) is the oppressor class, while the black underclass (consisting of all non-white people) is the oppressed class. This theory considered the United States to be the leader of this European overclass, as outlined in their 1966 document World Black Revolution:

The United States is leader of this counter-revolutionary alliance of: Britain, France, Germany, Soviet Union, Portugal, Belgium and the European countries. Though on the surface they appear dis-united, underground, behind closed doors, in secret conferences, the pact of their “White Holy Alliance” is “never let the Black Revolution succeed.”

Furthermore, this theory proposes that there exists two international nations: the white nation, consisting of the European overclass, and the black nation, consisting of the black underclass.

=== World black revolution ===
Revolutionary black internationalism advocates for a "world black revolution", in which the black underclass would destroy Western civilisation to end the exploitation of man by man. To coordinate this world black revolution, RAM advocated for the creation of a People's Liberation Army on a worldwide scale. In World Black Revolution (1966), RAM states "In order for the World Black Revolution to be successful, all non-white peoples must unite to destroy the existing white powers."

== See also ==
- Black radical tradition
- Maoism–Third Worldism
- Decoloniality
- Négritude
- Critical race theory
- New Communist movement
- Settlers: The Mythology of the White Proletariat
