= Revolutionary Action Movement =

US-based revolutionary black nationalist group

- Abbreviation: RAM
- Leader: Muhammad Ahmad (formerly Max Stanford); Donald Freeman
- Founded: 1962; 64 years ago
- Dissolved: 1968
- Headquarters: Philadelphia, Pennsylvania
- Newspaper: Black America
- Ideology: Revolutionary black internationalism; Anti-racism; Marxism–Leninism; Maoism; Third Worldism
- Political position: Far-left

Revolutionary Action Movement (RAM) was a Marxist–Leninist, black nationalist organisation that was active from 1962 to 1968. It was the first group to apply the philosophy of Maoism to conditions of black people in the United States and informed the revolutionary politics of the Black Power movement. RAM was the only secular political organization that Malcolm X joined prior to 1964. The group's political formation deeply influenced the politics of Huey Newton, Bobby Seale, and many other future influential Black Panther Party founders and members.

== Group formation ==
In 1961, students at Central State University, a historically black university in Ohio, came together to form "Challenge", a small conglomerate group of Students for a Democratic Society (SDS), Congress of Racial Equality (CORE), and Student Nonviolent Coordinating Committee (SNCC). Largely made up of formerly expelled students and veteran activists, Challenge was created to further political awareness, particularly in relation to the black community. At the request of Donald Freeman, who was enrolled at Case Western Reserve University at the time, Challenge read Harold Cruse's 1962 essay "Revolutionary Nationalism and the Afro-American" and thereafter shifted its focus from educating their participants to creating a mass black working-class nationalist movement in the North. After this drastic change of agenda, Challenge soon evolved into the Reform Action Movement, as they believed use of the word revolutionary would stir fear in the university administration. Led by Freeman, Wanda Marshall, and Maxwell Stanford, RAM became a study/action group that hoped to turn the Civil Rights Movement into a worldwide black revolution.

=== Leadership ===
==== Max Stanford ====
Max Stanford (now Muhammad Ahmad) was one of the founding members of RAM, and served as both its national chairman and Philadelphia head for much of the group's existence. He was a Philadelphia native, and one of James and Grace Lee Boggs' "adopted" kids, youth who spent a lot of time at the Boggs household and connected with their circle of activists. Prior to joining them, Stanford had been involved with militant civil rights activism since his teenage years. Through the lively discussions of revolutionary politics that thrived in the Boggs household, he developed a sharp critical consciousness and an impressive grasp of theory by adulthood. In 1962, Stanford engaged with Malcolm X and told him he was a revolutionary interested in following Malcolm in the Nation of Islam. Malcolm told Stanford that if he was truly revolutionary, he would be better off working outside the NOI.

==== Donald Freeman ====
Don Freeman was black student at Case Western who originally organized Challenge at Central State and then went on to be one of the leaders of the Cleveland branch of RAM. He questioned, however, during RAM's early years, the validity of RAM as a Marxist organization since traditional Marxist theory focused on class, while ignoring racism. So although Freeman believed in collectively owned black enterprises, he also argued that white "socialists and Marxists do not possess the solutions to the ills of black America".

== Structure ==
Though it initially started as a small student group at Central State College and Case Western Reserve University in Ohio, RAM at its peak had chapters all over the nation. The full spread of RAM remains hard to discern because RAM was semi-clandestine in nature. Chapters in New York, Oakland, Cleveland, and Detroit went by pseudonyms so as to decrease public scrutiny, while the Philadelphia chapter continued to operate under RAM's name. The decision to go underground was made by leadership after they judged that the ultra-right was preparing to crush the movement and that they could no longer be public without endangering noninvolved people and exposing them to violence.

RAM implemented a "system of rotating chairmen" to foster veteran leadership that would help educate the younger, less experienced members. There were three levels of membership in RAM. The first consisted of members who were "professional, full-time field organizers". The second level was made up of members who paid their dues to the organization and "met the standards for the main criteria for cadre". The third group included undisclosed members who only donated money to RAM.

The overall structure of RAM was organized into three types of cells or units: area units, work units, and political units. Area units were designed to gain community influence by organizing around local issues. Work units were set up in factories or other industrial type settings, and the League of Black Workers, the predecessor to the League of Revolutionary Black Workers, was eventually created through these units. Political units were used to gain access into the Civil Rights Movement and transform it into a movement for black liberation.

== Ideology ==
The Afroamerican revolutionary, being inside the citadel of world imperialism and being the Vanguard against the most highly developed capitalist complex has problems no other revolutionary has had. His position is so strategic that victory means the downfall of the arch enemy of the oppressed (U.S. imperialism) and the beginning of the birth of a new world. --"The African American War of National-Liberation," RAM's Black America

RAM was the first group in the United States to synthesize the thought of Marx, Lenin, Mao, and Malcolm X into a comprehensive theory of revolutionary black nationalism. They combined socialism, black nationalism, and Third World internationalism into a coherent and applicable theory that called for revolution "inside the citadel of world imperialism", meaning the United States.

The revolutionary nationalists of RAM believed that colonized peoples around the world must rise up and destroy the "universal slavemaster". They also believed that all people have a right to self-determination, including the "internal black colony" of the United States. In their opinion, African Americans had to gain control of land and political power through national liberation and establish revolutionary socialism in sovereign, liberated lands. They emphasized creating a black nation on land in Mississippi, Louisiana, Alabama, Georgia, Florida, Texas, Virginia, South Carolina, and North Carolina that, in their eyes, rightfully belonged to black people. This push for a sovereign black nation was in some ways a reiteration of an old black leftist line from the 1930s.

Many RAM activists derived their ideology from an older generation of revolutionary black leftists: Harry Haywood, Queen Mother Audley Moore, Harold Cruse, and Abner Berry as well as James Boggs and Grace Lee Boggs. Many of these older revolutionaries played a role of ideological and political mentorship to RAM activists.

In 1965, RAM published the essays The Relationship of Revolutionary Afro-American Movement to the Bandung Revolution and The World Black Revolution. The Relationship of Revolutionary Afro-American Movement to the Bandung Revolution described the de-colonial Bandung Conference as the beginning of an era of "Bandung humanism". "Bandung Humanism" was described as "revolutionary revision of Western or traditional Marxism to relate revolutionary ideology adequately to the unprecedented political, socio-economic technological, psycho-cultural developments occurring in the post World War II era. The World Black Revolution cast the Chinese communist revolution as the initial spark of the Bandung era. It also called for the organization of a "People's liberation army on a world scale".

=== Black internationalism ===
The revolutionary spirit of black Americans in the 1960s was by no means the sole example of rebellion in the world at that time. The decade brought forth revolutions and mass uprisings in countries all over the world, and though the people were protesting in different regions, most of these movements sought to achieve a similar goal: the universal elimination of racism and capitalism. Members of RAM understood that black nationalism, the formation of an independent nation of blacks in the US, was a concept inseparable from black internationalism, which had the goal of ending white supremacy through a conjoined effort of all oppressed groups to overthrow pan-European racism and the exploitative global capitalist system. The movement had a global vision, bigger than just the race relations of the United States. They saw the main battle as being between Western imperialism and the oppressed Third World within US borders and around the world. The context of black liberation was the entire world revolution, rather than cultural nationalism, which RAM considered reactionary and bourgeois. RAM members saw themselves as colonial subjects fighting a "colonial war at home".

The theory of black internationalism was first publicized in W. E. B. Du Bois's historical novel Dark Princess (1928), where he argues that the black nation in America is just one faction of what he refers to as the "Land of the Blacks", a conglomeration of all racially subjugated groups around the world. RAM spokesman Malcolm X later described the black revolution in the United States as part of a "worldwide struggle of the oppressed against the oppressor". Several other political figures openly supported black internationalism, calling for people to join the revolution and be fully in conjunction "with the people in the great struggle for Africa and of suffering humanity".

RAM was influenced by Maoist ideology

=== Influence of Maoism and Maoist ethics ===
Some RAM activists saw themselves as an all-black cadre of Mao's Red Army, and related their black freedom struggle to Mao's strategy of encircling capitalist countries to challenge imperialism. In solidarity and fighting alongside anti-colonial struggles in China, Zanzibar, Cuba, Vietnam, Indonesia, and Algeria, RAM activists saw themselves as playing a global role.

RAM modeled its Code of Cadres on the "Three Main Rules of Discipline" section of Quotations from Chairman Mao Zedong. When Robert F. Williams, chairman of RAM, came back from his exile in China, he also emphasized that all young black revolutionaries must "...undergo personal and moral transformation. There is a need for a stringent revolutionary code of moral ethics. Revolutionaries are instruments of righteousness."

RAM's text The World Black Revolution included Mao on its cover, along with Robert F. Williams.

RAM called for a "cultural revolution" of sorts: one that would purge the slave mentality from black people in the United States. They were for the creation of a new, revolutionary culture through the reclamation of African aesthetics, creation of art only in the service of the revolution, and active attempt to root out habits, traditions, customs, and philosophies taught to black people by white oppressors.

== Political activities ==
There were three main branches of RAM: the founding branch in Cleveland, Ohio; the headquarters branch in Philadelphia, Pennsylvania; and a west coast branch in Oakland, California. Though the branches all had different local goals and accomplished different things, RAM engaged in several unifying national political activities.

All branches helped distribute Robert Williams' magazine, The Crusader, after it had been banned within the United States. They also took a two-pronged approach to advocating their policies among other civil rights groups: disparaging those that did not advocate for armed self-defense and, simultaneously, infiltrating them to try to spread their revolutionary ideology.

Because RAM was made up of mostly college-educated intellectuals (though many dropped out to organize full-time), they thought a lot about who they were trying to mobilize, eventually settling upon the black petit bourgeoisie youth and black working-class youth. RAM thought that the black petit bourgeoisie particularly embodied the contradictions of racial capitalism, and if properly brought into the movement, this group could form a "revolutionary intelligentsia capable of leading black America to true liberation". They also used public street meetings to try to attract as many black working-class youth as possible to their organization, particularly gang members. RAM thought gang members had the most revolutionary potential of the population, because they could be trained to fight not against each other but against white power structures. They believed they could create a fighting force of former gang members on the model of the Congolese Youth guerrilla army and the Mau Mau guerrillas.

In mid-1965, before opposition to the Vietnam War gained momentum, RAM blazed an ideological trail, expressing solidarity with the Vietnamese National Liberation Front in their fight against imperialism. At the same time, RAM was explicitly anti-draft, arguing and organizing around the hypocrisy of drafting black Americans to fight in a war against, in their eyes, other people victimized by US imperialism.

The Black Guard was a national armed youth self-defense group run by RAM that argued for protecting the interests of black America by fighting directly against its enemies. The Black Guard, in Max Stanford's words, "[was] to stop our youth from fighting amongst themselves, teach them a knowledge of [black] history ... and prepare them ... to protect our community from racist attacks."

Everywhere except for Philadelphia, RAM operated as a semi-clandestine group, existing behind front organizations, and under multiple names and branches. Due to this underground status, RAM focused more on producing agitprop and less on actual community organizing. As a result, RAM has received less attention from historians than the Black Panther Party, even though they blazed the 1960s revolutionary black nationalist ideological trail and heavily influenced the Panthers.

Malcolm X became a RAM officer in 1964. Max Stanford has claimed that Malcolm X's Organization of Afro-American Unity (OAAU) was intended to be the popular front organization to RAM's underground black liberation army.

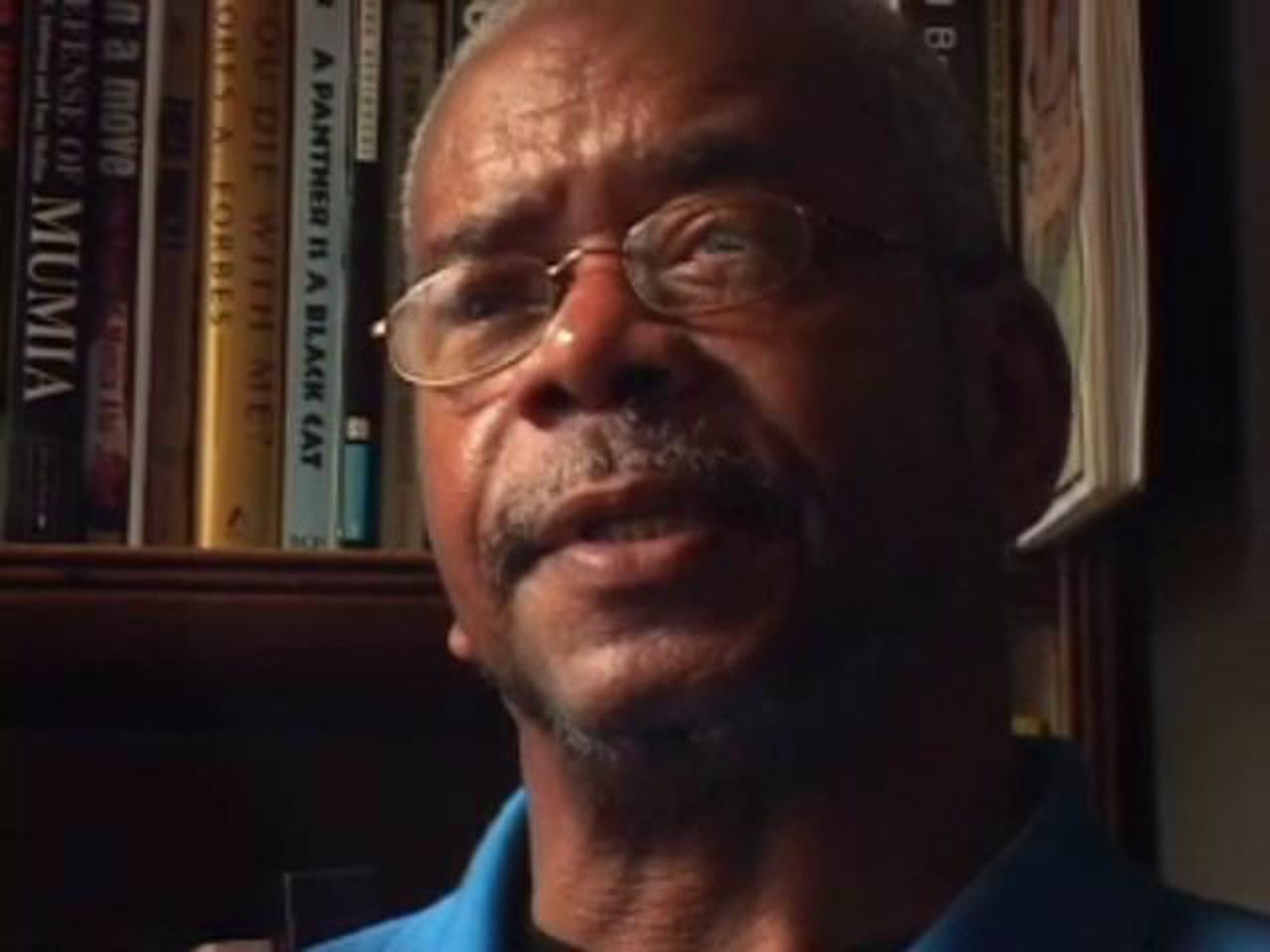
Muhammad Ahmad (formerly Maxwell Stanford), leader of RAM's Philadelphia branch, discussing the Black Power movement

=== Philadelphia ===
Despite numerous chapters all over the country, by 1964, RAM's home base in Philadelphia was the main branch available to the public eye. The Philadelphia chapter was responsible for the publication of RAM's bimonthly newspaper, Black America, and the single-page newsletter RAM Speaks. During their time in the city, RAM actively supported Leon Sullivan's 1962 selective patronage campaign. This was the beginning of the "don't buy where you can't work" method of direct boycott action that serves as an example of the effectiveness of the black masses to black liberation.

Throughout its existence, RAM supported mass action all over Philadelphia, canvassed to try to listen to community needs, and provided public services that they thought were lacking. These actions ranged from responding to local residents' medical emergencies to providing weekly black history classes. By making their presence known throughout the streets and establishing a consistent presence throughout black neighborhoods in the city, RAM was able to effectively mobilize people for anti-union discrimination protests in 1963.

RAM also advocated for the black students in Philadelphia's Bok High School in 1968 by providing protection and political education to students while they protested unequal conditions and a lack of community control in their educational environment.

=== Cleveland ===
In Cleveland, Ohio, RAM was governed by a secret committee named the "Soul Circle", which was essentially a small selection of black men involved in the local community, as well as civil rights, and student groups. In 1962, a policy-oriented think tank named the Afro-American Institute was founded in Cleveland. Through this organization, RAM members held free public lectures and worked with other activists to improve the black community in Cleveland. The following year, Max Stanford and other RAM members traveled to Cleveland and joined CORE to assist in demanding better healthcare for black hospital patients and more inclusion of Black history in the Cleveland public school curriculum.

The Afro-American Institute organized lectures by revolutionary black artists and intellectuals, and distributed leaflets to inform and inculcate the public in their revolutionary opinions. The subjects of the leaflets were wide-ranging, from elections to the arms race to the Black struggle. Eventually the leaflets became the newsletter Afropinion.

In Cleveland, RAM's most notable accomplishment was their open protestation against Mae Mallory's incarceration. Mallory was a Black woman arrested for her relationship with Robert F. Williams, the future international chairman of RAM who, at the time, had fled to Cuba after being exiled from the United States. Working with the institute and its allies, RAM petitioned the governor of Ohio to revoke the extradition warrant against Mallory and held a large demonstration in front of the county jail, insisting on Mallory's immediate release.

=== Northern California ===
RAM's Northern California branch operated under the name the "Soul Students' Advisory Council" and started after then-member of the Afro-American Association and future-Black Panther, Ernie Allen, went on a trip to Cuba in 1964. There Allen traveled alongside the future organizers of Uhuru, the Dodge Revolutionary Union Movement, and the League of Revolutionary Black Workers. He also coincidentally met and talked to Max Stanford, who was in Cuba visiting Robert Williams at the time. This confluence of events resulted in Allen establishing a branch of RAM in Oakland at Merritt College through the Soul Students' Advisory Council.

The Soul Students' Advisory Council published a widely distributed prose and poetry journal called Soulbook: The Revolutionary Journal of the Black World. It was a radical black culture magazine edited by future black power activists Bobby Seale, Huey Newton, and Ernie Allen, among others. The Soul Students' Advisory Council, in its interaction with RAM, exposed Seale and Newton to anti-imperialism, socialism, and revolutionary nationalism for the first time, which was critical in their political development.

== Political suppression ==
=== FBI and COINTELPRO ===
The purpose of this new counterintelligence endeavor is to expose, disrupt, misdirect, discredit, or otherwise neutralize the activities of black nationalist, hate-type organizations and groupings, their leadership, spokesmen, membership, and supporters, and to counter their propensity for violence and civil disorder ... Intensified action under this program should be afforded to the activities of ... Revolutionary Action Movement ... Particular emphasis should be given to extremists such as Stokely Carmichael, H. "Rap" Brown, Elijah Muhammad, and Maxwell Stanford.

— J. Edgar Hoover, 25 August 1967

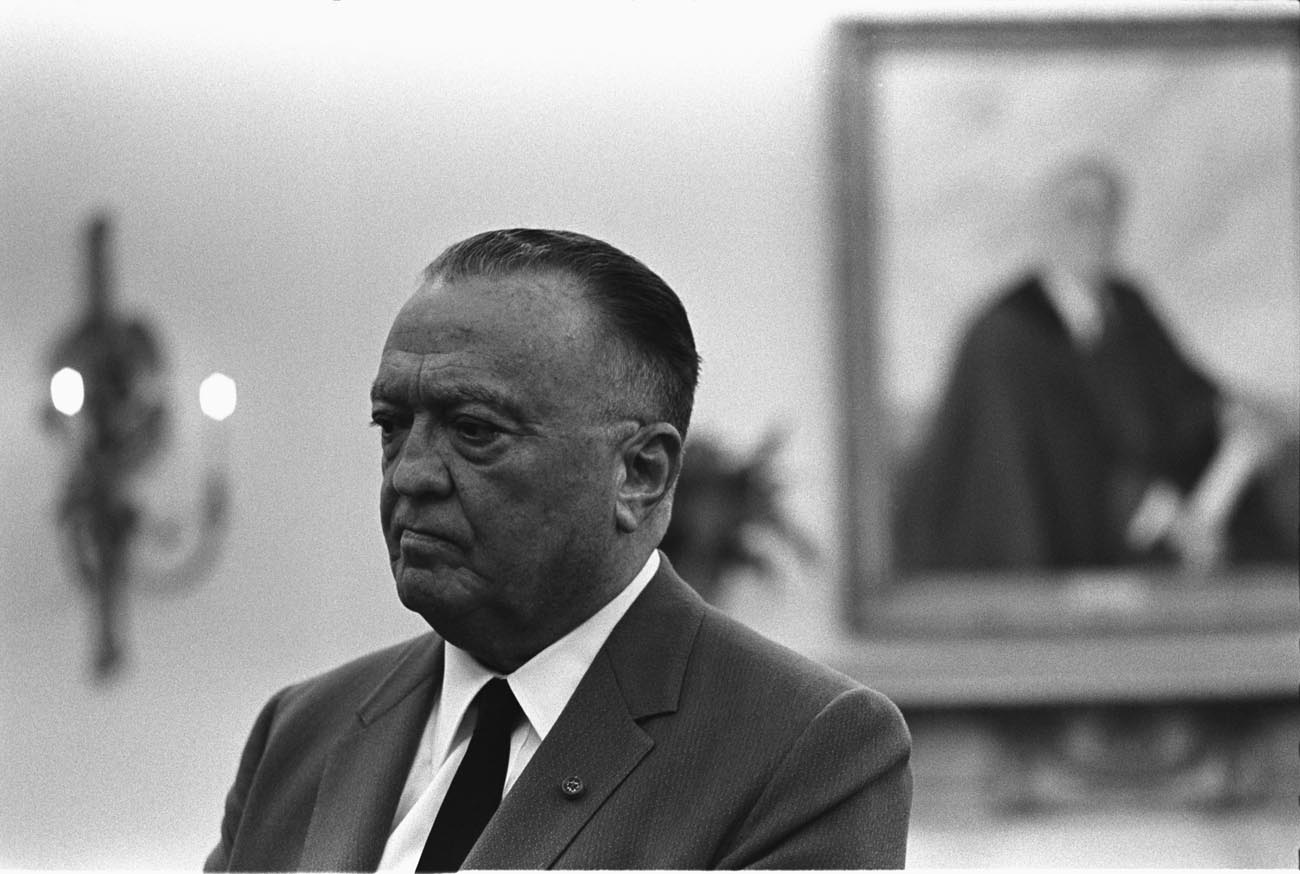
J. Edgar Hoover was instrumental in implementing COINTELPRO and dismantling Black Power groups

As exemplified by police repression of RAM in Philadelphia in the summer 1967, the FBI and their COINTELPRO program targeted RAM for political destruction. However, RAM was just one of many civil rights or black nationalist groups targeted because of their politics. Tactics used to suppress RAM were also used to suppress and target Student Nonviolent Coordinating Committee (SNCC), Southern Christian Leadership Conference (SCLC), Congress of Racial Equality (CORE), the Black Panther Party, the Nation of Islam, the National Welfare Rights Organization, Dodge Revolutionary Union Movement (DRUM), Republic of New Afrika (RNA), Congress of Afrikan People, black student unions at universities across the US, and black churches and community organizations.

In 1967, following an exposé on RAM in Life magazine, Max Stanford and 16 other RAM members were arrested on conspiracy charges and for allegedly plotting to assassinate the NAACP's Roy Wilkins and the Urban League's Whitney Young. Stanford went underground to avoid arrest and indictment, but the rest of the Queens 17, as they were called, went to trial and had to pay a $200,000 bail bond.

=== Dissolution of RAM ===
In this context of government repression, RAM transformed itself into the Black Liberation Army, and by 1969 had practically dissolved. Many of its members went back to their communities or joined other civil rights groups to continue pushing their ideology of black internationalism and armed self-defense.

== Criticisms of RAM ==
On multiple occasions, FBI director J. Edgar Hoover condemned RAM, describing the organization as a "militant black nationalist hate group". During its existence, RAM was the target of denigration from a wide range of critics, including Martin Luther King Jr.

=== Revisionism ===
Though RAM described itself as a Maoist organization, some scholars, such as Robin Kelley, have critiqued it for not sticking to Mao's philosophies. He writes: "Mao's insistence on the protracted nature of revolution was not taken to heart; at one point they suggested that the war for liberation would probably take ninety days. And because RAM's leaders focused their work on confronting the state head on and attacking black leaders whom they deemed reformists, they failed to build a strong base in black urban communities. Furthermore, despite their staunch internationalism, they did not reach out to other oppressed 'nationalities' in the United States."

Amidst the sectarianism of the New Left, other activists and black liberation organizations also criticized RAM. In particular, the Black Panther Party said that although RAM led the development of black nationalist thought in the US, examples of their application of revolutionary ideas was few and far between, and mostly limited to students, rather than the black underclass "lumpenproletariat" they claimed to represent. RAM often struggled to meld theory and practice.

== Notable members ==
- Malcolm X
- Robert F. Williams
- Bobby Seale
