= Bibliography of Maoism =

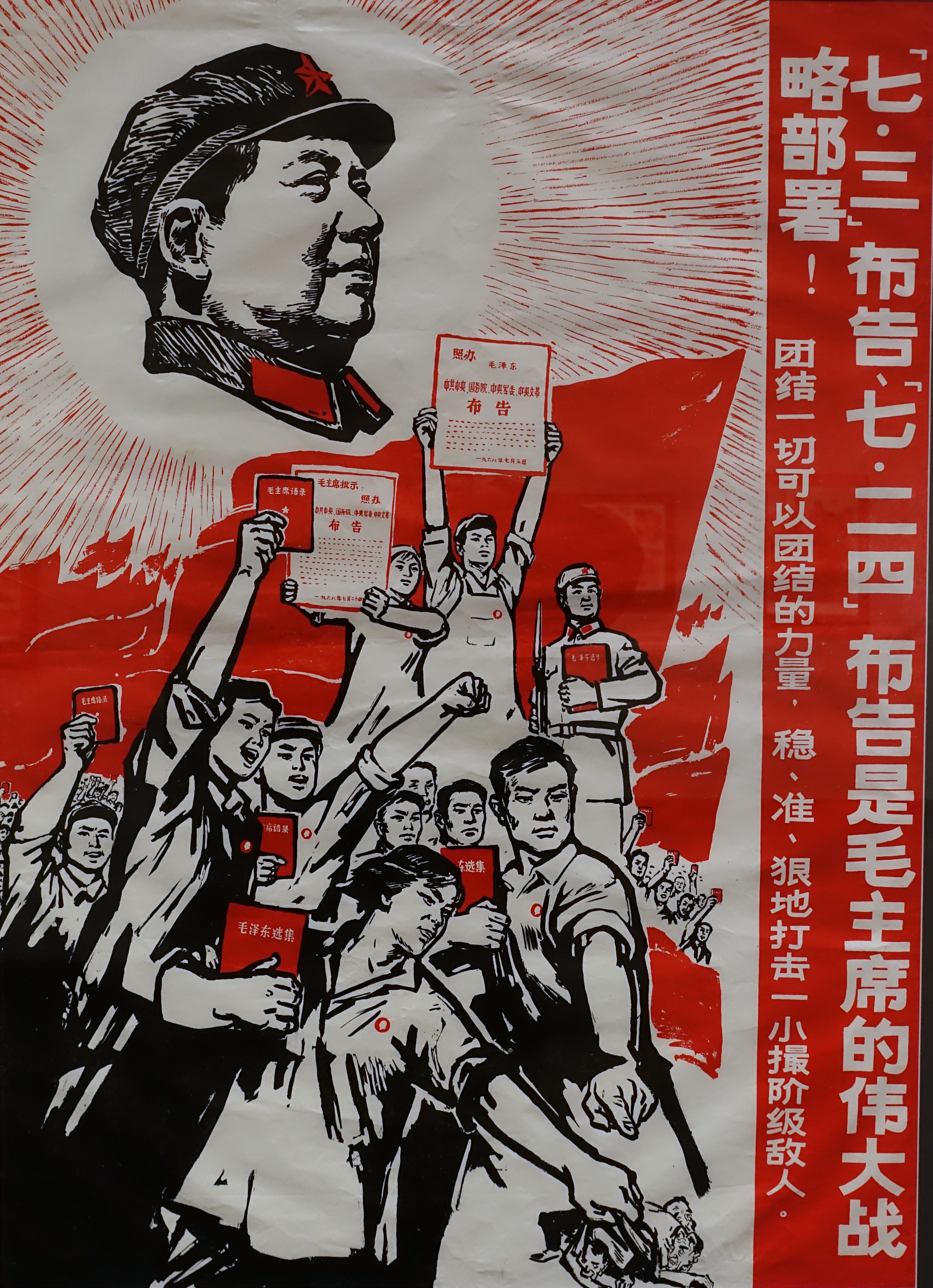
- Public Proclamations of July 3 and July 24 Are Chairman Mao's Great Strategic Plans!, lithograph, 1968
- Subject: Maoism
- Scope: Books, journal articles, primary sources
- Period covered: 1920s – present
- Languages: English
- Related: Bibliography of Chinese history; Bibliography of works by Mao Zedong

This is a select bibliography of academic-level books and journal articles about Maoism and its historical context.

Maoism, officially Mao Zedong Thought, (Note: The term "Maoism" originated with Mao's supporters; Mao himself rejected it and preferred "Mao Zedong Thought".) (Note: Before the adoption of pinyin, also written "Mao Tse-tung Thought", "Mao Tse Tung Thought" or "Mao Tsetung Thought", and abbreviated as "MTTT" or "MTT".) is a variety of Marxism–Leninism that Mao Zedong developed while trying to realise a socialist revolution in the agricultural, pre-industrial society of the Republic of China and later the People's Republic of China. One difference between Maoism and traditional Marxism–Leninism is that in pre-industrial societies, a united front of progressive forces in class society, rather than communist revolutionaries alone, would lead the revolutionary vanguard. This theory, in which revolutionary praxis is primary and ideological orthodoxy is secondary, purports to represent urban Marxism–Leninism adapted to pre-industrial China. Later theoreticians expanded on the idea that Mao had adapted Marxism–Leninism to Chinese conditions, arguing that he had in fact updated it fundamentally and that Maoism could be applied universally. This ideology is often called Marxism–Leninism–Maoism to distinguish it from Mao's original ideas.

This bibliography contains academic-level English-language books (including translations) and journal articles, published mainly after World War II. (Note: Works published before World War II should be limited to areas where there are no significant post–World War II books on the subject, or where the work in question has significant historical merit.) Book entries may have references to reviews published in academic journals or major newspapers when these could be considered helpful. These reference reviews also function as a resource to find other works on this subject.

Works listed here are cited in the notes or bibliographies of scholarly sources. Each is published by an academic or major trade press, written by a recognized expert, or substantially reviewed in scholarly journals; borderline cases are omitted. A selection of primary sources is included. Many of the books below carry their own bibliographies; see Further reading section for longer ones, and External links section for historical sites and museums.

Citations follow APA style. (Note: Entries are in plain text APA 7 format without templates; templates are used only for reviews and notes.) Books have citations to academic journal or mainstream published reviews when available. For books only partly about the subject, relevant chapter or section titles are given where useful and available. Translators of the original-language edition are included when possible. In cases where a title or name has appeared with more than one English spelling, the most recent published form is used and a footnote documents any earlier title under which the work appeared.

== History of Maoism ==
- Cheek, T. (Ed.). (2010). A critical introduction to Mao. Cambridge University Press. doi:10.1017/CBO9780511781476
- Chen, J. (2001). Mao's China and the Cold War. University of North Carolina Press.
- Dikötter, F. (2010). Mao's great famine: The history of China's most devastating catastrophe, 1958–62. Bloomsbury.
- Gao, M. (2008). The battle for China's past: Mao and the Cultural Revolution. Pluto Press.
- Karl, R. E. (2010). Mao Zedong and China in the twentieth-century world: A concise history. Duke University Press. doi:10.1215/9780822393023
- Lüthi, L. M. (2008). The Sino-Soviet split: Cold War in the communist world. Princeton University Press.
- Meisner, M. (1999). Mao's China and after: A history of the People's Republic (3rd ed.). Free Press.
- Meisner, M. (2007). Mao Zedong: A political and intellectual portrait. Polity.
- Pantsov, A. V., & Levine, S. I. (2012). Mao: The real story. Simon & Schuster.
- Schwartz, B. I. (1951). Chinese communism and the rise of Mao. Harvard University Press.
- Selden, M. (1971). The Yenan way in revolutionary China. Harvard University Press.
- Short, P. (1999). Mao: A life. Hodder & Stoughton.
- Yang, J. (2012). Tombstone: The great Chinese famine, 1958–1962 (E. Friedman, J. Guo, & S. Mosher, Eds.; S. Mosher & J. Guo, Trans.). Farrar, Straus and Giroux. (Original work published 2008)

== Maoism in theory ==
- Apter, D. E., & Saich, T. (1994). Revolutionary discourse in Mao's republic. Harvard University Press.
- Ci, J. (1994). Dialectic of the Chinese revolution: From utopianism to hedonism. Stanford University Press.
- Dirlik, A., Healy, P., & Knight, N. (Eds.). (1997). Critical perspectives on Mao Zedong's thought. Humanities Press.
- Holm, D. (1991). Art and ideology in revolutionary China. Clarendon Press.
- Katzenbach, E. L., & Hanrahan, G. Z. (1955). The revolutionary strategy of Mao Tse-tung. Political Science Quarterly, 70(3), 321–340. JSTOR 2145469
- Knight, N. (2005). Marxist philosophy in China: From Qu Qiubai to Mao Zedong, 1923–1945. Springer.
- Knight, N. (2007). Rethinking Mao: Explorations in Mao Zedong's thought. Lexington Books. doi:10.5771/9780739160312
- Knight, N. (Ed.). (1990). Mao Zedong on dialectical materialism: Writings on philosophy, 1937. M. E. Sharpe.
- Kraus, R. C. (1981). Class conflict in Chinese socialism. Columbia University Press.
- Lin, C. (2006). The transformation of Chinese socialism. Duke University Press. doi:10.1215/9780822388364
- Mao, T. (1961). Mao Tse-tung on guerrilla warfare (S. B. Griffith, Trans.). Praeger.
- Meisner, M. (1982). Marxism, Maoism, and utopianism: Eight essays. University of Wisconsin Press.
- Russo, A. (2020). Cultural Revolution and revolutionary culture. Duke University Press. doi:10.1215/9781478012184
- Schram, S. R. (1989). The thought of Mao Tse-tung. Cambridge University Press. doi:10.1017/CBO9780511521454
- Schram, S. R. (Ed.). (1963). The political thought of Mao Tse-tung. Praeger.
- Schram, S. R. (Ed.). (1992). Mao's road to power: Revolutionary writings 1912–1949: Vol. 1. The pre-Marxist period, 1912–1920. M. E. Sharpe.
- Starr, J. B. (1979). Continuing the revolution: The political thought of Mao. Princeton University Press.
- Tsou, T. (1986). The Cultural Revolution and post-Mao reforms: A historical perspective. University of Chicago Press.
- Wakeman, F., Jr. (1973). History and will: Philosophical perspectives of Mao Tse-tung's thought. University of California Press.
- Womack, B. (1982). The foundations of Mao Zedong's political thought, 1917–1935. University Press of Hawaii.
- Wylie, R. F. (1980). The emergence of Maoism: Mao Tse-tung, Ch'en Po-ta, and the search for Chinese theory, 1935–1945. Stanford University Press.

== Maoism in practice ==
- Clark, P. (2008). The Chinese Cultural Revolution: A history. Cambridge University Press.
- Friedman, E., Pickowicz, P. G., & Selden, M. (1991). Chinese village, socialist state. Yale University Press.
- Heilmann, S., & Perry, E. J. (Eds.). (2011). Mao's invisible hand: The political foundations of adaptive governance in China. Harvard University Asia Center.
- Hershatter, G. (2011). The gender of memory: Rural women and China's collective past. University of California Press.
- Leese, D. (2011). Mao cult: Rhetoric and ritual in China's Cultural Revolution. Cambridge University Press. doi:10.1017/CBO9780511984754
- MacFarquhar, R., & Schoenhals, M. (2006). Mao's last revolution. Belknap Press of Harvard University Press.
- Walder, A. G. (2009). Fractured rebellion: The Beijing Red Guard movement. Harvard University Press.
- Walder, A. G. (2015). China under Mao: A revolution derailed. Harvard University Press.
- Wu, Y. (2014). The Cultural Revolution at the margins: Chinese socialism in crisis. Harvard University Press.

== Maoism outside China ==
- Alexander, R. J. (1999). International Maoism in the developing world. Praeger.
- Alexander, R. J. (2001). Maoism in the developed world. Praeger.
- Brazinsky, G. A. (2017). Winning the Third World: Sino-American rivalry during the Cold War. University of North Carolina Press. doi:10.5149/northcarolina/9781469631707.001.0001
- Chen, J., Klimke, M., Kirasirova, M., Nolan, M., Young, M., & Waley-Cohen, J. (Eds.). (2018). The Routledge handbook of the global sixties: Between protest and nation-building. Routledge. doi:10.4324/9781315150918
- Cook, A. C. (Ed.). (2014). Mao's Little Red Book: A global history. Cambridge University Press. doi:10.1017/CBO9781107298576
- Friedman, J. (2015). Shadow Cold War: The Sino-Soviet competition for the Third World. University of North Carolina Press.
- Galway, M. (2022). The emergence of global Maoism: China's Red Evangelism and the Cambodian Communist Movement, 1949–1979. Cornell University Press.
- Lovell, J. (2016). The Cultural Revolution and its legacies in international perspective. The China Quarterly, 227, 632–652. doi:10.1017/S0305741016000722
- Lovell, J. (2019). Maoism: A global history. Bodley Head.
- Plys, K. (2025). The Cold War from the Global South: Maoism and the future of liberalism. Social Science History, 49(4), 933–960. doi:10.1017/ssh.2024.22

=== Africa ===
- Eisenman, J. (2018). Comrades-in-arms: The Chinese Communist Party's relations with African political organisations in the Mao era, 1949–76. Cold War History. doi:10.1080/14682745.2018.1440549
- Larkin, B. D. (1971). China and Africa, 1949–1970: The foreign policy of the People's Republic of China. University of California Press.
- Snow, P. (1988). The star raft: China's encounter with Africa. Weidenfeld & Nicolson.

=== Albania ===
- Biberaj, E. (1986). Albania and China: A study of an unequal alliance. Westview Press.
- Mëhilli, E. (2017). From Stalin to Mao: Albania and the socialist world. Cornell University Press.

=== Burma ===
- Lintner, B. (1990). The rise and fall of the Communist Party of Burma (CPB). Cornell University Southeast Asia Program.

=== Cambodia ===
- Becker, E. (1986). When the war was over: The voices of Cambodia's revolution and its people. Simon & Schuster.
- Chandler, D. P. (1991). The tragedy of Cambodian history: Politics, war, and revolution since 1945. Yale University Press.
- Chandler, D. P. (1992). Brother number one: A political biography of Pol Pot. Westview Press.
- Jackson, K. D. (Ed.). (1989). Cambodia, 1975–1978: Rendezvous with death. Princeton University Press.
- Kiernan, B. (1985). How Pol Pot came to power: A history of communism in Kampuchea, 1930–1975. Verso.
- Kiernan, B. (1996). The Pol Pot regime: Race, power, and genocide in Cambodia under the Khmer Rouge, 1975–79. Yale University Press.
- Short, P. (2004). Pol Pot: The history of a nightmare. John Murray.

=== Ethiopia ===
- Bahru Zewde. (2014). The quest for socialist utopia: The Ethiopian student movement, c. 1960–1974. James Currey.

=== France ===
- Bosteels, B. (2005). Post-Maoism: Badiou and politics. positions: asia critique, 13(3), 575–634. doi:10.1215/10679847-13-3-575
- Bourg, J. (2005). The Red Guards of Paris: French student Maoism of the 1960s. History of European Ideas, 31(4), 472–490. doi:10.1016/j.histeuroideas.2004.09.001
- Bourg, J. (2007). From revolution to ethics: May 1968 and contemporary French thought. McGill-Queen's University Press.
- Huang, X. (2024). Translating "Maoist China": The development of French Maoism through literary translation. Contemporary French and Francophone Studies, 28(1), 124–131. doi:10.1080/17409292.2024.2272521
- Ross, K. (2002). May '68 and its afterlives. University of Chicago Press.
- Wolin, R. (2010). The wind from the East: French intellectuals, the Cultural Revolution, and the legacy of the 1960s. Princeton University Press.

=== India ===
- Banerjee, S. (1984). India's simmering revolution: The Naxalite uprising. Zed Books.
- Chakrabarty, B., & Kujur, R. K. (2010). Maoism in India: Reincarnation of ultra-left wing extremism in the twenty-first century. Routledge. doi:10.4324/9780203866481
- Dasgupta, B. (1974). The Naxalite movement. Allied Publishers.
- Kennedy, J., & Purushotham, S. (2012). Beyond Naxalbari: A comparative analysis of Maoist insurgency and counterinsurgency in independent India. Comparative Studies in Society and History, 54(4), 832–862. doi:10.1017/S0010417512000436
- Kunnath, G. J. (2012). Rebels from the mud houses: Dalits and the making of the Maoist revolution in Bihar. Social Science Press.
- Mohanty, M. (1977). Revolutionary violence: A study of the Maoist movement in India. Sterling.
- Shah, A. (2018). Nightmarch: Among India's revolutionary guerrillas. Hurst.
- Singh, P. (1995). The Naxalite movement in India. Rupa.
- Sundar, N. (2016). The burning forest: India's war in Bastar. Juggernaut Books.

=== Indonesia ===
- Zhou, T. (2019). Migration in the time of revolution: China, Indonesia, and the Cold War. Cornell University Press.

=== Iran ===
- Behrooz, M. (1999). Rebels with a cause: The failure of the left in Iran. I. B. Tauris.

=== Italy ===
- Gabbas, M. (2022). Maoism, political violence and terrorism in Italy. Terrorism and Political Violence, 34(8), 1617–1631. doi:10.1080/09546553.2020.1824911

=== Japan ===
- Esselstrom, E. (2015). Red Guards and salarymen: The Chinese Cultural Revolution and comic satire in 1960s Japan. The Journal of Asian Studies, 74(4), 953–976. doi:10.1017/S0021911815001096
- Simon, S. W. (1968). Maoism and inter-party relations: Peking's alienation of the Japan Communist Party. The China Quarterly, 35, 40–57. doi:10.1017/S0305741000032094

=== Latin America ===
- Puma, J. (2022). The Nazas-Aguanaval Group: Radical priests, Catholic networks, and Maoist politics in northern Mexico. The Americas, 79(2), 291–320. doi:10.1017/tam.2021.141
- Rothwell, M. (2016). Secret agent for international Maoism: José Venturelli, Chinese informal diplomacy and Latin American Maoism. Radical Americas, 1(1), 44–62. doi:10.14324/111.444.ra.2016.v1.1.005
- Rothwell, M. D. (2013). Transpacific revolutionaries: The Chinese Revolution in Latin America. Routledge.

=== Nepal ===
- Adhikari, A. (2014). The bullet and the ballot box: The story of Nepal's Maoist revolution. Verso.
- Hutt, M. (Ed.). (2004). Himalayan 'People's War': Nepal's Maoist rebellion. Hurst.
- Lawoti, M., & Pahari, A. K. (Eds.). (2010). The Maoist insurgency in Nepal: Revolution in the twenty-first century. Routledge. doi:10.4324/9780203869390
- Lecomte-Tilouine, M. (2009). Hindu kingship, ethnic revival, and Maoist rebellion in Nepal. Oxford University Press.
- Lecomte-Tilouine, M. (Ed.). (2013). Revolution in Nepal: An anthropological and historical approach to the People's War. Oxford University Press. doi:10.1093/acprof:oso/9780198089384.001.0001
- Pettigrew, J. (2013). Maoists at the hearth: Everyday life in Nepal's civil war. University of Pennsylvania Press. doi:10.9783/9780812207897
- Thapa, D., & Sijapati, B. (2003). A kingdom under siege: Nepal's Maoist insurgency, 1996 to 2003. The Printhouse.
- Zharkevich, I. (2019). Maoist people's war and the revolution of everyday life in Nepal. Cambridge University Press. doi:10.1017/9781108609210

=== Norway ===
- Sjøli, H. P. (2008). Maoism in Norway: And how the AKP(m–l) made Norway more Norwegian. Scandinavian Journal of History, 33(4), 478–490. doi:10.1080/03468750802519982

=== Oman ===
- Takriti, A. R. (2013). Monsoon revolution: Republicans, sultans, and empires in Oman, 1965–1976. Oxford University Press. doi:10.1093/acprof:oso/9780199674435.001.0001

=== Peru ===
- Degregori, C. I. (2012). How difficult it is to be God: Shining Path's politics of war in Peru, 1980–1999 (S. J. Stern, Ed.; N. Appelbaum et al., Trans.). University of Wisconsin Press. (Original work published 2010)
- Gorriti, G. (1999). The Shining Path: A history of the millenarian war in Peru (R. Kirk, Trans.). University of North Carolina Press. (Original work published 1990)
- Heilman, J. P. (2010). Before the Shining Path: Politics in rural Ayacucho, 1895–1980. Stanford University Press.
- La Serna, M. (2012). The corner of the living: Ayacucho on the eve of the Shining Path insurgency. University of North Carolina Press.
- McClintock, C. (1998). Revolutionary movements in Latin America: El Salvador's FMLN and Peru's Shining Path. United States Institute of Peace Press.
- Palmer, D. S. (Ed.). (1992). The Shining Path of Peru. St. Martin's Press.
- Starn, O. (1991). Missing the revolution: Anthropologists and the war in Peru. Cultural Anthropology, 6(1), 63–91. doi:10.1525/can.1991.6.1.02a00030
- Starn, O., & La Serna, M. (2019). The Shining Path: Love, madness, and revolution in the Andes. W. W. Norton.
- Stern, S. J. (Ed.). (1998). Shining and other paths: War and society in Peru, 1980–1995. Duke University Press. doi:10.1215/9780822398059
- Strong, S. (1992). Shining Path: The world's deadliest revolutionary force. HarperCollins.
- Theidon, K. (2013). Intimate enemies: Violence and reconciliation in Peru. University of Pennsylvania Press.

=== Philippines ===
- Abinales, P. N. (Ed.). (1996). The revolution falters: The left in Philippine politics after 1986. Cornell University Southeast Asia Program.
- Jones, G. R. (1989). Red revolution: Inside the Philippine guerrilla movement. Westview Press.
- Rocamora, J. (1994). Breaking through: The struggle within the Communist Party of the Philippines. Anvil.
- Rutten, R. (Ed.). (2008). Brokering a revolution: Cadres in a Philippine insurgency. Ateneo de Manila University Press.
- Scalice, J. (2021). The geopolitical alignments of diverging social interests: The Sino-Soviet split and the Partido Komunista ng Pilipinas, 1966–1967. Critical Asian Studies, 53(1), 45–70. doi:10.1080/14672715.2020.1870867
- Scalice, J. (2023). The drama of dictatorship: Martial law and the communist parties of the Philippines. Cornell University Press. doi:10.1353/book.102934
- Weekley, K. (2001). The Communist Party of the Philippines, 1968–1993: A story of its theory and practice. University of the Philippines Press.

=== Tanzania ===
- Burgess, G. T. (2009). Race, revolution, and the struggle for human rights in Zanzibar: The memoirs of Ali Sultan Issa and Seif Sharif Hamad. Ohio University Press.
- Lal, P. (2015). African socialism in postcolonial Tanzania: Between the village and the world. Cambridge University Press. doi:10.1017/CBO9781316221679
- Monson, J. (2009). Africa's freedom railway: How a Chinese development project changed lives and livelihoods in Tanzania. Indiana University Press.

=== Turkey ===
- Özcan, N. A., & Bural, E. B. (2025). Contributing factors to PKK's failure to implement Mao's protracted people's war strategy. Small Wars & Insurgencies, 36(6), 1207–1249. doi:10.1080/09592318.2025.2501984

=== United States ===
- Elbaum, M. (2002). Revolution in the air: Sixties radicals turn to Lenin, Mao and Che. Verso.
- Frazier, R. T. (2015). The East is black: Cold War China in the Black radical imagination. Duke University Press. doi:10.1215/9780822376095
- Kelley, R. D. G., & Esch, B. (1999). Black like Mao: Red China and Black revolution. Souls, 1(4), 6–41. doi:10.1080/10999949909362183
- Lanza, F. (2017). The end of concern: Maoist China, activism, and Asian studies. Duke University Press. doi:10.1215/9780822372431
- Maeda, D. J. (2009). Chains of Babylon: The rise of Asian America. University of Minnesota Press.
- Pulido, L. (2006). Black, brown, yellow, and left: Radical activism in Los Angeles. University of California Press. doi:10.1525/9780520938892
- Wu, J. T.-C. (2013). Radicals on the road: Internationalism, orientalism, and feminism during the Vietnam era. Cornell University Press.

=== Vietnam ===
- Chen, J. (1995). China's involvement in the Vietnam War, 1964–69. The China Quarterly, 142, 356–387. doi:10.1017/S0305741000034974
- Zhai, Q. (2000). China and the Vietnam wars, 1950–1975. University of North Carolina Press.

=== West Germany ===
- Gehrig, S. (2011). (Re-)configuring Mao: Trajectories of a culturo-political trend in West Germany. Transcultural Studies, (2), 189–231. doi:10.11588/ts.2011.2.9072
- Klimke, M. (2010). The other alliance: Student protest in West Germany and the United States in the global sixties. Princeton University Press.
- Slobodian, Q. (2012). Foreign front: Third World politics in sixties West Germany. Duke University Press. doi:10.1215/9780822395041

== Biographical ==
- Byron, J., & Pack, R. (1992). The claws of the dragon: Kang Sheng, the evil genius behind Mao and his legacy of terror in People's China. Simon & Schuster.
- Chen, J. (2024). Zhou Enlai: A life. Harvard University Press.
- Dittmer, L. (1974). Liu Shao-ch'i and the Chinese Cultural Revolution: The politics of mass criticism. University of California Press.
- Domes, J. (1985). Peng Te-huai: The man and the image. Stanford University Press.
- Jin, Q. (1999). The culture of power: The Lin Biao incident in the Cultural Revolution. Stanford University Press. doi:10.1515/9780804764247
- La Serna, M., & Starn, O. (2023). Beyond the Gonzalo mystique: Challenges to Abimael Guzmán's leadership inside Peru's Shining Path, 1982–1992. Latin American Research Review, 58(4), 743–761. doi:10.1017/lar.2023.25
- Roy, A. K. (1979). Charu Mazumdar: Man and ideas. China Report, 15(4), 3–16. doi:10.1177/000944557901500401
- Teiwes, F. C., & Sun, W. (1996). The tragedy of Lin Biao: Riding the tiger during the Cultural Revolution, 1966–1971. Hurst.
- Terrill, R. (1984). The white-boned demon: A biography of Madame Mao Zedong. William Morrow.
- Tyson, T. B. (1999). Radio free Dixie: Robert F. Williams and the roots of Black power. University of North Carolina Press.
- Witke, R. (1977). Comrade Chiang Ch'ing. Little, Brown.

== Miscellaneous ==
- Andrews, J. F. (1995). Painters and politics in the People's Republic of China, 1949–1979. University of California Press.
- Evans, H., & Donald, S. (Eds.). (1999). Picturing power in the People's Republic of China: Posters of the Cultural Revolution. Rowman & Littlefield.
- Hung, C.-T. (2011). Mao's new world: Political culture in the early People's Republic. Cornell University Press. doi:10.7591/9780801462238
- Riskin, C. (1987). China's political economy: The quest for development since 1949. Oxford University Press.
- Schmalzer, S. (2015). Red revolution, green revolution: Scientific farming in socialist China. University of Chicago Press. doi:10.7208/chicago/9780226330297.001.0001
- Shapiro, J. (2001). Mao's war against nature: Politics and the environment in revolutionary China. Cambridge University Press. doi:10.1017/CBO9780511512063
- Stacey, J. (1983). Patriarchy and socialist revolution in China. University of California Press.
- Wang, Z. (2016). Finding women in the state: A socialist feminist revolution in the People's Republic of China, 1949–1964. University of California Press. doi:10.1525/california/9780520292284.001.0001
- Zuo, J. (1991). Political religion: The case of the Cultural Revolution in China. Sociological Analysis, 52(1), 99–110. JSTOR 3710718

== Historiography and memory ==
=== Historiography ===
- Dirlik, A. (1983). The predicament of Marxist revolutionary consciousness: Mao Zedong, Antonio Gramsci, and the reformulation of Marxist revolutionary theory. Modern China, 9(2), 182–211. doi:10.1177/009770048300900202
- Dirlik, A. (2012). Mao Zedong in contemporary Chinese official discourse and history. China Perspectives, 2012(2), 17–27. doi:10.4000/chinaperspectives.5852
- Goldman, R. (1968). Mao, Maoism and Mao-ology. Pacific Affairs, 41(4), 560–574. JSTOR 2754566
- Harding, H. (1982). From China, with disdain: New trends in the study of China. Asian Survey, 22(10), 934–958. JSTOR 2643753
- Joseph, W. A. (1984). The critique of ultra-leftism in China, 1958–1981. Stanford University Press.
- Perry, E. J. (2007). Studying Chinese politics: Farewell to revolution? The China Journal, 57, 1–22. doi:10.1086/tcj.57.20066239
- Scharping, T. (1994). The man, the myth, the message – New trends in Mao-literature from China. The China Quarterly, 137, 168–179. doi:10.1017/S0305741000034093
- Schram, S. R. (1984). Mao studies: Retrospect and prospect. The China Quarterly, 97, 95–125. doi:10.1017/S0305741000008547
- Schwartz, B. (1960). The legend of the "legend of 'Maoism'". The China Quarterly, 2, 35–42. doi:10.1017/S0305741000022797
- Starr, J. B. (1986). "Good Mao", "bad Mao": Mao studies and the re-evaluation of Mao's political thought. The Australian Journal of Chinese Affairs, 16, 1–6. JSTOR 2158772
- Unger, J. (Ed.). (1993). Using the past to serve the present: Historiography and politics in contemporary China. M. E. Sharpe.
- Walder, A. G. (1987). Actually existing Maoism. The Australian Journal of Chinese Affairs, 18, 155–166. JSTOR 2158588
- Weigelin-Schwiedrzik, S. (1987). Party historiography in the People's Republic of China. The Australian Journal of Chinese Affairs, 17, 77–94. JSTOR 2158969
- Wilson, D. (Ed.). (1977). Mao Tse-tung in the scales of history: A preliminary assessment organized by The China Quarterly. Cambridge University Press.
- Wittfogel, K. A. (1960a). The legend of "Maoism" [Part 1]. The China Quarterly, 1, 72–86. doi:10.1017/S0305741000022712
- Wittfogel, K. A. (1960b). The legend of "Maoism" (concluded). The China Quarterly, 2, 16–34. doi:10.1017/S0305741000022785

=== Memory studies ===
- Barmé, G. R. (1996). Shades of Mao: The posthumous cult of the great leader. M. E. Sharpe.
- Denton, K. A. (2014). Exhibiting the past: Historical memory and the politics of museums in postsocialist China. University of Hawai'i Press. doi:10.21313/hawaii/9780824836870.001.0001
- Hinton, A. L. (2016). Man or monster? The trial of a Khmer Rouge torturer. Duke University Press. doi:10.1215/9780822373551
- Lee, C. K., & Yang, G. (Eds.). (2007). Re-envisioning the Chinese revolution: The politics and poetics of collective memories in reform China. Woodrow Wilson Center Press; Stanford University Press.
- Li, J. (2020). Utopian ruins: A memorial museum of the Mao era. Duke University Press. doi:10.1215/9781478012764
- Li, Y., Hu, Z. Y., & Zhang, C. Z. (2010). Red tourism: Sustaining communist identity in a rapidly changing China. Journal of Tourism and Cultural Change, 8(1–2), 101–119. doi:10.1080/14766825.2010.493939
- Milton, C. E. (2018). Conflicted memory: Military cultural interventions and the human rights era in Peru. University of Wisconsin Press.
- Milton, C. E. (Ed.). (2014). Art from a fractured past: Memory and truth-telling in post-Shining Path Peru. Duke University Press. doi:10.1215/9780822377467
- Misra, K. (2003). Neo-left and neo-right in post-Tiananmen China. Asian Survey, 43(5), 717–744. doi:10.1525/as.2003.43.5.717
- Mittler, B. (2012). A continuous revolution: Making sense of Cultural Revolution culture. Harvard University Asia Center.
- Perry, E. J. (2012). Anyuan: Mining China's revolutionary tradition. University of California Press. doi:10.1525/9780520954038
- Veg, S. (Ed.). (2019). Popular memories of the Mao era: From critical debate to reassessing history. Hong Kong University Press. doi:10.5790/hongkong/9789888390762.001.0001
- Wang, H. (2009). The end of the revolution: China and the limits of modernity. Verso.
- Weigelin-Schwiedrzik, S. (2003). Trauma and memory: The case of the Great Famine in the People's Republic of China (1959–1961). Historiography East and West, 1(1), 39–67. doi:10.1163/157018603763585249
- Yang, G. (2016). The Red Guard generation and political activism in China. Columbia University Press. doi:10.7312/yang14964

== Primary sources ==
Primary sources include documentary collections of the Chinese Communist Party and of Maoist movements outside China, English translations of works by Mao and other Maoist theorists, memoirs by participants, and official documents.

- Brandt, C., Schwartz, B. I., & Fairbank, J. K. (1952). A documentary history of Chinese communism. Harvard University Press.
- Chandler, D. P., Kiernan, B., & Boua, C. (Eds. & Trans.). (1988). Pol Pot plans the future: Confidential leadership documents from Democratic Kampuchea, 1976–1977. Yale University Southeast Asia Studies.
- Communist China 1955–1959: Policy documents with analysis. (1962). Harvard University Press.
- Compton, B. (1952). Mao's China: Party reform documents, 1942–44. University of Washington Press.
- Karki, A., & Seddon, D. (Eds.). (2003). The people's war in Nepal: Left perspectives. Adroit Publishers.
- Saich, T. (Ed.). (1996). The rise to power of the Chinese Communist Party: Documents and analysis. M. E. Sharpe.
- Schoenhals, M. (Ed.). (1996). China's Cultural Revolution, 1966–1969: Not a dinner party. M. E. Sharpe.
- Sen, S., Panda, D., & Lahiri, A. (Eds.). (1978). Naxalbari and after: A Frontier anthology. Kathashilpa.
- Starn, O., Degregori, C. I., & Kirk, R. (Eds.). (1995). The Peru reader: History, culture, politics. Duke University Press.

=== Works by ===
- Guerrero, A. (1971). Philippine society and revolution. Pulang Tala Publications.
- Kau, M. Y. M., & Leung, J. K. (Eds.). (1986). The writings of Mao Zedong, 1949–1976. M. E. Sharpe.
- Lin, P. (1965). Long live the victory of people's war! Foreign Languages Press.
- MacFarquhar, R., Cheek, T., & Wu, E. (Eds.). (1989). The secret speeches of Chairman Mao: From the Hundred Flowers to the Great Leap Forward. Council on East Asian Studies, Harvard University.
- Mao, T. (1965–1977). Selected works of Mao Tse-tung (Vols. 1–5). Foreign Languages Press.
- Mao, T. (1966). Basic tactics (S. R. Schram, Trans.). Praeger.
- Mao, T. (1966). Quotations from Chairman Mao Tse-tung. Foreign Languages Press.
- Mao, T. (1977). A critique of Soviet economics (M. Roberts, Trans.). Monthly Review Press.
- Mao, T. (1977). Five essays on philosophy. Foreign Languages Press.
- Mao, Z. (1990). Report from Xunwu (R. R. Thompson, Trans.). Stanford University Press.
- Mao, Z. (2007). On practice and contradiction (S. Žižek, Ed.). Verso.
- Schram, S. (Ed.). (1974). Chairman Mao talks to the people: Talks and letters, 1956–1971 (J. Chinnery & Tieyun, Trans.). Pantheon Books.

=== Memoirs ===
- Bennett, G. A., & Montaperto, R. N. (1971). Red Guard: The political biography of Dai Hsiao-ai. Doubleday.
- Gao, Y. (1987). Born red: A chronicle of the Cultural Revolution. Stanford University Press.
- Li, Z. (1994). The private life of Chairman Mao: The memoirs of Mao's personal physician (H.-C. Tai, Trans.). Random House.
- Liang, H., & Shapiro, J. (1983). Son of the revolution. Knopf.
- Ling, K. (1972). The revenge of heaven: Journal of a young Chinese. Putnam.
- Rittenberg, S., & Bennett, A. (1993). The man who stayed behind. Simon & Schuster.
- Sison, J. M., & Werning, R. (1989). The Philippine revolution: The leader's view. Crane Russak.
- Tyler, M. (1977). My years in an Indian prison. Gollancz.
- Yang, R. (1997). Spider eaters: A memoir. University of California Press.

=== Government documents ===
- Communist Party of China. (1965). The polemic on the general line of the international communist movement. Foreign Languages Press.
- Communist Party of China. (1969). The Ninth National Congress of the Communist Party of China (documents). Foreign Languages Press.
- Communist Party of China. (1981). Resolution on CPC history (1949–81). Foreign Languages Press.
- Government of Nepal, & Communist Party of Nepal (Maoist). (2006). Comprehensive agreement concluded between the Government of Nepal and the Communist Party of Nepal (Maoist).
- Important documents on the Great Proletarian Cultural Revolution in China. (1970). Foreign Languages Press.
- Planning Commission (India). (2008). Development challenges in extremist affected areas: Report of an expert group to Planning Commission. Government of India.
- Truth and Reconciliation Commission (Peru). (2014). Hatun Willakuy: Abbreviated version of the final report of the Peruvian Truth and Reconciliation Commission. International Center for Transitional Justice.

== See also ==
- Anti-revisionism
- Bibliography of Chinese history
- Bibliography of works by Mao Zedong
- Cultural Revolution
- Khmer Rouge
- Mao Zedong
- Maoism
- Maoism–Third Worldism
- Marxism–Leninism–Maoism
- Mass line
- Naxalite–Maoist insurgency
- Nepalese Civil War
- New Communist movement
- New Democracy
- People's war
- Revolutionary Internationalist Movement
- Shining Path
- Sino-Soviet split
- Three Worlds Theory
