= Maoist Internationalist Movement =

American communist group (1983–2008)

Party name with logos

The Maoist Internationalist Movement (MIM) was a clandestine revolutionary communist organization based primarily in the United States. MIM claimed to adhere to a radical ideology called "MIM Thought". MIM listed a sole PO box in Ann Arbor, Michigan as its mailing address. Contrary to most Maoist groups, which originated the traditional Communist Parties, the MIM was a product of elements of the American New Left student movement who formed the New Communist movement.

== History ==
MIM was founded as the Revolutionary Internationalist Movement (RIM) in 1983 from a group called RADACADS (for "RADical ACADemics") at Harvard University. It is not to be confused with the Revolutionary Internationalist Movement that was founded the following year in France by Maoist parties around the world, the most notable of which are Shining Path and Bob Avakian's RCPUSA.

== Publications ==
All of MIM's publications were anonymously written; authors do not sign their names to articles. Instead, writers used the moniker MC[X] (MIM Comrade X), where X is a number. This was reputedly to prevent their members and supporters from being known by the state and also to keep the focus on theoretical line and arguments rather than people and personal relationships.

MIM published a biweekly newspaper, MIM Notes, and had an occasional Spanish-language publication, Notas Rojas. MIM also published a theory journal titled MIM Theory, of which 14 were released up until 2001. MIM also published Maoist Sojourner, 'a monthly publication by and for Third World Maoist exiles,' which according to the MIM website, "died as a publication thanks in part to internal sabotage and quitters."

== Demise of MIM ==
A post on the MIM website titled "Where we are at theoretically at the end", dated February 15, 2008, appears to announce the end of MIM. The post states that there will be no further posts on the MIM website, and announces a postmortem website, MIM Lite. According to the 2/15/2008 post on the MIM website, "There will be no new content here, no more stepping on toes and no defense of political gains if any. 'MIM Lite' will take up the few leftover tasks." While it is not said explicitly that MIM no longer exists as an organization, this is strongly implied and there appears to be no new activity subsequent to the 2/15/2008 post. In May 2008 it was announced that MIM Lite would be retired. In August a new blog was announced, called MIM Defense, with the stated purpose to "defend the leaders of ex-MIM, the Maoist Internationalist Movement, people who continue on the course of the anti-war and anti-imperialist struggles." Statement from Henry Park about going aboveground Henry Park is stated to be the author of MIM Down and MIM Defense.

In January 2009, MIM's web host, The ETEXT Archives, ceased operations. The content formerly hosted by The ETEXT Archives, including MIM, is still available at the Maoist Internationalist Ministry of Prisons, and via the Internet Archive. MIM continues to publish articles at Wordpress.com. Henry Park attempted to recover the original feel of the etext website by relocating MIM Down from WordPress to mimdown.org.

MIM founder Henry Park died on May 17, 2011.

== Related organizations ==
The Maoist International Ministry of Prisons (MIM-Prisons) has continued to organize and has maintained its own website since the collapse of the Maoist Internationalist Party-America. In early 2016 an organization referring to itself as MIM-Orchid appeared on GitHub, publishing Proletarian Internationalist Notes (PINotes), which offers news, reviews and analysis from a Maoist global perspective.

The Revolutionary Anti-Imperialist Movement (RAIM) and its website anti-imperialism.org cites the Maoist Internationalist Movement as an influence. RAIM evolved from the Revolutionary Anti-Imperialist Information Network, and was originally intended to be the imperialist country mass organization of the Leading Light Communist Organization (LLCO) before these two organizations split. LLCO does not consider itself to be a Maoist organization, claiming to uphold a post-Maoist ideology called Leading Light Communism, explicitly distinguishing themselves from MIM Theory.

== See also ==
- Maoism–Third Worldism
- Settlers: The Mythology of the White Proletariat
