= Third World socialism =

Political umbrella term

Third World socialism is an umbrella term for many movements and governments of the 20th century—all variants of socialism—that have taken place in numerous less-developed countries. There have been many leaders of this practice and political philosophy which remained strong until at least the 1990s, including: Michel Aflaq, Salah al-Din al-Bitar, Zulfikar Ali Bhutto, Buddhadasa, Fidel Castro, Muammar Gaddafi, Doğan Avcıoğlu,Saddam Hussein, Juan Domingo Perón, Modibo Keïta, Walter Lini, Gamal Abdel Nasser, Jawaharlal Nehru, Kwame Nkrumah, Julius Nyerere, Sukarno, Ahmed Sékou Touré and other socialist leaders of the Third World who saw socialism as the answer to a strong and developed nation.

Third World socialism is made up of African socialism, Arab socialism, Buddhist socialism, Islamic socialism, Melanesian socialism, Nasserism, Peronism, and Nehruism. Gaddafi's version was more inspired in the ideas of Arab nationalism, direct democracy, strongman politics and national liberation struggle while Bhutto's was more Western-aligned and resembled, allied and inspired itself in the ideas of Western democratic socialism/social democracy and had membership in the Socialist International.

In the 21st century, a surge in leftist governments called the pink tide occurred in Latin America. Latin American socialism of the 21st century is an ideologically-specific form of Third Worldism. It incorporates anti-Americanism and a connection with the less-developed Eastern Europe and finds solidarity with other developing countries, including variants in the Arab world.

== African socialism ==
The leaders of African socialism were Julius Nyerere, first president of Tanzania after the independence, who coined the concept of Ujamaa and collectivized the land; Kwame Nkrumah, first president of Ghana, who was one of the fathers of the Non-Aligned Movement, praised state planning policies like the five-year plans and an agency for the regulation of cocoa exports and in several political speeches and writings developed his theory of African socialism; Modibo Keïta, father of Mali; and Ahmed Sékou Touré, father of Guinea.

== Arab socialism ==
The main figures of Arab socialism are Gamal Abdel Nasser, second president of Egypt, who nationalized the Suez Canal, and the Ba'ath Party, founded in Syria by Michel Aflaq, which gained popularity in the whole Arab world and reached the government in Syria (1963-2024) and Iraq (1963-2003). Arab socialism is defined as "a non-Marxist socialism adapted to the strong conservative Islamic roots of the Arab world". Arab socialism postulated the elimination of economic inequality and relied on economic planning and public ownership of the economy, and partly under Soviet influence, elements of Soviet socialism. It also promoted women's rights and the abolition of discrimination based on religion and religious denomination.

Noam Chomsky argued that the main trait shared by both Arab socialism and Marxist socialism was "the idea that the government has direct responsibility for the welfare of the people". Arab socialism mainly concerned itself with the liberation of the Arab nations from their exploitation by the West. The main characteristic of Marxism, liberation of the working class from its exploitation by the bourgeoisie, was also present in Arab socialism, but presented as something that can be realized by resisting Western imperialism and economic interests, as well as through religious Islamic rhetoric.

In the case of Nasser, his Arab socialist policy consisted of mass nationalizations, including the Suez Canal, as well as the pharmaceutical, cement, phosphate, and tobacco industries, hitherto owned by French and British concerns. Nasser also created new, state-owned enterprises, such as a national steel company. The main concern of Nasser, in line with Arab socialism, was "indigenizing" the Egyptian economy and safeguarding the political independence of Egypt, especially in the economic aspect. Some sectors, such as banking, overseas trade, and transportation, became entirely public-owned, while private investment was permitted in other sectors, such as mining, though limited to Egyptian citizens only in order to hinder foreign dependence.

== Middle Eastern socialism ==
Iran experienced a short Third World socialism period at the zenith of the Tudeh Party after the abdication of Reza Shah and his replacement by his son, Mohammad Reza Pahlavi (though the party never rose to power). After failing to reach power, this form of third world socialism was replaced by Mosaddegh's populist, non-aligned Iranian nationalism of the National Front party as the main anti-monarchy force in Iran, reaching power (1949–1953), and it remained with that strength even in opposition (after the overthrow of Mossadegh) until the rise of Islamism and the Iranian Revolution. The Tudehs have moved towards basic socialist communism since then.

Kemalism can very arguably be added to the list, as it appeared before the notion of Third World was created in post-World War II, it added populism to the equation (something not all Third World socialists did; Nasser and Nkrumah, for example, did) and Turkey is more developed than the typical notion of a Third World country, but as it was used as a model of government after the Turkish War of Independence to rebuild Turkey and recover it from the underdevelopment of the Ottoman Empire, creating a strong nation in face of the prospect of European colonialism, it can be considered as reaching the templates of a Third World socialism movement. From the 1960s onwards, Third World socialist and Third Worldist thought influenced left-Kemalism.

The Kemalist experiment, Fabian socialism and social democracy in general and the main Third World communist country, the People's Republic of China, were big influences on the movement. Despite being inspired by social democracy, most of these states were affected at one time or another by strongmen or big man leaders or one-party systems. In any case, most Third World socialist states are followers of social democratic reformism (normally state-guided), preferring it to revolution, although some adopted a kind of permanent revolution stance on the social progress to a socialist society.

== Latin American socialism ==
Many Latin American thinkers argued that the United States used Latin American countries as "peripheral economies" at the expense of Latin American social and economic development, which many saw as an extension of neo-colonialism and neo-imperialism. This shift in thinking led to a surge of dialogue related to how Latin America could assert its social and economic independence from the United States. Many scholars argued that a shift to socialism could help liberate Latin America from this conflict.

The New Left emerged in Latin America, a group which sought to go beyond existing Marxist–Leninist efforts at achieving economic equality and democracy to include social reform and address issues unique to Latin America such as racial and ethnic equality, indigenous rights and environmental issues. Notable New Left movements in Latin America include the Cuban Revolution of 1959, the victory of the Sandinista revolution in Nicaragua of 1979, the Workers' Party government in Porto Alegre of 1990, among others.

Because of its close proximity and strong historical connection to the United States, Cuba served an integral role in spreading socialism to the rest of Latin America. Che Guevara described Cuba as "a guiding light" to Latin American countries caught in conflict between imperialism and socialism. In Guevara's speech "On Revolutionary Medicine", he recounts his travels through Latin America and the misery, hunger and disease he witnessed and explained how a shift to socialism could help alleviate these struggles. As part of the New Left, Fidel Castro and Che Guevara implemented leftist politics in Cuba while incorporating policies aimed at addressing social issues. Cuban officials intended for Cuba to spur similar leftist revolutions in the rest of Latin America, what he saw as a common "liberation struggle", in countries like Venezuela, Bolivia and Nicaragua.

In the case of Juan Perón, elected president of Argentina on three times, his Third World socialist stance was fused with radical populism, which aligned itself with the Third World and the Non-Aligned Movement (what Perón called "the third position"), with a significant state intervention for development such as five-year plans, the nationalization of railways, ports and banks, the creation of an agency to regulate grain exports (the IAPI) and the establishment of a modern welfare state. Despite his progressive policies, Perón did not define himself or his doctrine as "socialist" during his first presidencies (1946–1955), but he did later during his exile and during his third presidency (1973–1974) when he coined the term "Christian national socialism" (socialismo nacional cristiano), sort of an Argentine way to socialism. Perón defined it as "a ‘national’ road to socialism, understood as a system of economic socialization and popular power respectful of specific national conditions and traditions." Amongst his influences, Perón listed the "Nordic model", corporatism and non-aligned, Third World socialist models such as Christian socialism and Nasserism. Scholars described Perón's ideology as a variant of non-Marxist Christian socialism, Third World socialism, or a fusion of "indigenous socialism with Argentine nationalism".

== See also ==
- Maoism (Third Worldism)
- Non-Aligned Movement
- Third-Worldism
- Three Worlds Theory
