= John Bracey Jr. =

American historian (1941–2023)

- Born: July 17, 1941; Chicago, Illinois, U.S.
- Died: February 5, 2023 (aged 81)
- Education: Howard University; Roosevelt University; Northwestern University
- Occupations: Historian and activist

John Bracey, Jr. (July 17, 1941 – February 5, 2023) was an African-American scholar, historian, and activist who significantly contributed to the study of African-American history and culture.

== Early life ==
John Bracey, Jr. was born in Chicago, Illinois, in 1941. He was raised in Washington D.C in the 1950s, during the period of the Jim Crow laws. Bracey's mother, Helen, taught at Howard University's School of Education. During his childhood, Bracey participated in Negro History Week celebrations.

== Education ==
While in Washington, D.C., Bracey began his studies at Howard University. He moved back to Chicago and studied at Roosevelt University, where he earned his bachelor's degree in 1964. He continued with graduate studies at Roosevelt University and Northwestern University.

== Civil rights work ==
While Bracey was a student in the 1960s, he was involved in civil rights activities such as sit-ins and marches to protest racial segregation. During 1961–1971 in Chicago, he was heavily involved with civil rights movements, Black Liberation, and Peace movements.

The best-known rally in which Bracey participated was the Grant Park Protest in 1963, involving 10,000 demonstrators alongside Rev. Joseph H. Jackson, a civil rights activist. The protest took place because Chicago Mayor Richard Daley was attempting to minimize the issue of race relations.

During his activism work, Bracey gained infamy from Chicago police. The police would follow and attempt to arrest him daily. However, the African-American members of the Police Department protected Bracey during these times. The African-American officers would escort Bracey to where he was going safely, and they would also tell Bracey about the upcoming plans of the Department.

== African-American studies ==
In 1972, Bracey became a professor at the University of Massachusetts (UMass). He was one of the leading professors in the fields of African American studies and U.S. History. Bracey helped create one of the nation's first doctoral programs in African American Studies. During his time at the University of Massachusetts, he was a faculty member in the W.E.B. Du Bois Department of Afro-American Studies, and he also directed and chaired the African Diaspora Studies graduate certificate.

Books that Bracey wrote and edited books include Black Nationalism in America, African American Women and the Vote: 1837-1965; African American Mosaic: A Documentary History from the Slave Trade to the Twenty-First Century (co-authored with Manisha Sinha); and SOS—Calling All Black People: a Black Arts Movement Reader (co-edited with James Smethurst and Sonia Sanchez. Bracey also wrote the introductions to Muhammad Ahmad's We Will Return in the Whirlwind: Black Radical Organizations 1960–1975 and the 2006 edition of Facing Reality by C. L. R. James and Grace C. Lee.

Bracey supported student organizations, initiatives, and contributed greatly to cultural and educational life at UMass. His wide interests included music, particularly jazz. In addition to his scholarly works, he penned an award-winning essay on John Coltrane. At the University, Bracey sponsored tributes to Yusef Lateef and Max Roach, as well as other luminaries.

Chair of the W.E.B. Du Bois Department Yolanda Covington-Ward has said:

"Professor Bracey was a giant in his field. His contributions, mentorship, and advocacy for African American Studies/Black Studies were known throughout the world. He was a member of our department faculty for over 50 years...an institution within himself. Our department has lost one of its strongest pillars."

== Death ==
John Bracey, Jr. died on February 5, 2023, at the age of 81, survived by his wife, Ingrid Bracey, the former director of University Without Walls (University of Massachusetts Amherst).

== Works ==
=== Books ===
- African American Mosaic: A Documentary History from the Slave Trade to the Twenty-First Century (two volumes)
- SOS - Calling All Black People: a Black Arts Movement Reader
- Blacks in the Abolitionist movement
- The World of W.E.B. Du Bois
- The Rise of the Ghetto
- Truth and Revolution
- Strangers the Neighbors
- African American Women and the Vote, 1837–1965
- A White Scholar and the Black Community 1945–1965
