= Xiaozi =

Chinese subculture

Xiaozi (Chinese: 小资; pinyin: xiǎozī), is a Chinese cultural term describing a lifestyle chasing modern taste, living standards, and arts. Originally the term was a Chinese translation of "petite bourgeoisie". After the reform and opening up, some urban Chinese who had been immersed in Marxist ideas of class conflict found they were not as poor as the proletariat but not as rich as the bourgeoisie. They regarded themselves as petite bourgeoisie to distinguish themselves from ordinary city dwellers.
