= Settlers: The Mythology of the White Proletariat =

1983 book by J. Sakai

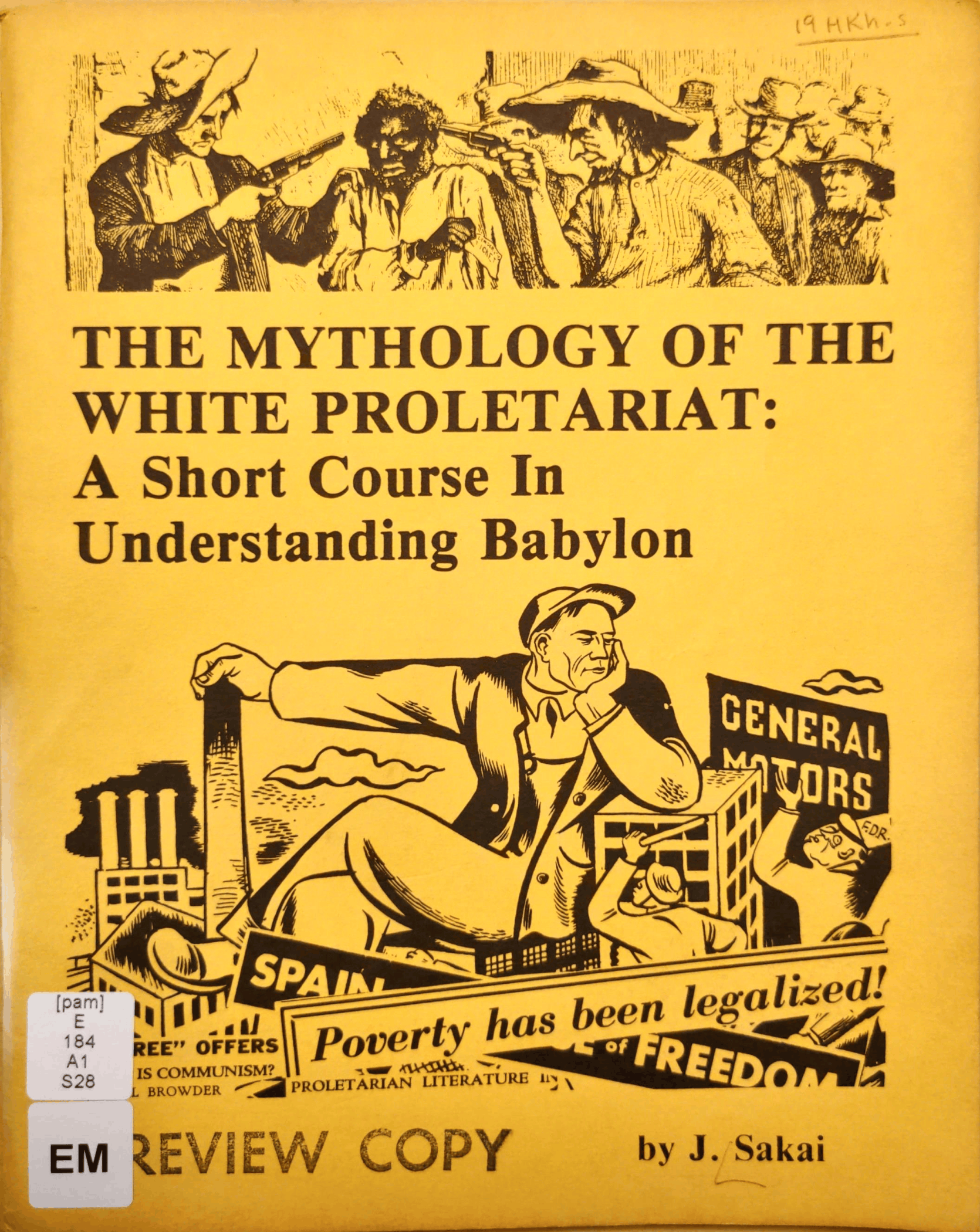
- First edition cover
- Author: J. Sakai
- Original title: The Mythology of the White Proletariat: A Short Course in Understanding Babylon
- Language: English
- Subject: Colonialism, racism, white supremacy
- Published: Morningstar Press (1983, 1989); PM Press and Kersplebedeb (2014)
- Publication place: United States
- Pages: 172 (1st–3rd editions); 456 (4th edition)
- ISBN: 978-1-62963-037-3
- OCLC: 793020678
- Dewey Decimal: 320
- LC Class: E184 .A1 .S253
- Text: Settlers: The Mythology of the White Proletariat at Internet Archive
- Website: readsettlers.org

Settlers: The Mythology of the White Proletariat (Note: Republished in 2014 as Settlers: The Mythology of the White Proletariat From Mayflower to Modern and originally published as The Mythology of the White Proletariat: A Short Course in Understanding Babylon) is a 1983 book by J. Sakai that aims to provide a historical account of the formation of whiteness in the United States. Written from a Marxist perspective, the book argues that the white working class in the United States constitutes a privileged labor aristocracy. The book had some influence among prisoners associated with the Black Liberation Army.

== Background ==
J. Sakai, the book's pseudonymous author, is a Japanese-American Maoist and revolutionary socialist. He was born to Japanese immigrants and worked in the US auto industry. Sakai was radicalized through the internment of Japanese Americans, radical factions of the American labor movement, and his involvement with the black freedom struggle as it evolved from the civil rights movement to the black liberation movement. Sakai and Settlers are tied to the history of Chicago-based black nationalism in the late 20th century, serving as a key influence within political discourse among imprisoned Black Liberation Army (BLA) members.

== Publication ==
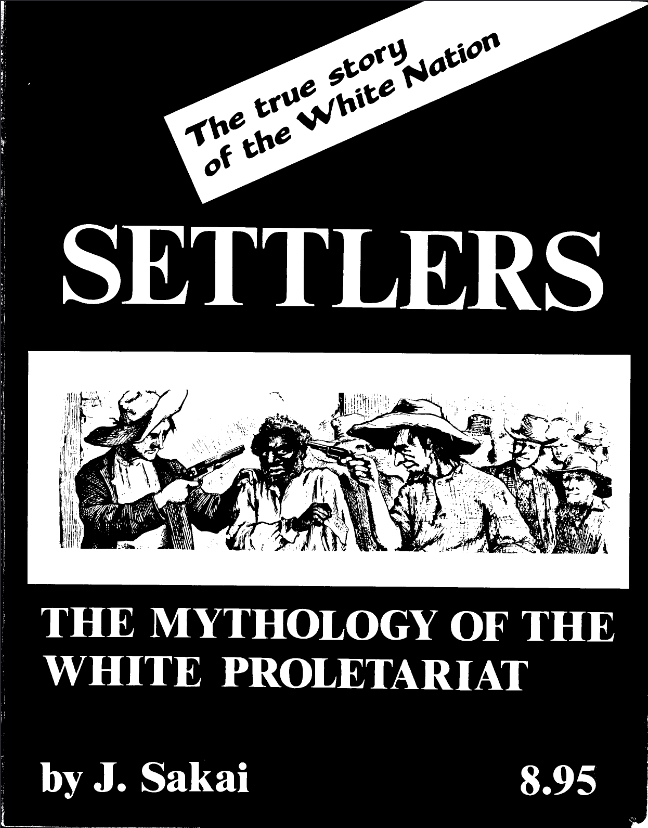
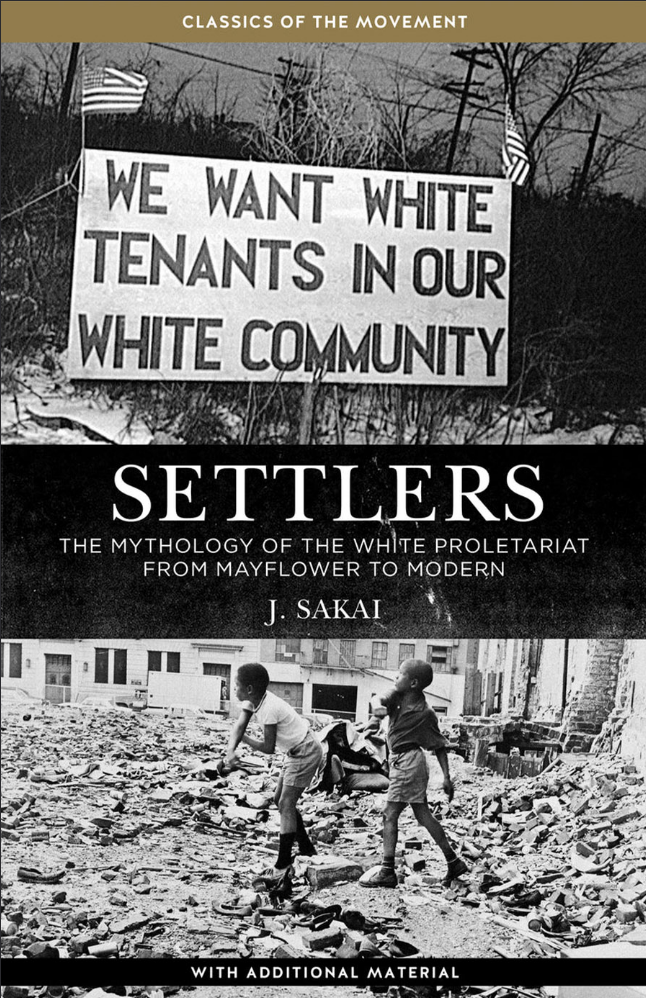
A third edition of Settlers was published in 1989 by Morningstar Press (left) and a fourth edition was published in 2014 by PM Press and Kersplebedeb (right).

Settlers was first published as a letter-sized pamphlet in 1983 under the title The Mythology of the White Proletariat: A Short Course in Understanding Babylon. Settlers was distributed within covert networks organized by activists associated with the BLA. A fourth edition was published jointly by PM Press and Kersplebedeb in 2014 under the title Settlers: The Mythology of the White Proletariat from Mayflower to Modern. The 2014 edition eschews the oversized format and includes two new additions: an interview with Sakai and an essay on reparations for the internment of Japanese Americans during World War II.

== Summary ==
Settlers argues that the class system in the United States is built upon the genocide of Native Americans and the enslavement of Africans and that the white working class in the United States constitutes a privileged labor aristocracy that lacks proletarian consciousness. Arguing that the white working class possesses a petit-bourgeois and reformist consciousness, Sakai posits that only the colonized peoples of the United States constitute its proletariat.

== Style ==
Marxist–Leninist–Maoist academic Joshua Moufawad-Paul guessed that the book's lack of success in academia is due to its breaking the "implicit rules of intellectual chivalry". Historian Dan Berger noted that the book was more pessimistic than other works on race written during the same time period.

== Impact and reception ==
Settlers went largely unnoticed within academia, though it has been somewhat influential among radicals. Jacobin editor Owen Hatherley stated in 2024 that there was an "online cult" around the book. Historian David Roediger cited Settlers in his book The Wages of Whiteness making it among the few scholarly publications to reference the work. Roediger stated that while he preferred Ted Allen's works on white identity, criticizing what he felt was the book's "at times 'categorical and transhistorical' dismissal of those defined as white", he had hoped other labor historians would take notice of the book's arguments. Berger described Settlers as a "paradigm-setting" book that developed conceptions about settler colonialism that would later become axiomatic within the field of critical ethnic studies.

Some critics praised the book's account of the historical construction of whiteness and class in the United States. Kevin Bruyneel, writing in the book Settler Memory, described Settlers as among the first and most comprehensive works aiming to define American whiteness by "its historical foundations in settler life". Writing in Labour/Le Travail, Fred Burrill acknowledged criticisms of the book over its usage of contingent categories, but otherwise praised the book's "clear articulation" of the development of classes in the United States.

Fredy Perlman, in a footnote to the essay "The Continuing Appeal of Nationalism", described the work as a "sensitive" application of Mao Zedong Thought to American history; however, Perlman objected to its political prescriptions and argued that Settlers blatantly aimed to reproduce the same repressive systems described earlier in the work. In return, former Black Panther Kuwasi Balagoon wrote a response to Perlman's essay from prison calling him a "cheap-shot artist who offered an underhanded review" and praising Settlers as a historically faithful work, in spite of its Marxism. While largely agreeing with Sakai's analysis, Balagoon opined that grassroots collectives would better serve the oppressed than mass institutions "under the leadership of a communist party".

Weather Underground militant David Gilbert praised the book's historical content as "revealing and useful", though he expressed disagreement at the book's conclusions, arguing that Sakai had downplayed historical examples that evidenced the possibility for class struggle among white working-class Americans. Both Gilbert and Berger lamented the book's lack of attention to gender, with Gilbert noting that the women's movement could form a progressive current within the white working class. Writing in the Monthly Review, economist Michael Yates critiqued Gilbert's review of the book as "too generous", calling Sakai's account of white Americans "preposterous on its face" and "an insult to those whites who have suffered the grossest exploitation and still do".

== Notes and citations ==
Notes

Citations
