= Maoism–Third Worldism =

Communist political ideology

Maoism–Third Worldism (MTW) is a broad tendency which is mainly concerned with the infusion and synthesis of Marxism—particularly of the Marxist–Leninist–Maoist persuasion—with concepts of non-Marxist Third Worldism, namely dependency theory and world-systems theory. Contrary to its name, Maoism–Third Worldism is a movement which was historically developed and primarily believed within the United States.

There is no general consensus on part of Maoist–Third Worldists as a whole. However, the majority of proponents typically argue for the centrality of anti-imperialism to the victory of global communist revolution as well as against the idea that the working class in the First World is majority-exploiting (sometimes arguing that it experiences no exploitation at all) and therefore it is not a part of the international proletariat, but rather labor aristocracy.

== Theory ==
Maoism–Third Worldism is defined by a variety of political principles which emphasize the enormous economic, social and political divisions which exist currently between the "overdeveloped" First World and "underdeveloped" Third World. This is expressed through the lens of Maoist theory and practice - brought into a new, international understanding of imperialism and class - in the context of the world divided into two distinct camps; the exploited countries (the Third World) and their exploiters (the First World).

=== Global people's war ===
The foundations of Maoism–Third Worldism extend to encapsulate a great many strategic and theoretical developments in Marxist theory over the 20th century. Among them is the understanding of a global people's war being necessary as a military strategy for bringing an end to the historically unequal relationship built between the First and Third Worlds. This strategy includes the systematic delinking of the exploited economies of Third World countries from the parasitic First World and the unification of international forces to deprive the imperialist countries of resources and wealth extracted from Third World countries.

Though this strategy draws inspiration from several historical sources - such as Che Guevara's Message to the Tri-Continental - it is, most famously, derived from a quote from Lin Biao's speech Long Live the Victory of People's War! in 1965:

Taking the entire globe, if North America and Western Europe can be called 'the cities of the world', then Asia, Africa and Latin America constitute 'the rural areas of the world'. Since World War II, the proletarian revolutionary movement has for various reasons been temporarily held back in the North American and West European capitalist countries, while the people’s revolutionary movement in Asia, Africa and Latin America has been growing vigorously. In a sense, the contemporary world revolution also presents a picture of the encirclement of cities by the rural areas. In the final analysis, the whole cause of world revolution hinges on the revolutionary struggles of the Asian, African and Latin American peoples who make up the overwhelming majority of the world’s population. The socialist countries should regard it as their internationalist duty to support the people’s revolutionary struggles in Asia, Africa and Latin America.

=== Joint-dictatorship of the proletariat of oppressed nations ===
Also fundamental to Maoism–Third Worldism is an understanding of the joint-dictatorship of the proletariat of oppressed nations (JDPON) and/or global new democratic revolution (GNDR) which is proposed as a form of alter-globalization aimed at breaking the political and economic foundations of the economic parasitism between the First and Third Worlds. The JDPON is a point of relative contention between the various proponents of Maoism–Third Worldism or at least the tendencies which have now been named as falling generally under the Third Worldist tendency within Marxism. It is upheld by a variety of Leftist parties, including the Revolutionary Anti-Imperialist Movement and Maoist Internationalist Movement (Prisons).

Before Maoism, a similar theory was proposed by Mirsaid Sultan-Galiev, who argued for a Colonial International, that would exist independent of, or if necessary, in opposition to the Third International. Galiev stated that a Colonial International would consist of all oppressed nations in Africa, Asia and both South and North America, arguing that the native populations as well as the African populations of the Americas were colonised nations. Galiev argued that this International could possibly need to form a dictatorship over the metropolitan states of America and Europe.

== See also ==
- Black radical tradition
- Non-Aligned Movement
- Third World socialism
- Three Worlds Theory
- Settlers: The Mythology of the White Proletariat
