= Labor aristocracy =

Term in Marxism and political theory of unions

In Marxist theory, the labor aristocracy is the segment of the working class which has better wages and working conditions compared to the broader proletariat, often enabled by their specialized skills, by membership in trade unions or guilds, and in a global context by the exploitation of colonized or underdeveloped countries. Due to their better-off condition, such workers are more likely to align with the bourgeoisie to maintain capitalism instead of advocating for broader working-class solidarity and socialist revolution.

The concept was introduced independently by revolutionary socialists Mikhail Bakunin (in the 1870s) and Friedrich Engels (in 1858), the latter describing the emergence of trade unions consisting of such workers in Great Britain in the late 19th century. Engels' theory was further developed by Vladimir Lenin, who tied the concept to imperialism. Revolutionary industrial unions, such as the Industrial Workers of the World, used the term to describe trade-based business unionism, which they considered exclusionary.

== Origins ==
The theory that well-compensated and well-to-do proletarians are more manipulable into collaborating with the bourgeoisie was formulated by Friedrich Engels in a letter dated 7 October 1858 to Karl Marx.

A precursor to both wordings – "aristocracy of labor" and "labor aristocracy" – appears in Marx's 1867 treatise Das Kapital, Volume I.

The precise wordings "aristocracy of labour" and "labour aristocracy" are attested in works produced from the late 19th to early 20th century such as William Morris's 1885 The Manifesto of The Socialist League (in English), Frank Kitz's 1886 article Internationalism (in English), Paul Delasalle's 1900 pamphlet L'action syndicale et les anarchistes (in French), Karl Kautsky's 1892 book Das Erfurter Programm in seinem grundsätzlichen Theil erläutert (in German) and 1901 article Trades Unions and Socialism (translated into English by Eugene Dietzgen), etc.

Mikhail Bakunin, who also proposed in a fragment written in French around 1872 that relatively better-off proletarians were heavily bourgeois-influenced, is credited with coining the term "aristocracy of labo[u]r" (whence "labo[u]r aristocracy"); however, that term is in fact found in Sam Dolgoff's 1971 loose translation of Bakunin's fragment, which contains no word translatable literally as "aristocracy of labo(u)r". In an unsent letter dated to 5 October 1872 for La Liberté, Bakunin likewise objected to a "so-called popular state" of, by, and for "a new aristocracy" of urban factory workers who would subjugate the rural proletariat.

== Use within Marxism ==
In Marxist theory, those workers (proletarians) in the developed countries who benefit from the superprofits extracted from the impoverished workers of developing countries form an "aristocracy of labor". According to Lenin, companies in the developed world exploit workers in the developing world where wages are much lower. The increased profits enable these companies to pay higher wages to their employees "at home" (that is, in the developed world), thus creating a working class satisfied with their standard of living and not inclined to proletarian revolution. It is a form of exporting poverty, creating an "exclave" of lower social class. Lenin contended that imperialism had prevented increasing class polarization in the developed world.

The concept of a labor aristocracy is controversial between Marxists. While the theory is formally shared by most currents that identify positively with Lenin, including the Communist International, few organizations place the theory at the center of their work. The term is most widely used in the United States, where it was popularized in the decade prior to World War I by Eugene V. Debs's Socialist Party of America and the Industrial Workers of the World. In Britain, those who hold to this theory include the Communist Party of Great Britain (Marxist–Leninist) and the Revolutionary Communist Group. Many Trotskyists, including Leon Trotsky himself and the early congresses of the Fourth International, have accepted the theory of the labor aristocracy whereas others, including Ernest Mandel and Tony Cliff, considered the theory to have mistaken arguments or "Third Worldist" implications.

Albanian leader and Marxist Enver Hoxha gave the following explanation for the development of the labor aristocracy following World War II:

The development of the economy in the West after the war also exerted a great influence on the spread of opportunist and revisionist ideas in the communist parties. True, Western Europe was devastated by the war but its recovery was carried out relatively quickly. The American capital which poured into Europe through the 'Marshall Plan' made it possible to reconstruct the factories, plants, transport and agriculture so that their production extended rapidly. This development opened up many jobs and for a long period, not only absorbed all the free labour force but even created a certain shortage of labour.

This situation, which brought the bourgeoisie great superprofits, allowed it to loosen its purse-strings a little and soften the labour conflicts to some degree. In the social field, in such matters as social insurance, health, education, labour legislation etc., it took some measures for which the working class had fought hard. The obvious improvement of the standard of living of the working people in comparison with that of the time of the war and even before the war, the rapid growth of production, which came as a result of the reconstruction of industry and agriculture and the beginning of the technical and scientific revolution, and the full employment of the work force, opened the way to the flowering among the unformed opportunist element of views about the development of capitalism without class conflicts, about its ability to avoid crises, the elimination of the phenomenon of unemployment etc. That major teaching of Marxism-Leninism, that the periods of peaceful development of capitalism becomes a source for the spread of opportunism, was confirmed once again. The new stratum of the worker aristocracy, which increased considerably during this period, began to exert an ever more negative influence in the ranks of the parties and their leaderships by introducing reformist and opportunist views and ideas.

Under pressure of these circumstances, the programs of these communist parties were reduced more and more to democratic and reformist minimum programs, while the idea of the revolution and socialism became ever more remote. The major strategy of the revolutionary transformation of society gave way to the minor strategy about current problems of the day which was absolutized and became the general political and ideological line.

— Enver Hoxha

== Criticism of business unions of workers ==
In the United States and Britain, the term "aristocracy of labor" is used as an implicit criticism of labor unions that have organized high-salary workers and have no interest in unionizing middle-income and lower-income employees—even in cases where organizing the unorganized would strengthen the unions involved. These unions, it is argued, are content to remain a "labor aristocracy". Examples might include the unions of professional athletes, which have raised the wages of a certain class of already highly paid workers—professional athletes—but refuse to organize other workers, including other employees of the teams they work for. It commonly charged that the Air Line Pilots Association, the Screen Actors Guild and a handful of other AFL–CIO unions conform to the labor aristocracy model of trade unionism.

At the beginning of the 20th century in the United States, "most American Federation of Labor (AFL) unions did not admit unskilled mass-production workers". Selig Perlman wrote in 1923 that skilled workers organized into craft unions were more interested in trade separatism than in labor solidarity. The craft workers were capable of demanding more from their employers due to their skills and preferred to fight separately from unskilled or semiskilled workers. In Perlman's words, the trade unions declared that their purpose was "to protect the skilled trades of America from being reduced to beggary".

In 1905, many existing unions actively lobbied for racist and anti-immigration policies through the creation of the notorious Asiatic Exclusion League. That same year, a new union called the Industrial Workers of the World (IWW) was formed in Chicago. The IWW, also known as the Wobblies, differed from the AFL in significant ways:

- The IWW organized without regard to sex, skills, race, creed, or national origin, from the very start.
- The AFL was craft based while the IWW inherited the tradition of industrial unionism pioneered by the Knights of Labor, the American Railway Union and the Western Federation of Miners (WFM).
- The IWW promoted the concept of all workers in one big union. Ever cognizant of the common practice of AFL craft unions crossing each other's picket lines, the IWW adopted the WFM's description of the AFL as the "American Separation of Labor".
- The IWW believed that unions needed to build a labor movement with a structure that closely mapped the industries they sought to organize. A great merger movement had swept through corporations in the period from 1899 to 1903 and labor radicals believed that "the unifaction of capital represented by the rise of the new trusts needed to be countered by an equally unified organization of the entire working class".

From its inception in 1905, the IWW criticized existing craft unions for creating a "labor aristocracy". Eugene V. Debs wrote that "seasoned old unionists" could see that working people could not win with the labor movement they had. Debs believed the AFL practiced "organized scabbery" of one union on another, engaged in jurisdictional squabbling, was dominated by an autocratic leadership and the relationship between union leaders and millionaires in the National Civic Federation was much too cozy. IWW leaders believed that in the AFL there was too little solidarity and too little "straight" labor education. These circumstances led to too little appreciation of what could be won, and too little will to win it.

Animated by a class philosophy that saw capitalism as an economic system dividing society into two classes—those who own, manage, or rule; and those who have only their labor to sell—the IWW declared:

[...] the working class and the employing class have nothing in common. [...] Between these two classes a struggle must go on until all the toilers [...] take and hold that which they produce by their labor through an economic organization of the working class.

In contrast, the AFL declared:

We have no ultimate ends. We are going only from day to day. We are fighting only for immediate objects—objects that can be realized in a few years [...] we say in our constitution that we are opposed to theorists [...] we are all practical men.

Labor historian Melvyn Dubofsky has written the following:

By 1896 Gompers and the AFL were moving to make their peace with Capitalism and the American system. Although the AFL had once preached the inevitability of class conflict and the need to abolish 'wage slavery', it slowly and almost imperceptibly began to proclaim the virtues of class harmony and the possibilities of a more benevolent Capitalism.

The AFL therefore preached "pure and simple" trade unionism. The AFL concerned itself with a "philosophy of pure wage consciousness", according to Selig Perlman, who developed the "business unionism" theory of labor. Perlman saw craft organizing as a means of resisting the encroachment of waves of immigrants. Organization that was based upon craft skills granted control over access to the job.

While craft unions provided a good defense for the privileges of membership, conventions such as time-limited contracts and pledges not to strike in solidarity with other workers severely limited the ability of craft unions to effect change in society at large, leaving only the ineffectual means granted by a business-dominated elite society, i.e. electoral politics, lobbying congress and a newly enfeebled economic weapon, the injunction-circumscribed strike. However, the AFL embraced this "businesslike" and "pragmatic" worldview, adopting the motto "A fair day's wage for a fair day's work".

The AFL outlived the class consciousness of its own founding Preamble, but the IWW embraced the goal of abolishing wage slavery. In 1908, the IWW responded to what it considered the AFL's class collaborationist tendencies with new wording in the IWW Preamble:

Instead of the conservative motto, "A fair day's wage for a fair day's work," we must inscribe upon our banner the revolutionary watchword, "Abolition of the wage system." [...] The army of production must be organized, not only for the every-day struggle with capitalists, but also to carry on production when capitalism shall have been overthrown.

The IWW saw itself as the answer to the conservatism of the AFL. The IWW developed a variety of creative tactics in its effort to "build a new world within the shell of the old". Because the AFL declined to act as an ally in such a cause, the Wobblies sought to develop solidarity with all rank and file workers while criticizing or spoofing AFL union leadership. AFL union "bosses" were (and still are) referred to by the Wobblies as "piecards". To the IWW, all the union bureaucracy of the AFL functioned pretty much as a "labor aristocracy". In that regard, the IWW's views have not changed much over the years.

Mainstream unions have evolved, embracing some of the principles of industrial unionism and (in many cases) opening their doors to a greater spectrum of the working class. However, there are many aspects to business unionism that solidarity unionists still find suspect– a tendency to operate as a business, rather than according to "union principles"; enthroning elite hierarchies of leadership which are not easily recalled by the membership; deriving significant income from the sale of insurance or credit cards, arguably leading to conflicts of interest; union leadership compensation levels that are closer to those of corporate executives than of rank and file workers; top-down decision making; and building relationships with the leadership of corporations or political parties that the rank and file may view with suspicion.

All union movements function in some fashion to raise up workers in social or economic status or in union privilege. The significant difference between a union movement with a labor aristocracy and a union movement based upon class solidarity is how and to what extent the structure, bureaucracy and in particular policies and practices of that union movement function, either to leave that level of increased privilege as the status quo, or to recognize the necessity of building structural relationships, promoting education and engaging in solidarity activities with the specific intention of translating gains into an effort to enhance the status of all working people.

== See also ==
- Company union
- Welfare chauvinism
- Leninism
- Third-Worldism
