= Max Stanford =

American civil rights activist (born 1941)

Maxwell Stanford Muhammad Ahmad
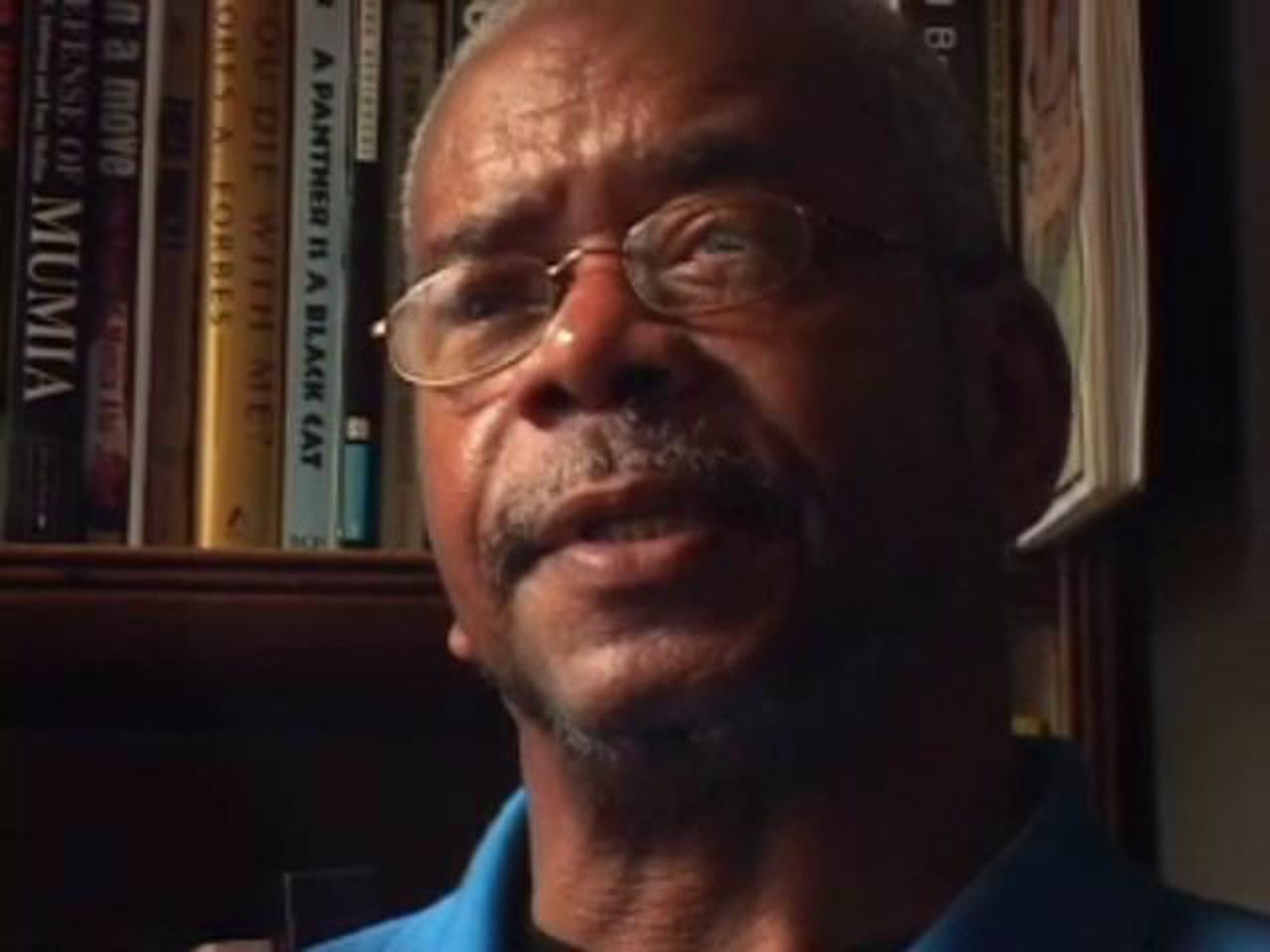
- Born: Maxwell Curtis Stanford, Jr; 31 July 1941 (age 85); Philadelphia, Pennsylvania, U.S.
- Other names: Max Stanford; Maxwell C. Stanford; Maxwell Stanford, Jr.
- Organization: Revolutionary Action Movement (1962–68)

Muhammad Ahmad (born Maxwell Curtis Stanford Jr. on 31 July 1941), also known as Max Stanford, (Note: Also known as Maxwell Stanford; Maxwell Stanford, Jr; Maxwell C. Stanford and Maxwell C. Stanford, Jr.) is an American civil rights activist. He was a cofounder and the national chairman of the Revolutionary Action Movement (RAM), a Marxist–Leninist, black power organisation active from 1962 to 1968. He is the author of We Will Return in the Whirlwind: Black Radical Organizations 1960-1975 (Chicago: Charles H. Kerr Publishing Company, 2007), with an introduction by John Bracey Jr. As of 2024, he is working with Dylan Davis, PhD candidate in politics at the University of California Santa Cruz, on an updated edition.

== Political activism ==
=== Early life ===
Max Stanford was born on 31 July 1941 in Philadelphia, Pennsylvania, United States. He described his family as "very political" and attributes the development of his political consciousness to his father. He graduated from West Philadelphia High School and attended Central State College in Wilberforce, Ohio from 1960 to 1962.

=== Founding the Revolutionary Action Movement (RAM) ===
In 1961, an off-campus chapter of the Students for a Democratic Society (SDS), called Challenge, was formed by students from Central State College. According to Stanford, Challenge possessed no basic ideology. By 1962, the group came into contact with Donald Freeman, a school teacher from Cleveland, Ohio. With the guidance of Freeman, Challenge eventually transformed into RAM, a group which was based on Marxist–Leninist and black nationalist ideas. Stanford was also inspired by Maoism, which he had become aware of through his admiration of Robert F. Williams. The group initially called themselves the Reform Action Movement (RAM) because they felt the term "revolutionary" would cause panic among the college's administration.

After RAM managed to take over the student government of Central State College, some members wanted to continue their activism on campus, while other members, including Stanford, wanted to return to their respective communities and become full-time activists. Stanford and another RAM member, Wanda Marshall, met with Malcolm X in New York and asked if they should join the Nation of Islam. Malcolm replied: "You can do more for the Honorable Elijah Muhammad by organizing outside of the Nation."

=== COINTELPRO ===
Starting from 1956, the Federal Bureau of Investigation (FBI) began the covert COINTELPRO campaign to infiltrate, discredit and disrupt organisations which were considered subversive. RAM was one of the groups targeted by the program and Stanford was even referred to as "the most dangerous man in America", by J. Edgar Hoover. In 1966, Stanford was arrested in New York, along with 15 other RAM members, accused of conspiring to assassinate NAACP leader Roy Wilkins and the Urban League's Whitney Young. Stanford was acquitted of the charges and he returned to Philadelphia to establish the Black Guard, a youth and self-defense wing of RAM.

In 1967, RAM remained under the surveillance of Philadelphia police and the FBI. Stanford was arrested by police on July 26, 1967, and accused of planning with RAM to start a riot. Over the next month, 35 other RAM members were also arrested. Subsequently, Stanford dissolved RAM in 1968, and its members joined other organisations.

== Personal life ==
Stanford converted to Islam in 1970 and adopted the name Muhammad Ahmad. In 2011, he stated in an interview with The Temple News: "I'm just a servant of the people and a servant of Allah. I don't separate the two. I just think that the pursuit of happiness, equality, freedom and justice is the overwhelming will of the majority of people on planet Earth."

He earned a Bachelor of Arts degree from the University of Massachusetts and a Master of Arts from Atlanta University in 1986. He completed his Ph.D. in Union Institute and University in 1992.

On 5 January 2021, a GoFundMe campaign was launched for donations towards paying for medical bills, a stair lift for his home, a book to be authored with the assistance of John Bracey Jr., and "securing and transforming his 6,000-plus volume book collection—which specializes in rare and classical books on Black history, socialism and world civilization—into a publicly accessible library." It stated that Stanford "has been hospitalized numerous times over the last several years after suffering a stroke and experiencing kidney malfunctions which have repeatedly resulted in severe water retention known as edema. In addition, Doc suffers from gout, arthritis and high blood pressure."

== Written works ==
- Basic Tenets of Revolutionary Black Nationalism (1977)
- History of RAM – Revolutionary Action Movement (1979)
- A Case Study of an Urban Revolutionary Movement in Western Capitalist Society (1986)
