= Petite bourgeoisie =

Social class

Petite bourgeoisie (French pronunciation: [pətit(ə) buʁʒwazi], lit. 'small bourgeoisie'; also anglicised as petty bourgeoisie) in Marxist theory is a social class composed of small business owners, shopkeepers, small-scale merchants, semi-autonomous peasants, and artisans. They are named as such because their politico-economic ideological stance in times of stability is reflective of the proper haute bourgeoisie (high bourgeoisie or upper class). In ordinary times, the petite bourgeoisie seek to identify themselves with the haute bourgeoisie, whose bourgeois morality, conduct and lifestyle they aspire to and strive to imitate.

The term, which goes as far back as the revolutionary period in France, is politico-economic and addresses historical materialism. It originally denoted a sub-stratum of the middle classes in the 18th and early-19th centuries of Western Europe. In the mid-19th century, the German economist Karl Marx and other Marxist theorists used the term petite bourgeoisie to academically identify the socio-economic stratum of the bourgeoisie.

== Definition ==
The petite bourgeoisie is economically distinct from the proletariat, or working class, which relies entirely on the sale of their labour-power for survival. It is also distinct from the capitalist class haute bourgeoisie ('high' bourgeoisie), defined by owning the means of production and thus deriving most of their wealth from buying the labour-power of the proletariat and to work the means of production.

Although members of the petite bourgeoisie can buy the labour of others, they typically work alongside their employees, unlike the haute bourgeoisie. Examples can include shopkeepers, artisans, and small-scale entrepreneurs.

The petite bourgeoisie is little-defined in Marx's own work, with only the words 'smaller capitalists' used in The Communist Manifesto.

== Role in fascism ==
Historically, Karl Marx predicted that the petite bourgeoisie was to lose in the course of economic development.

The [petty bourgeoise] sink[s] gradually into the proletariat, partly because their diminutive capital does not suffice for the scale on which Modern Industry is carried on, and is swamped in the competition with the large capitalists, partly because their specialized skill is rendered worthless by new methods of production.

The livelihood of the petite bourgeoisie is thus threatened. Competition with the big bourgeoise and simultaneous pressures from the proletariat leaves them in a precarious position. Marx acknowledges that the petit bourgeois, still, want to preserve the existing relations of property and cannot be revolutionary like the proletariat. Marxist theorists say that the instability of the petite bourgeoisie, when augmented in times of crisis, leads to its attraction to forms of government such as fascism. Trotsky concluded:

The fascists find their human material mainly in the petty bourgeoisie. The latter has been entirely ruined by big capital. There is no way out for it in the present social order, but it knows of no other. Its dissatisfaction, indignation, and despair are diverted by the fascists away from big capital and against the workers. It may be said that fascism is the act of placing the petty bourgeoisie at the disposal of its most bitter enemies. In this way, big capital ruins the middle classes and then, with the help of hired fascist demagogues, incites the despairing petty bourgeoisie against the worker.

Daniel Guerin concluded:

The middle classes, caught between menacing big business and an aggressive working class, have become enraged and turned toward fascism.

Historian Richard Pipes claimed that although the Nazi Party originally consisted mainly of the petit bourgeois, by the end of the 1920s workers joined the party en masse, becoming the largest occupational group in the party by 1934.

Wilhelm Reich also highlighted the principal support of the rise of fascism in Germany given by the petite bourgeoisie and middle class in The Mass Psychology of Fascism. He claimed that the middle classes were a hotbed for political reaction due to their reliance on the patriarchal family (according to Reich, small businesses are often self-exploiting enterprises of families headed by the father, whose morality binds the family together in their somewhat precarious economic position) and the sexual repression that underlies it.

== Literary treatment of the petite bourgeoisie ==
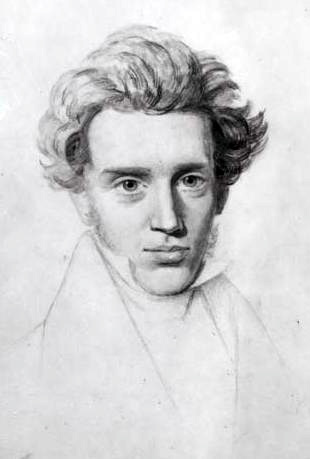
Søren Kierkegaard

Søren Kierkegaard wrote that "the petty bourgeois is spiritless[.] ... Devoid of imagination, as the petty bourgeois always is, he lives within a certain orbit of trivial experiences as to how things come about, what is possible, what usually happens, no matter whether he is a tapster or a prime minister. This is the way the petty bourgeois has lost himself and God".

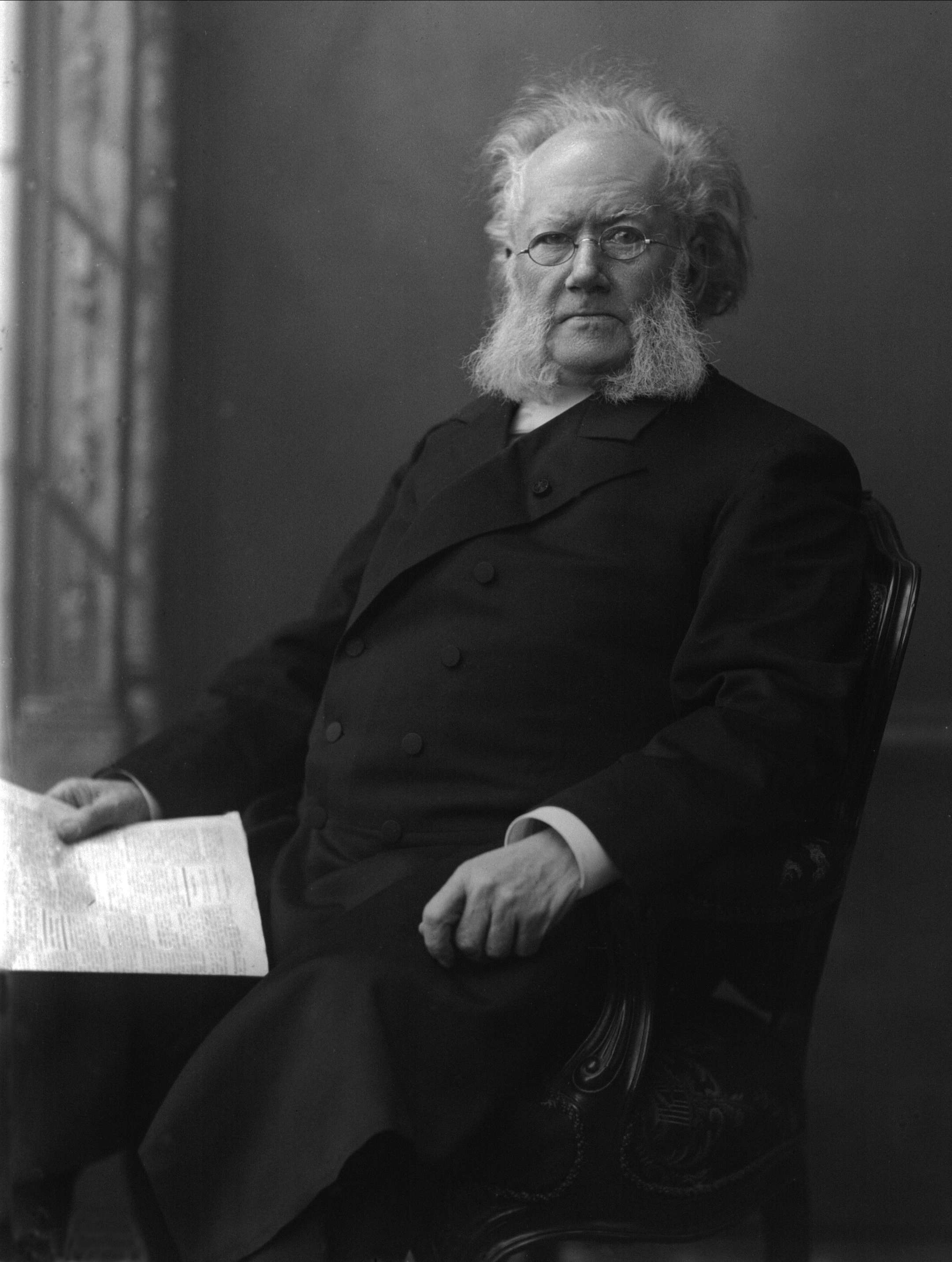
Henrik Ibsen

In fact, though there have been many depictions of the petite bourgeoisie in literature as well as in cartoons, based on an image of their overly conventional practicality, the realities of the petite bourgeoisie throughout the 19th century were more complex. All the same, writers have been concerned with petite bourgeois morality and behavior and have portrayed them as undesirable characters. Henrik Ibsen's An Enemy of the People was a play written in direct response to the reception of another one of his plays for making "indecent" references to syphilis and in general his work was considered scandalous in its disregard for the morality of the period. Later, Bertolt Brecht's concern with Nazism and his Marxist politics got him interested in exploring the petite-bourgeois mind, and this interest led him to represent the petite bourgeoisie repeatedly throughout his work (one was even titled The Seven Deadly Sins of the Petite Bourgeoisie).

In his book Two Cheers for Anarchism: Six Easy Pieces on Autonomy, Dignity, and Meaningful Work and Play, James C. Scott dedicates an entire chapter to describing some features of the petite bourgeoisie. First, he points out the contempt of this class by Marxists due to the ambiguity of their political position. He further points out that this position of contempt or distaste encompasses both the socialist bloc and large capitalist democracies, due to the difficulty of monitoring, taxing and policing of this class. This difficulty results from the complexity, variety and mobility of activities taken on by this class. He points out the petite bourgeoisie has existed for most of civilized history. He also states that even those who are not part of the class have to some degree desired to become small property owners, due to the conferred autonomy and social standing. He continues that the desire to keep and restore lost land has been the leitmotif of most radically egalitarian mass movements. He argues that the petite bourgeoisie have an indispensable economic role in terms of invention and innovation, citing as an example software startups that develop ideas which are then usually bought by larger firms. He also points out that small shopkeepers provide several "unpaid" social services such as:

... informal social work, public safety, the aesthetic pleasures of an animated and interesting streetscape, a large variety of social experiences and personalized services, acquaintance networks, informal neighborhood news and gossip, a building block of social solidarity and public action, and (in the case of the smallholding peasantry) good steward-ship of the land

== See also ==
- Professional–managerial class
- Kulak
- Petty nobility
- Producerism
- Labor aristocracy
- Xiaozi
