= Third-worldism =

Cold War ideology promoting the interests of non-aligned countries

The "three worlds" of the Cold War era, as of the period between 30 April and 24 June 1975. Neutral and non-aligned countries shown in grey.

Third-worldism is a political concept and ideology that emerged during the period of decolonization and Cold War that followed the Second World War. The ideology emphasized national self-determination and advocated for solidarity among the countries and people of Africa, Asia and Latin America. Third-worldism called for opposition to colonialism and imperialism, it also supported economic independece from dominant world powers.

Third-worldism encompassed a range of political approaches: early expressions emphasized cooperation among newly independent states, including the 1955 Bandung Conference and the Non-Aligned Movement in 1961. Later expressions (during the 1960s and 1970s) promoted more militant forms of anti-imperialism and national liberation, inspired by revolutionary socialist movements. These movements increasingly identified the United States as a principal imperialist power. Some movements chose to explicitly align themselves with the Soviet Union or China while other sought to remain independent.

Third-worldism declined in influence during the 1980s and the end of the Cold War. Its political and intellectual legacy continued to influence debates about development, international inequality, and postcolonialism.

== Overview ==
The political thinkers and leaders of third-worldism argued that the north–south divisions and conflicts were of primary political importance compared to the East-West opposition of the Cold War period. In the three-world model, the countries of the First World were the ones allied with the United States. The Second World designation referred to the former industrial socialist states under the influence of the Soviet Union. The Third World, hence, consisted of the countries that remained non-aligned with either NATO or the Communist Bloc. The Third World was normally seen to include many countries with colonial pasts in Africa, Latin America, Oceania and Asia. It was also sometimes taken as synonymous with countries in the Non-Aligned Movement, connected to the world economic division as "periphery" countries in the world system that is dominated by the "core" countries. Third-worldism was connected to new political movements following the decolonization and new forms of regionalism that emerged in the erstwhile colonies of Asia, Africa, and the Middle East as well as in the older established states of Latin America, including pan-Arabism, pan-Africanism, pan-Americanism and pan-Asianism.

The first period of the Third Worldist movement, that of the "first Bandung Era", was led by the Egyptian, Indonesian and Indian heads of state such as Nasser, Sukarno and Nehru. They were followed in the 1960s and 1970s by a second generation of third-worldist governments that emphasized a more radical and revolutionary socialist vision, personified by Che Guevara. At the end of the Cold War in the late 1980s, Third Worldism entered a period of decline.

== Third World Solidarity ==
Third World solidarity is a key tenet of Third Worldism, emphasizing unity and cooperation among countries and peoples of the Global South in the struggle against imperialism, colonialism, and neocolonialism. It embodies the principle of mutual support and shared interests among formerly colonized and oppressed peoples, seeking to address common challenges such as poverty, underdevelopment, and marginalization. Third World solidarity encompasses various forms of collaboration, including diplomatic alliances, economic cooperation, cultural exchange, and mutual aid. It emphasizes the agency and autonomy of the Global South in shaping its own destiny and advocating for a more just and equitable international order.

== Leaders and theorists ==
Several leaders have been associated with and supported the third-worldist movement, including:

- (India) Jawaharlal Nehru
- (Egypt) Gamal Abdel Nasser
- (Socialist Federal Republic of Yugoslavia) Josip Broz Tito
- (Indonesia) Sukarno
- (Palestine) Yasser Arafat
- (Algeria) Houari Boumédiène
- (Guinea-Bissau) Amílcar and Luís Cabral
- (Iran) Ruhollah Khomeini
- (North Vietnam) Ho Chi Minh
- (China) Mao Zedong
- (Democratic Republic of the Congo) Patrice Lumumba
- (Jamaica) Michael Manley
- (Bolivia) Evo Morales
- (Ghana) Kwame Nkrumah
- (Cambodia) Pol Pot
- (Tanzania) Julius Nyerere
- (Libya) Muammar Gaddafi
- (Indonesia) Mohammad Hatta
- (Philippines) Jose Maria Sison
- (Philippines) Rodrigo Duterte
- (Burkina Faso) Thomas Sankara
- (Brazil) Luiz Inácio Lula da Silva
- (Mali) Modibo Keïta
- (Venezuela) Hugo Chávez
- (Angola) Agostinho Neto

Theorists include:

- Samir Amin
- Arghiri Emmanuel
- Frantz Fanon
- Jean-Paul Sartre
- Simone de Beauvoir
- Gilles Deleuze
- Michel Foucault
- Mirsaid Sultan-Galiev
- Noam Chomsky
- Hasan Piker

== See also ==
- Maoism–Third Worldism
- Postcolonialism
- Non-Aligned Movement
- Third World socialism
- Three Worlds Theory
- Neutral and Non-Aligned European States
- League of Fiume
