= War crime =

Act violating the laws of war

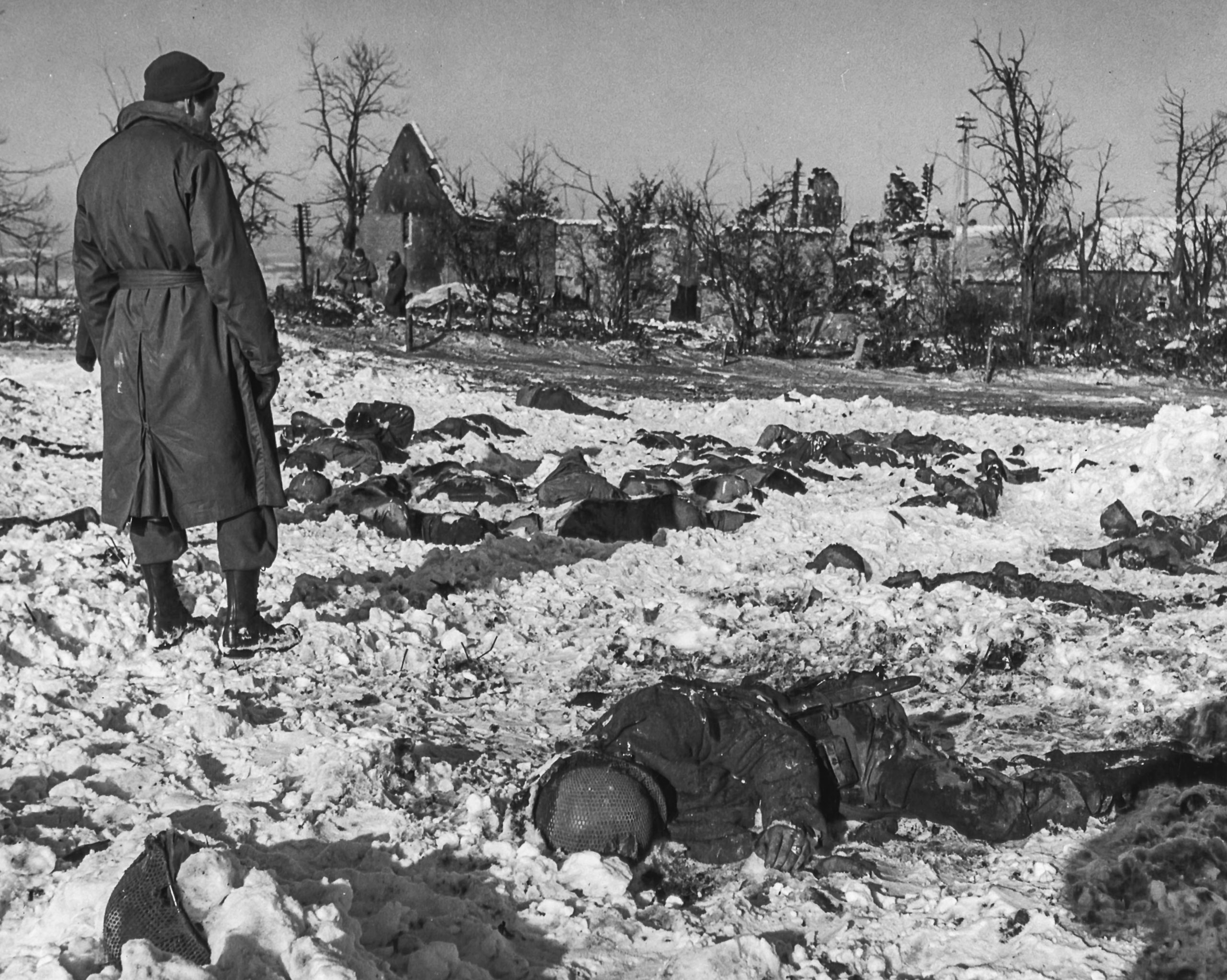
A U.S. soldier observing victims of the Malmedy massacre (December 17, 1944), where 84 U.S. prisoners of war were murdered by the Waffen-SS in Belgium

A war crime is a serious violation of the laws and customs applicable in armed conflict, known as international humanitarian law (IHL) and the law of war, which gives rise to criminal responsibility under international law. Examples of actions committed by combatants in the conduct of war that can give rise to individual criminal responsibility include, but are not limited to: intentionally killing civilians, torture, taking hostages, unnecessarily destroying civilian property, deception by perfidy, wartime sexual violence, pillaging, the granting of no quarter despite surrender, the conscription of children in the military, ordering any attempt to commit mass killings (including genocide or ethnic cleansing), and flouting the requirements of distinction, proportionality and military necessity.

The formal concept of war crimes emerged from countries fighting and the codification of the customary international law that applied to warfare between sovereign states, such as the 1863 Lieber Code of the Union Army in the American Civil War and the Hague Conventions of 1899 and 1907 for international war. In the aftermath of the Second World War, the war crime trials of the leaders of the Axis powers established the Nuremberg principles, such as that international criminal law defines what is a war crime. In 1899, the Geneva Conventions legally defined new war crimes and established that states could exercise universal jurisdiction over war criminals. In the late 20th century and early 21st century, international courts extrapolated and defined additional categories of war crimes applicable to a civil war.

== International humanitarian law ==
=== Definition ===
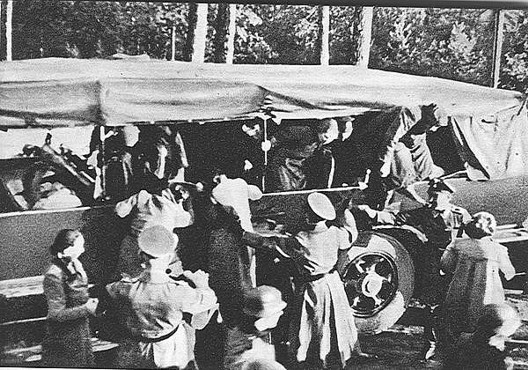
A picture taken by the Polish Underground of Nazi Secret Police rounding up Polish intelligentsia at Palmiry near Warsaw in 1940 for mass execution (AB-Aktion)

War crimes are serious violations of the rules of customary and treaty law concerning international humanitarian law, criminal offenses for which there is individual responsibility.

Colloquial definitions of war crime include violations of established protections of the laws of war, but also include failures to adhere to norms of procedure and rules of battle, such as attacking those displaying a peaceful flag of truce, or using that same flag as a ruse to mount an attack on enemy troops. The use of chemical and biological weapons in warfare are also prohibited by numerous chemical arms control agreements and the Biological Weapons Convention. Wearing enemy uniforms or civilian clothes to infiltrate enemy lines for espionage or sabotage missions is a legitimate ruse of war, though fighting in combat or assassinating individuals behind enemy lines while so disguised is not, as it constitutes unlawful perfidy. Attacking enemy troops while they are being deployed by way of a parachute is not a war crime. Protocol I, Article 42 of the Geneva Conventions explicitly forbids attacking parachutists who eject from disabled aircraft and surrendering parachutists once landed. Article 30 of the 1907 Hague Convention IV – The Laws and Customs of War on Land explicitly forbids belligerents to punish enemy spies without previous trial.

The rule of war, also known as the law of armed conflict, permits belligerents to engage in combat. A war crime occurs when superfluous injury or unnecessary suffering is inflicted upon an enemy. War crimes are significant in international humanitarian law because it is an area where international tribunals such as the Nuremberg Trials and Tokyo Trials have been convened. Recent examples are the International Criminal Tribunal for the Former Yugoslavia and the International Criminal Tribunal for Rwanda, which were established by the Security Council acting under Chapter VIII of the UN Charter.

Under the Nuremberg Principles, war crimes are different from crimes against peace. Crimes against peace include planning, preparing, initiating, or waging a war of aggression, or a war in violation of international treaties, agreements, or assurances. Because the definition of a state of "war" may be debated, the term "war crime" itself has seen different usage under different systems of international and military law. It has some degree of application outside of what some may consider being a state of "war", but in areas where conflicts persist enough to constitute social instability.

War crimes also include such acts as mistreatment of prisoners of war or civilians. War crimes are sometimes part of instances of mass murder and genocide, though these crimes are more broadly covered under international humanitarian law described as crimes against humanity. In 2008, the U.N. Security Council adopted Resolution 1820, which noted that "rape and other forms of sexual violence can constitute war crimes, crimes against humanity or a constitutive act with respect to genocide". In 2016, the International Criminal Court convicted someone of sexual violence for the first time; specifically, they added rape to a war crimes conviction of Congo Vice President Jean-Pierre Bemba Gombo.

War crimes also include deliberate attacks on citizens and property of neutral states, such as the Japanese attack on Pearl Harbor. As the attack on Pearl Harbor happened while the U.S. and Japan were at peace and without a just cause for self-defense, the attack was declared by the Tokyo Trials to go beyond justification of military necessity and therefore constituted a war crime.

The legalities of war have sometimes been accused of containing favoritism toward the winners ("victor's justice"), as some controversies have not been ruled as war crimes. Some examples include the Allies' destruction of Axis cities during World War II, such as the firebombing of Dresden, the Operation Meetinghouse raid on Tokyo (the most destructive single bombing raid in history), and the atomic bombings of Hiroshima and Nagasaki. In regard to the strategic bombing during World War II, there was no international treaty or instrument protecting a civilian population specifically from attack by aircraft; therefore, the aerial attacks on civilians were not officially war crimes. The Allies at the trials in Nuremberg and Tokyo never prosecuted the Germans, including Luftwaffe commander-in-chief Hermann Göring, for the bombing raids on Warsaw, Rotterdam, and British cities during the Blitz, as well as the indiscriminate attacks on Allied cities with V-1 flying bombs and V-2 rockets. The Japanese also did not face prosecution for the aerial attacks on crowded Chinese cities.

Controversy arose when the Allies re-designated German prisoners of war (under the protection of the 1929 Geneva Convention on Prisoners of War) as Disarmed Enemy Forces (allegedly unprotected by the 1929 Geneva Convention on Prisoners of War), many of which were then used for forced labor such as clearing minefields. By December 1945, six months after the war had ended, it was estimated by French authorities that 2,000 German prisoners were still being killed or maimed each month in mine-clearing accidents. The wording of the 1949 Third Geneva Convention was intentionally altered from that of the 1929 convention so that soldiers who "fall into the power" following surrender or mass capitulation of an enemy are now protected as well as those taken prisoner in the course of fighting.

=== United Nations ===
The United Nations defines war crimes as described in Article 8 of the Rome Statute, the treaty that established the International Criminal Court.

=== Rome Statute ===
Article 8 of the Rome Statute of the International Criminal Court defines war crimes as:

1. Grave breaches of the Geneva Conventions of August 12, 1949, namely, any of the following acts against persons or property protected under the provisions of the relevant Geneva Convention:
  1. Willful killing
  2. Torture or inhuman treatment, including biological experiments
  3. Willfully causing great suffering, or serious injury to body or health
  4. Extensive destruction and appropriation of property, not justified by military necessity and carried out unlawfully and wantonly
  5. Compelling a prisoner of war or other protected person to serve in the forces of a hostile Power
  6. Willfully depriving a prisoner of war or other protected person of the rights of fair and regular trial
  7. Unlawful deportation or transfer or unlawful confinement
  8. Taking of hostages
2. Other serious violations of the laws and customs applicable in international armed conflict, within the established framework of international law…
3. In the case of an armed conflict not of an international character, serious violations of article 3 common to the four Geneva Conventions of August 12, 1949… (Note: applies to armed conflicts not of an international character and thus does not apply to situations of internal disturbances and tensions, such as riots, isolated and sporadic acts of violence or other acts of a similar nature.)
4. Other serious violations of the laws and customs applicable in armed conflicts not of an international character, within the established framework of international law… (Note: applies to armed conflicts not of an international character and thus does not apply to situations of internal disturbances and tensions, such as riots, isolated and sporadic acts of violence or other acts of a similar nature. It applies to armed conflicts that take place in the territory of a State when there is protracted armed conflict between governmental authorities and organized armed groups or between such groups.)

=== Other definitions ===
==== Nuremberg Trials ====
Article 6(b) of the Charter of the Nuremberg Tribunal defines war crimes as:

1. War crimes: Violations of the laws or customs of war which include, but are not limited to, murder, ill-treatment or deportation to slave-labour or for any other purpose of civilian population of or in occupied territory, murder or ill-treatment of prisoners of war, of persons on the seas, killing of hostages, plunder of public or private property, wanton destruction of cities, towns, or villages, or devastation not justified by military necessity.

==== Geneva Convention (IV) Relative to the Protection of Civilian Persons in Time of War ====
The four Geneva Conventions of 1949 contain a set of grave breaches that states must prosecute. "These grave breaches are the clearest treaty-based formulation of war crimes." Article 147 defines grave breaches as:

Grave breaches to which the preceding Article relates shall be those involving any of the following acts, if committed against persons or property protected by the present Convention: wilful killing, torture or inhuman treatment, including biological experiments, wilfully causing great suffering or serious injury to body or health, unlawful deportation or transfer or unlawful confinement of a protected person, compelling a protected person to serve in the force of a hostile Power, or wilfully depriving a protected person of the rights of fair and regular trial prescribed in the present Convention, taking of hostages and extensive destruction and appropriation of property, not justified by military necessity and carried out unlawfully and wantonly.

== Legality of civilian casualties ==
Japanese civilian fisherman strafed by USAAF P-51 Mustang machine-gun fire during the World War II Pacific theater, 1945

Under the law of armed conflict, the death of non-combatants is not necessarily a violation; there are many things to take into account. Civilians cannot be made the object of an attack, but the death/injury of civilians while conducting an attack on a military objective are governed under principles such as of proportionality and military necessity and can be permissible. Military necessity "permits the destruction of life of … persons whose destruction is incidentally unavoidable by the armed conflicts of the war; … it does not permit the killing of innocent inhabitants for purposes of revenge or the satisfaction of a lust to kill. The destruction of property to be lawful must be imperatively demanded by the necessities of war."

For example, conducting an operation on an ammunition depot or a terrorist training camp would not be prohibited because a farmer is plowing a field in the area; the farmer is not the object of attack and the operations would adhere to proportionality and military necessity. On the other hand, an extraordinary military advantage would be necessary to justify an operation posing risks of collateral death or injury to thousands of civilians. In "grayer" cases the legal question of whether the expected incidental harm is excessive may be very subjective. For this reason, states have chosen to apply a "clearly excessive" standard for determining whether a criminal violation has occurred.

When there is no justification for military action, such as civilians being made the object of attack, a proportionality analysis is unnecessary to conclude that the attack is unlawful.

=== International Criminal Tribunal for the former Yugoslavia ===
For aerial strikes, pilots generally have to rely on information supplied by external sources (headquarters, ground troops) that a specific position is in fact a military target. In the case of former Yugoslavia, NATO pilots hit a civilian object (the Chinese embassy in Belgrade) that was of no military significance, but the pilots had no idea of determining it aside from their orders. The committee ruled that "the aircrew involved in the attack should not be assigned any responsibility for the fact they were given the wrong target and that it is inappropriate to attempt to assign criminal responsibility for the incident to senior leaders because they were provided with wrong information by officials of another agency". The report also notes that "Much of the material submitted to the OTP consisted of reports that civilians had been killed, often inviting the conclusion to be drawn that crimes had therefore been committed. Collateral casualties to civilians and collateral damage to civilian objects can occur for a variety of reasons."

=== Rendulic Rule ===
The Rendulic Rule is a standard by which commanders are judged. It states that the military necessity of an action must be judged based on the information available to them at that time; they cannot be judged based on information that subsequently comes to light.

German General Lothar Rendulic was charged for ordering extensive destruction of civilian buildings and lands while retreating from a suspected enemy attack in what is called scorched earth policy for the military purpose of denying the use of ground for the enemy. The German troops retreating from Finnish Lapland believed Finland would be occupied by Soviet troops and destroyed many settlements while retreating to Norway under the command of Rendulic. He overestimated the perceived risk but argued that Hague IV authorized the destruction because it was necessary to war. He was acquitted of that charge.

== History ==
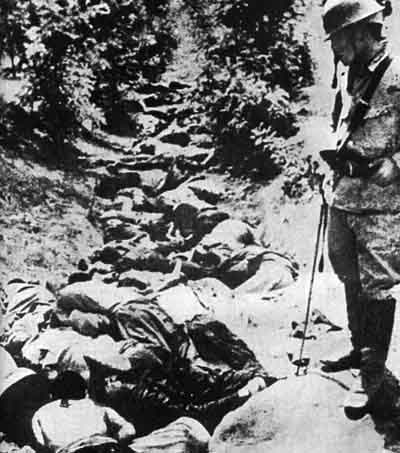
A ditch full of the bodies of Chinese civilians killed by Japanese soldiers in Suzhou, China, 1938

=== Early examples ===
In 1474, the first trial for a war crime was that of Peter von Hagenbach, realised by an ad hoc tribunal of the Holy Roman Empire, for his command responsibility for the actions of his soldiers, because "he, as a knight, was deemed to have a duty to prevent" criminal behaviour by a military force. Despite having argued that he had obeyed superior orders, von Hagenbach was convicted, condemned to death, and beheaded.

=== Hague Conventions ===
The Hague Conventions were international treaties negotiated at the First and Second Peace Conferences at The Hague, Netherlands, in 1899 and 1907, respectively, and were, along with the Geneva Conventions, among the first formal statements of the laws of war and war crimes in the nascent body of secular international law.

=== Lieber Code ===
The Lieber Code was written early in the American Civil War and President Abraham Lincoln issued as General Order 100 on April 24, 1863, just months after the military executions at Mankato, Minnesota. General Order 100, Instructions for the Government of the Armies of the United States in the Field, (Lieber Code) was written by Franz Lieber, a German lawyer, political philosopher, and veteran of the Napoleonic Wars. Lincoln made the Code military law for all wartime conduct of the Union Army. It defined command responsibility for war crimes and crimes against humanity as well as stated the military responsibilities of the Union soldier fighting the Confederate States of America.

=== Geneva Conventions ===
The Geneva Conventions are four related treaties adopted and continuously expanded from 1864 to 1949 that represent a legal basis and framework for the conduct of war under international law. Every single member state of the United Nations has currently ratified the conventions, which are universally accepted as customary international law, applicable to every situation of armed conflict in the world. The Additional Protocols to the Geneva Conventions adopted in 1977 containing the most pertinent, detailed and comprehensive protections of international humanitarian law for persons and objects in modern warfare are still not ratified by several states continuously engaged in armed conflicts, namely the United States, Israel, India, Pakistan, Iraq, Iran, and others. Accordingly, states retain different codes and values about wartime conduct. Some signatories have routinely violated the Geneva Conventions in a way that either uses the ambiguities of law or political maneuvering to sidestep the laws' formalities and principles.

The first three conventions have been revised and expanded, with the fourth one added in 1949:

- The First Geneva Convention for the Amelioration of the Condition of the Wounded and Sick in Armed Forces in the Field was adopted in 1864 and then significantly revised and replaced by the 1906 version, the 1929 version, and later the Fourth Geneva Convention of 1949.
- The Second Geneva Convention for the Amelioration of the Condition of Wounded, Sick and Shipwrecked Members of Armed Forces at Sea was adopted in 1906 and then significantly revised and replaced by the Fourth Geneva Convention of 1949.
- The Third Geneva Convention relative to the Treatment of Prisoners of War was adopted in 1929 and then significantly revised and replaced by the Fourth Geneva Convention of 1949.
- The Fourth Geneva Convention relative to the Protection of Civilian Persons in Time of War was first adopted in 1949, based on parts of the 1907 Hague Convention IV.

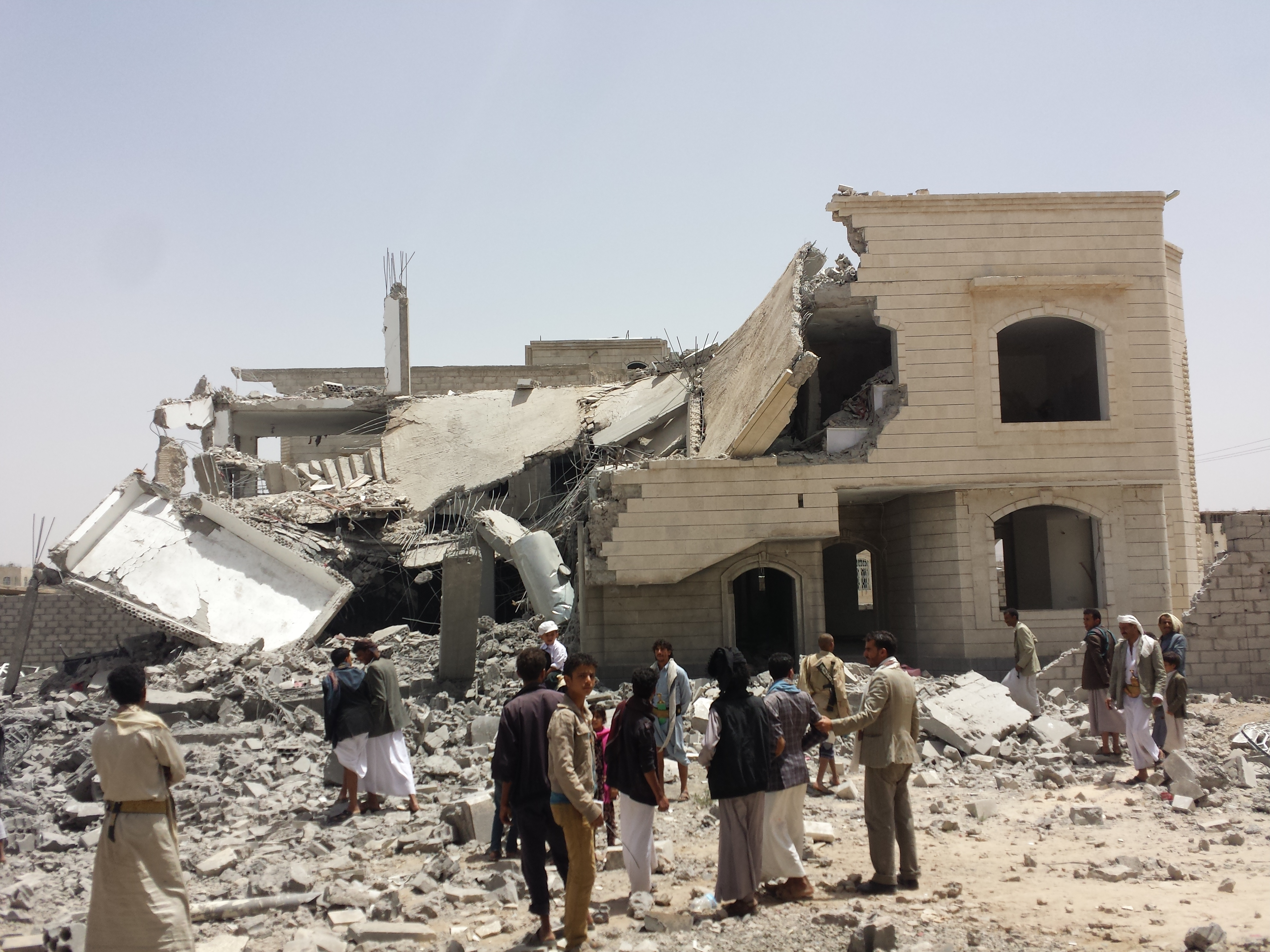
HRW wrote that the Saudi Arabian-led military intervention in Yemen that began on March 26, 2015, involved airstrikes in apparent violation of the laws of war.

Two Additional Protocols were adopted in 1977 with the third one added in 2005, completing and updating the Geneva Conventions:

- Protocol I (1977) relating to the Protection of Victims of International Armed Conflicts.
- Protocol II (1977) relating to the Protection of Victims of Non-International Armed Conflicts.
- Protocol III (2005) relating to the Adoption of an Additional Distinctive Emblem.

=== Leipzig trials ===
Just after the First World War, world governments started to try to systematically create a code for how war crimes would be defined. Their first outline of a law was Instructions for the Government of Armies of the United States in the Field, also known as the "Lieber Code". A small number of German military personnel of the World War I were tried in 1921 by the German Supreme Court for alleged war crimes.

=== Nuremberg trials 1945 ===
The modern concept of war crime was further developed under the auspices of the Nuremberg trials based on the definition in the London Charter that was published on August 8, 1945 (see Nuremberg principles). Along with war crimes the charter also defined crimes against peace and crimes against humanity, which are often committed during wars and in concert with war crimes.

=== International Military Tribunal for the Far East 1946 ===
Also known as the Tokyo Trial, the Tokyo War Crimes Tribunal was convened on May 3, 1946, to try the leaders of the Empire of Japan for three types of crimes: "Class A" (crimes against peace), "Class B" (war crimes), and "Class C" (crimes against humanity), committed during the Second World War.

=== International Criminal Court ===
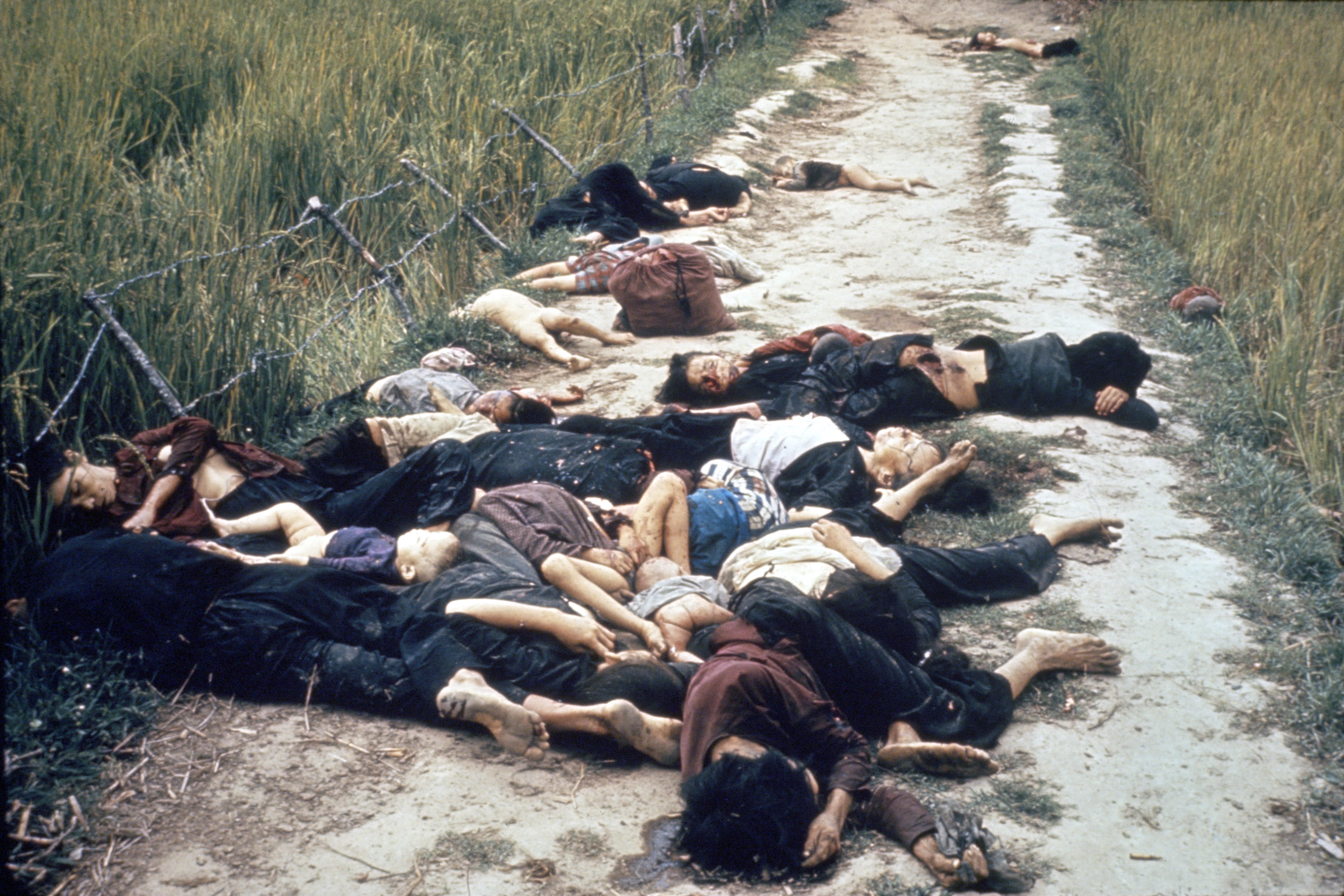
Bodies of some of the hundreds of Vietnamese villagers who were killed by U.S. soldiers during the My Lai massacre

On July 1, 2002, the International Criminal Court, a treaty-based international court located in The Hague, came into being for the prosecution of war crimes committed on or after that date. Several nations, most notably the United States, China, Russia, and Israel, have criticized the court. The United States still participates as an observer. Article 12 of the Rome Statute provides jurisdiction over the citizens of non-contracting states if they are accused of committing crimes in the territory of one of the state parties.

The ICC only has jurisdiction over these crimes when they are "part of a plan or policy or as part of a large-scale commission of such crimes".

== Prominent indictees ==
=== Heads of state and government ===
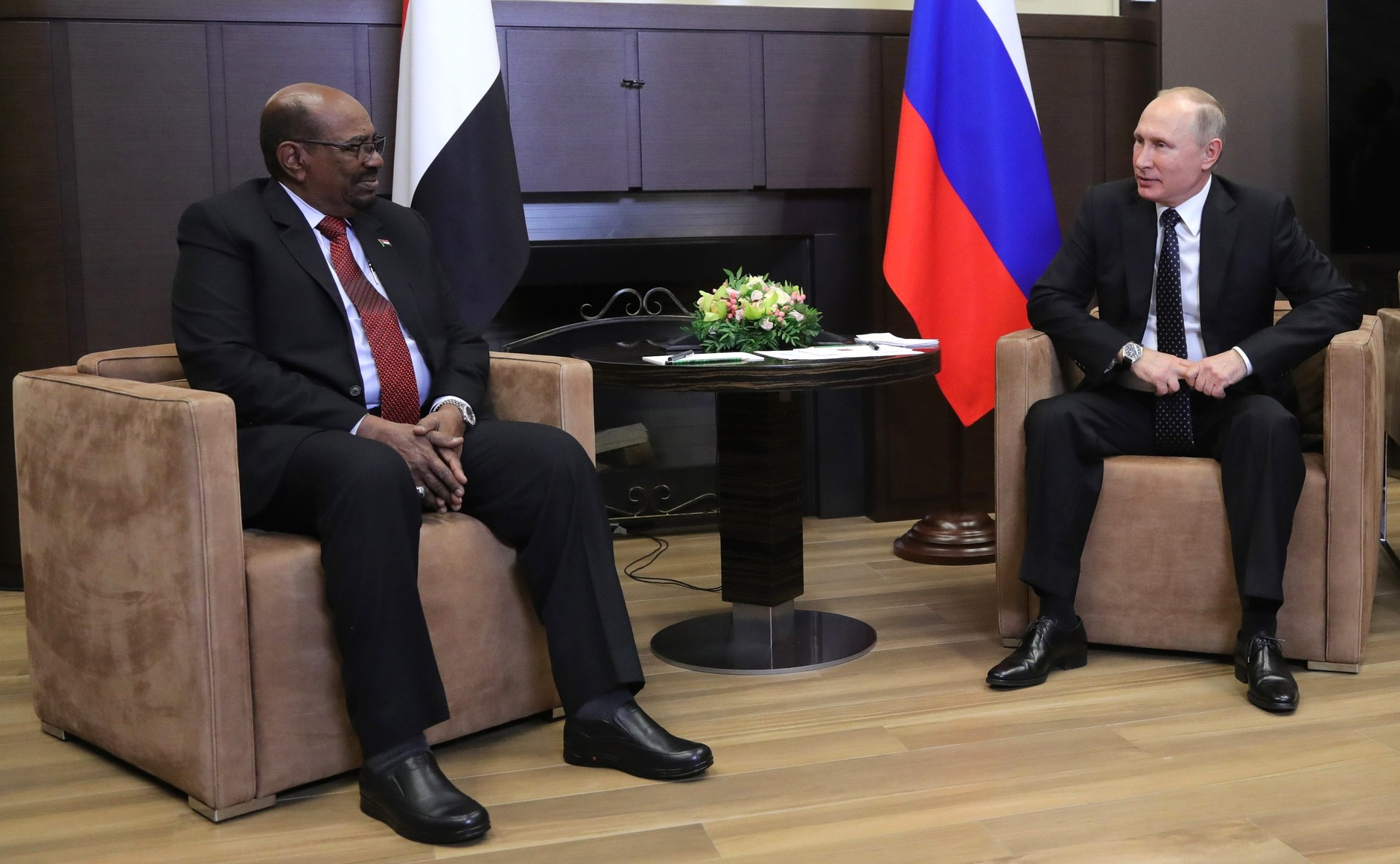
Former Sudanese President Omar al-Bashir (left) and Russian President Vladimir Putin (right), both charged by the ICC for war crimes

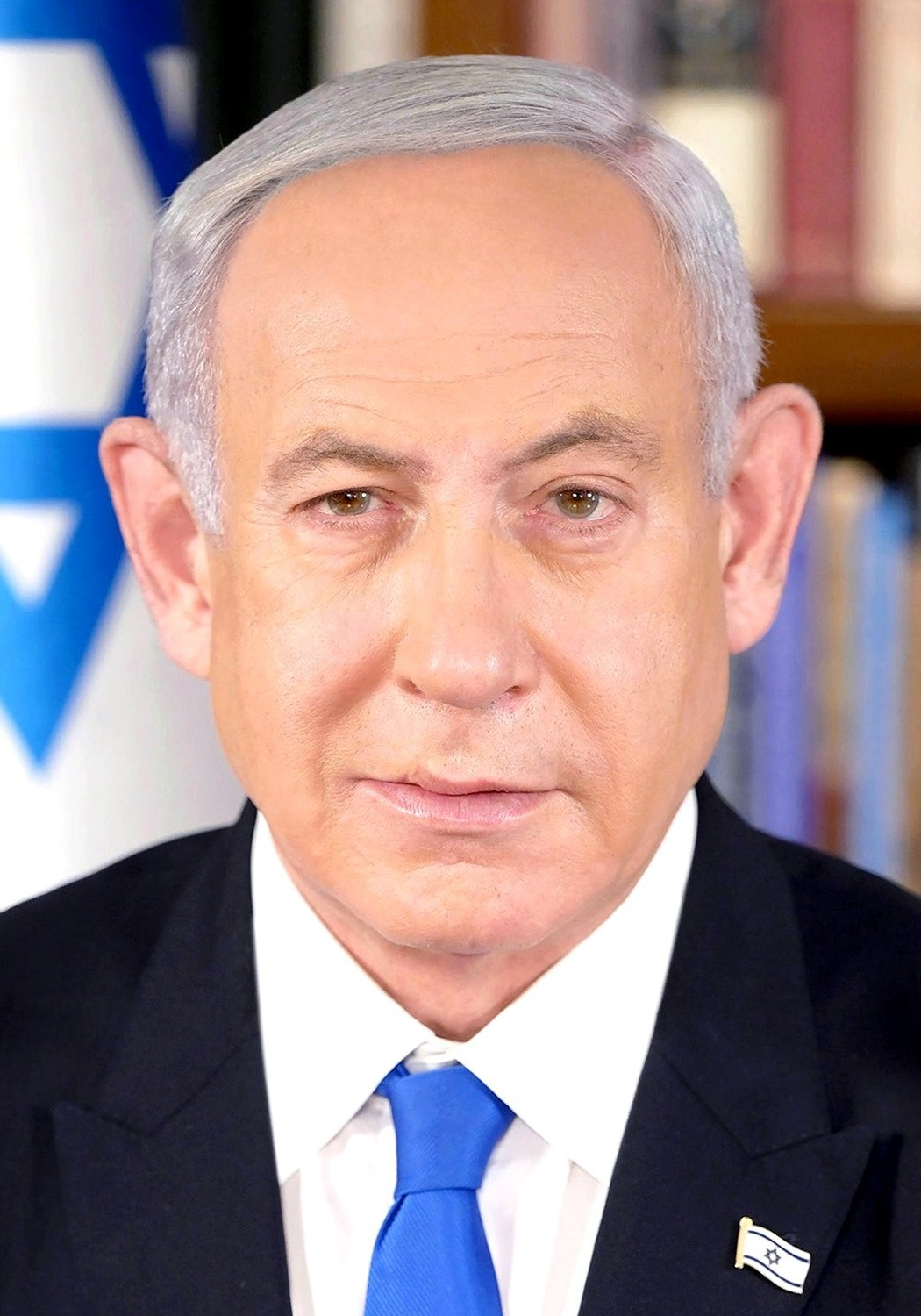
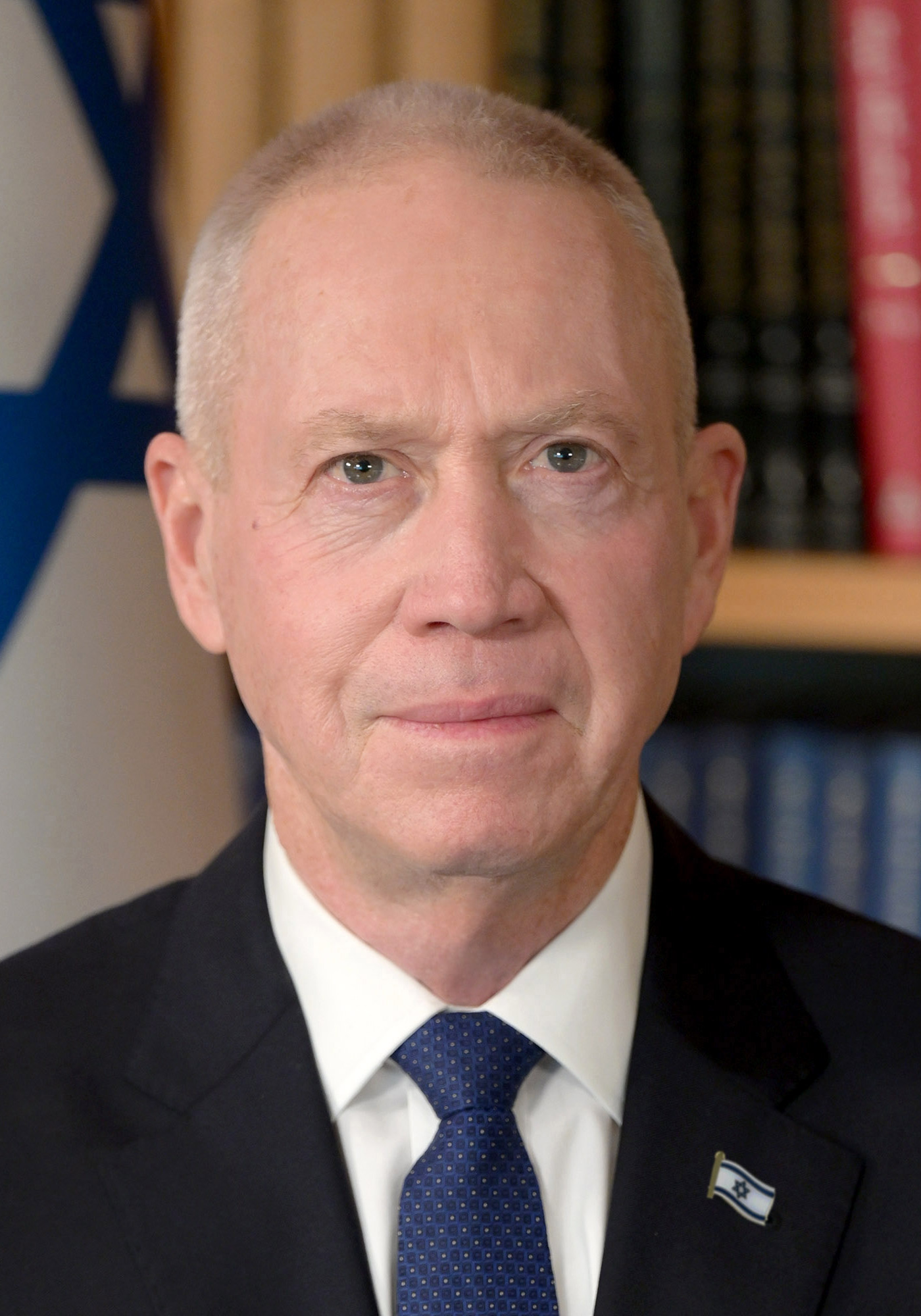
Israeli Prime Minister, Benjamin Netanyahu (left) and former Minister of Defense, Yoav Gallant (right). Both have been charged with war crimes and have arrest warrants issued against them by the ICC.

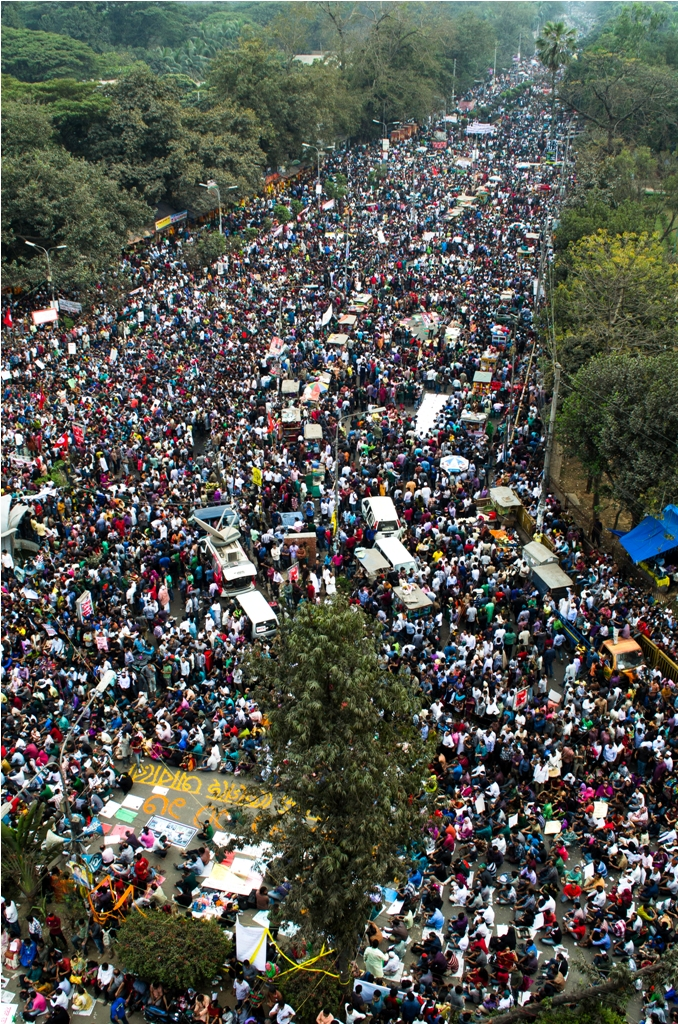
2013 Shahbag protests demanding the death penalty for the war criminals of the 1971 Bangladesh Liberation War

To date, the present and former heads of state and heads of government that have been charged with war crimes include:

- Russian President Vladimir Putin, for his contribution in the illegal abduction of children from Ukraine and deportation into Russia during the Russian invasion of Ukraine.
- The International Criminal Court issued arrest warrants for Israeli Prime Minister Benjamin Netanyahu and his former Defense Minister Yoav Gallant for alleged war crimes and crimes against humanity in the Gaza war.
- German Großadmiral and President Karl Dönitz, Japanese Prime Ministers and Generals Hideki Tōjō and Kuniaki Koiso, Austrian Chancellor Arthur Seyss-Inquart, Hungarian Prime Minister Ferenc Szálasi, and Romanian Prime Minister Ion Antonescu in the aftermath of World War II.
- Former Serbian President Slobodan Milošević was brought to trial charged with genocide, crimes against humanity, and war crimes in three republics. This pertained to superior command responsibility for the Bosnia and Croatia indictments, and individual responsibility for the Kosovo indictment. His legal motion to be acquitted was denied in 2004, and he died in custody in 2006, before the trial ended.
- Former Liberian President Charles G. Taylor was also brought to The Hague charged with war crimes; his trial stretched from 2007 to March 2011. He was convicted in April 2012 of aiding and abetting crimes against humanity.
- Former Bosnian Serb President Radovan Karadžić was arrested in Belgrade on July 18, 2008, and brought before Belgrade's War Crimes Court a few days later. He was extradited to the Netherlands, and is currently in The Hague, in the custody of the International Criminal Tribunal for the former Yugoslavia. The trial began in 2010. On March 24, 2016, he was found guilty of genocide in Srebrenica, war crimes, and crimes against humanity, 10 of the 11 charges in total, and sentenced to 40 years' imprisonment. He was sentenced to life on appeal.
- Omar al-Bashir, former head of state of Sudan, is charged with three counts of genocide, crimes against humanity and other war crimes regarding the war in the Darfur region of Sudan.
- Former Libyan leader Muammar Gaddafi was indicted for allegedly ordering the killings of protesters and civilians and crimes against humanity, during the 2011 Libyan civil war, and was killed in October 2011 before he could stand trial.
- Former Peruvian President Alberto Fujimori was charged with several counts of human rights violations committed by his government and affiliated death squads during his regime.
- President of Kosovo Hashim Thaçi was charged with overseeing atrocities during his time as an officer in the Kosovo Liberation Army, including murder, torture, cruel treatment and arbitrary detention. Also charged were Jakup Krasniqi, Rexhep Selimi and Kadri Veseli.

=== Other ===
- Ali Hassan Abd al-Majid al-Tikriti, more commonly known by his nickname "Chemical Ali", executed by post-Ba'athist Iraq for his leadership of the gassing of Kurdish villages during the Iran-Iraq War; also governor of illegally occupied Kuwait during the First Gulf War.
- William Calley, former U.S. Army officer found guilty of murder for his role in the My Lai massacre.
- Hermann Göring, Commander in Chief of the Luftwaffe.
- Seishirō Itagaki, War minister of the Empire of Japan.
- Ernst Kaltenbrunner and Adolf Eichmann, high-ranking members of the SS.
- Wilhelm Keitel, Generalfeldmarschall, head of the Oberkommando der Wehrmacht.
- General Tikka Khan, a.k.a. "Butcher of Bengal" was a notorious Pakistan Army General known for his war crimes in Bangladesh during the Indo-Pakistani War of 1971.
- Joseph Kony, leader of the Lord's Resistance Army, guerrilla group which used to operate in Uganda.
- Iwane Matsui, general of the Imperial Japanese Army who was known for his involvement in the Nanjing Massacre.
- Ratko Mladić, indicted for genocide amongst other violations of humanitarian law during the Bosnian War; he was captured in Serbia in May 2011 and was extradited to face trial in The Hague, wherein he was found guilty and sentenced to life in prison.
- Erich Raeder, Großadmiral, Commander in Chief of the Kriegsmarine.
- Albert Speer, Minister of Armaments and War Production in Nazi Germany 1942–45.
- Yoshijirō Umezu, general of the Imperial Japanese Army.

== See also ==
=== Country listings ===
- Allied war crimes during World War II
- Australian war crimes
- British war crimes
- Croatian war crimes
- East Timor genocide
- Category:French war crimes
- German war crimes
  - Consequences of Nazism
  - The Holocaust
  - War crimes of the Wehrmacht
- International Military Tribunal for the Far East
- Israeli war crimes
  - Gaza genocide
- Italian war crimes
- Japanese war crimes
- Category:War crimes in the Korean War
- Palestinian war crimes
- Rwandan genocide
- Russian war crimes
- Serbian war crimes
- Soviet war crimes
- Turkish war crimes
- United Arab Emirates war crimes
- United States Senate Committee on the Philippines
- United States war crimes
- Vietnam War § War crimes

=== Legal issues ===
- Command responsibility
- Law of war
- Rule of Law in Armed Conflicts Project
- Special Court for Sierra Leone
- War Crimes Act 1991
- War Crimes Act of 1996

=== Miscellaneous ===
- Civilian internee
- Commando Order
- Commissar Order
- Crime of aggression
- Human shield
- International Criminal Court investigations
- List of denaturalized former citizens of the United States, including those citizens who were denaturalized for concealing their involvement in war crimes in order to obtain that country's citizenship
- Mass atrocity crimes
- Mass killing
- Military use of children
- Nazi human experimentation
- Nuremberg Principles
- State-sponsored terrorism
- Terror bombing
- Unlawful combatant
- War and genocide
- Wartime sexual violence
