= Croatian war crimes =

The following articles deal with Croatian war crimes:

- Croatian war crimes in World War II (1939–1945)
- Croatian war crimes in the Yugoslav Wars (1991–1995)
