= Emirati war crimes =

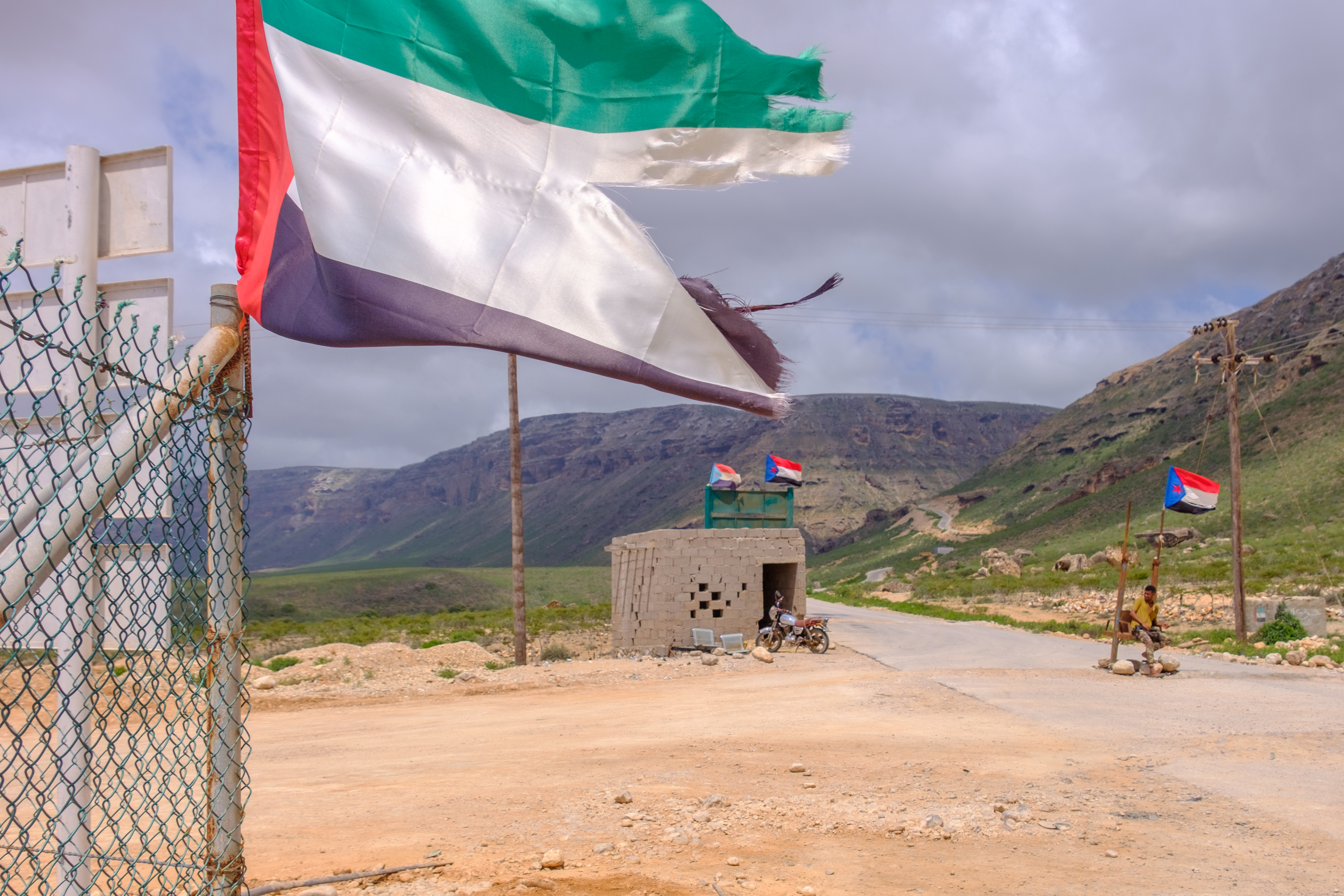
Roadblock of the Southern Transitional Council in the south of Socotra that was funded by the United Arab Emirates

The United Arab Emirates (UAE) war crimes are violations of international criminal law (including war crimes, crime against humanity and complicity in torture) which the Emirates has committed or is accused of committing, primarily in Yemen, Libya, and Sudan. These accusations include arbitrary detention, torture, enforced disappearances, and cruel and inhuman treatment. Additionally, the Emirates has been complicit in civil wars by acting as a conduit for arms and supporting abusive local militias.

== Definition ==
War crimes are defined as serious violations of international humanitarian law committed during armed conflicts. These violations encompass acts that target civilians, employ prohibited weapons, and cause unnecessary suffering. The UAE is a signatory and is a party to the principles outlined in the four Geneva Conventions of 1949, which mandate the protection of civilians and those out of combat, ensuring that even in times of conflict, basic human rights are upheld. The UAE legislation sentences regarding war crimes range from imprisonment to the death penalty for those breaching provisions in the context of international or non-international armed conflict.

== Yemen ==
=== Yemeni Civil War ===
The United Arab Emirates was an influential member of the Saudi Arabia-led coalition that intervened in the Yemeni civil war in March 2015, when the Emirates deployed 30 aircraft to participate in the operations. Since then, Human Rights Watch (HRW) has documented nearly 90 unlawful attacks, including multiple war crimes, conducted by the coalition. The alliance indiscriminately attacked homes, schools, hospitals and markets in Yemen, widely used banned weapons (like cluster munitions), and obstructed aid. The UN Secretary-General Antonio Guterres held the UAE and Saudi-led coalition responsible for the grave violations against children in the Yemen conflict.

In May 2017, the UAE backed the formation of the Southern Transitional Council (STC), under the leadership of Major General Aidarus al-Zoubaidi. The council was declared illegitimate by the then-President Abdrabbuh Mansur Hadi, who alleged Abu Dhabi's Mohammed bin Zayed of acting as an occupier of Yemen. The Emirates’ proxy forces were discovered committing abuses, which is included excessive use of force during arrests, arbitrary detention, detention of family members of suspects, detention of children, and enforced disappearance. A report by HRW claimed that the UAE was funding, training, as well as instructing the proxy forces, which have committed brutal abuses. It also stated that the UAE defies international regulations by detaining, threatening, harassing, and condemning activists for criticizing the Emirates’ actions.

In June 2017, an investigation by the Associated Press documented 18 secret prisons run by the UAE in southern Yemen. The secret prisons held several men who were captured in a hunt for al-Qaeda militants and committed grave human rights violations, including abuse and extreme torture. The report revealed that the prisons used a “grill” to tie victims to a rod, and they were spun in a circle of fire. The investigation also revealed direct involvement of US forces, who were alleged of interrogating detainees.

A report in October 2018 revealed that the UAE had hired American mercenaries to carry out assassinations in 2015. The program targeted the Emirates’ political rivals in Yemen, majorly the member of Al-Islah. The first assassination operation took place in December 2015, involving the private US security firm, Spear Operations Group, and its chief operating officer, Isaac Gilmore. The company's founder, Abraham Golan, stated the targeted assassination program was “sanctioned” by the Emirates. Between 2015 and 2018, a total of 160 killings were conducted, of which only 23 had links to terrorism. The firm deployed the same tactics for all killings, in which a distraction is caused by the detonation of an improvised explosive device (IED), and then the targets are shot. The UAE, however, denied the reports claiming that it was behind the assassinations in southern Yemen.

An investigation by the CNN in February 2019 revealed that the UAE and Saudi-led coalition were transferring the US-made weapons to al-Qaeda, Salafi militants and other fighters in Yemen. The US Defense Department said it didn't authorize the Emirates and Saudi Arabia to re-transfer any equipment to the fighters in Yemen. The US was amongst the biggest arms suppliers to the Emirates and Saudi. Consequently, American weaponry was a crucial support for the coalition to continue the war, which led to deaths of tens of thousands people, including children. The UN Panel of Experts on Yemen also claimed that the foreign weapons purchased by the UAE were being misused and were contributing to the violation of international laws, including the criminalizing of elements of the war.

=== Socotra ===
On 30 April 2018, the United Arab Emirates (UAE) deployed more than a hundred troops with artillery and armored vehicles to the Yemeni archipelago of Socotra in the Guardafui Channel without prior coordination with the Yemeni government, causing relations between the two countries to deteriorate. The initial deployment consisted of UAE military aircraft carrying more than fifty UAE soldiers and two armored vehicles, followed by two more aircraft carrying more soldiers, tanks, and other armored vehicles. Al Jazeera reported that shortly after landing, UAE forces dismissed Yemeni soldiers stationed at administrative installations such as Socotra Airport and seaports until further notice, and the flag of the United Arab Emirates was raised above at official government buildings in Hadibu. On 14 May an agreement was reached between the UAE and Yemen which saw Yemen regain administrative control and Saudi Arabian troops also being deployed to the island.

== Libya ==
The UAE intervened in the Libya civil war as a powerful supporter of the military commander Khalifa Haftar and his Libyan National Army (LNA). Rights groups have accused the Emirates of committing multiple war crimes in Libya, citing direct air strikes on civilians and the human loss caused by them. A May 2020 UN report revealed that two Dubai-based firms, Lancaster 6 DMCC and Opus Capital Asset Limited FZE, supported Haftar's mission by deploying Western mercenaries to Libya.

From 2019 through 2020, over 850 drone strikes and 170 strikes by fighter-bombers were conducted by the UAE in Libya on behalf of Haftar. In January 2020, the “Antonov 124” aircraft, which is owned by Mohammed bin Zayed, was used for shipment of 3,000 tons of military supplies to Haftar. In April 2020, the UAE deployed a secretly-purchased, advanced, Israeli-made missile system in Libya, through Haftar. In the same month, 11,000 tonnes of jet fuel worth nearly $5 million were sent to Haftar's forces in violation of the UN arms embargo on Libya. In September 2020, a UN report claimed that the Emirates had violated the Libyan arms embargo, as it intensified the supply of military equipment to Haftar. The UN arms embargo on Libya was signed by the Mohammed bin Zayed. The Emirati weaponry and strikes led to the deaths of thousands of people and created a significant humanitarian catastrophe.

Amnesty International noted that arms supplied by countries like the UAE led the warring sides to disregard international laws. Attacks and air strikes struck multiple civilian properties, hospitals, a school, a migrant detention centre, and Tripoli's Mitiga International Airport. The LNA used the Chinese Wing Loong drone, which was supplied by the Emirates, to conduct one of the deadliest attacks on a hospital in July 2019. The UAE also supplied Haftar's LNA the Chinese Wing loong II drone, and operated them from Libya's al-Khadim airbase to attack unarmed cadets at Tripoli's military academy, in January 2020. The strike killed 26 cadets, the majority of whom were teenagers.

Apart from supplying weapons, the UAE also deployed armed Sudanese groups to the Libyan conflict to fight alongside Haftar's forces. A report by the UN Panel of Experts revealed that the UAE had “direct relations” with these armed groups. According to the US Pentagon, the UAE was a major financial supporter of the Russian Wagner Group's mercenaries deployed to fight for Haftar against the US-backed Government of National Accord (GNA) in Libya.

The UAE-backed LNA fighters were also involved in the beating, torture and electrocution of civilians in the Tarhuna region. Haftar aligned with the ruling Kaniyat militia of the region to carry out atrocities. In 2020, after the region was recaptured by the GNA, mass graves were discovered in Tarhuna. Nearly 120 bodies, with only 59 identified, were recovered from the mass graves.

== Sudan ==
Before the current civil war, according to US authorities in control of a network of Gulf-based enterprises, Hemedti had close family ties to the UAE which relates to the Rapid Support Forces.

Following the RSF retreat from Khartoum in March 2025, the UAE has increased supplies of advanced weapons, which have been transferred since the beginning of the civil war. Cargo arms shipments surged via Chad, Libya, and Somalia which enabled Rapid Support Forces attacks and territorial consolidation, particularly in El Fasher, North Darfur.

In April 2025, Sudan accused the United Arab Emirates in the International Court of Justice of funding genocide in the ongoing civil war by supplying weapons to the Rapid Support Forces, which has committed several war crimes, including massacres and violence against the Masalit people in West Darfur. In response of the accusations, the United Arab Emirates rejected the claims of supporting the group and the ICJ case as a "political farce". On 5 May 2025 the ICJ threw out the case, stating that it "manifestly lacked" authority to rule on the case.

In November 2025, after the El Fasher massacre, Sudanese Prime Minister Kamil Idris who has been accusing the UAE of financially backing the RSF, called countries to declare the RSF a "terrorist organization," and refused to participate in peace discussions involving the UAE, viewing it as an untrustworthy mediator.

The UAE denied accusations by not claiming responsibility of any involvement in the genocide.

== See also ==
- Australian war crimes
- British war crimes
- German war crimes
- Israeli war crimes
- Italian war crimes
- Japanese war crimes
- List of war crimes
- Russian war crimes
- Turkish war crimes
- United States war crimes
