= Consequences of Nazism =

Nazism and the acts of Nazi Germany affected many countries, communities, and people before, during and after World War II. Nazi Germany's attempt to exterminate several groups viewed as subhuman by Nazi ideology was eventually stopped by the combined efforts of the wartime Allies headed by the United Kingdom, the Soviet Union, and the United States.

== Jewish people ==
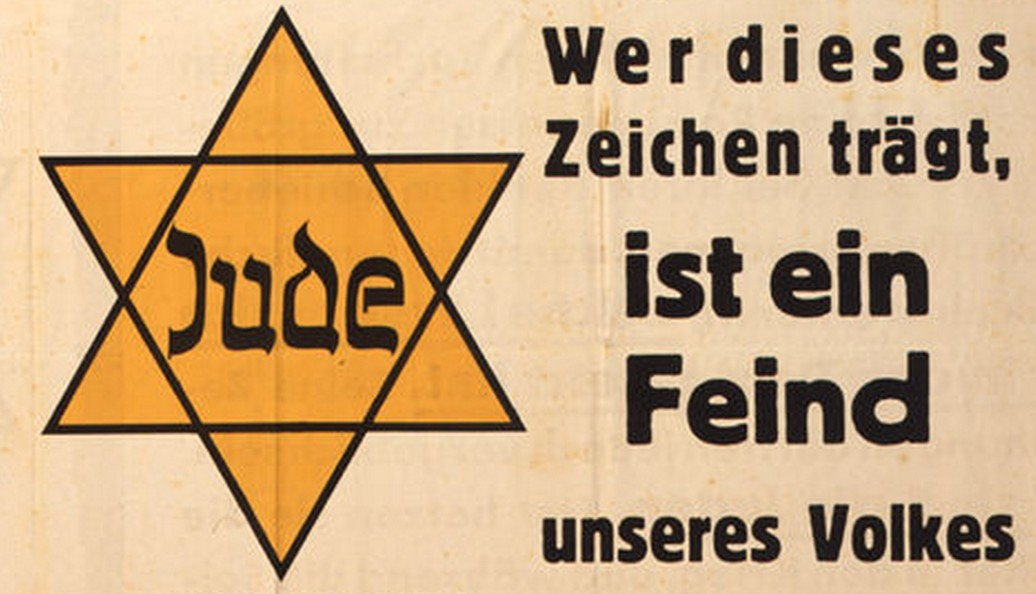
"Whoever wears this sign is an enemy of our people" – Parole der Woche, 1 July 1942

Of the world's 18 million Jews in 1939, more than a third were murdered in the Holocaust. Of the three million Jews in Poland, the heartland of European Jewish culture, fewer than 60,000 survived. Most of the remaining Jews in Eastern and Central Europe became refugees, unable or unwilling to return to countries that became Soviet puppet states or countries that had betrayed them to the Nazis.

== Poland ==
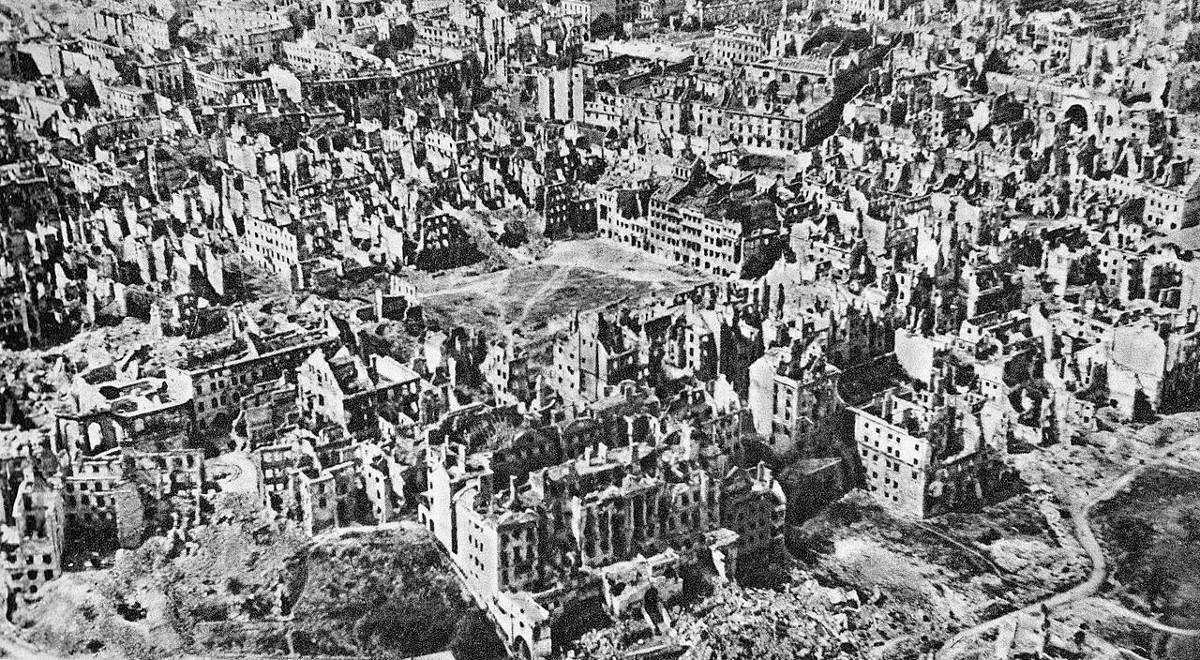
During World War II 85% of buildings in Warsaw were destroyed by German troops.

The Nazis intended to destroy the Polish nation completely. In 1941, the Nazi leadership decided that Poland was to be fully cleared of ethnic Poles within 10 to 20 years and settled by German colonists to further their policy of Lebensraum. From the beginning of the occupation, Germany's policy was to plunder and exploit Polish territory, turning it into a giant concentration camp for Poles who were to be exterminated as "Untermenschen". The policy of plunder and exploitation inflicted material losses to Polish industry, agriculture, infrastructure and cultural landmarks, with the cost of the destruction by Germans alone estimated at €525 billion or $640 billion. Remaining Polish industry was mostly destroyed, or transported to Russia by Soviet forces following the war.

The official Polish government report of war losses prepared in 1947 reported 6,028,000 war victims out of a population of 27,007,000 ethnic Poles and Jews alone. For political reasons, the report excluded the losses to the Soviet Union and the losses among Polish citizens of Ukrainian and Belarusian origin.

Poland's eastern border was significantly moved westwards to the Curzon Line. The resulting territorial loss of 188,000 km^{2} (73,000 sq mi) (formerly populated by 5.3 million ethnic Poles) was to be compensated by the addition of 111,000 km^{2} (43,000 sq mi) of former German territory east of the Oder–Neisse line (formerly populated by 11.4 million ethnic Germans). Kidnapping of children by Nazi Germany also took place, in which children who were believed to hold German blood were taken away; around 20,000 Polish children were taken away from their parents. Out of the abducted only 10–15% returned home. Polish elites were decimated and over half of the Polish intelligentsia were murdered. Some professions lost 20–50% of their members, for example 58% of Polish lawyers, 38% of medical doctors and 28% of university workers were exterminated by the Nazis. The Polish capital Warsaw was razed by German forces and most of its old and newly acquired cities lay in ruins (e.g. Wrocław) or lost to the Soviet Union (e.g. Lwów). In addition Poland became a Soviet satellite state, remaining under the rule of a Soviet-controlled communist government until 1989. Russian troops did not withdraw from Poland until 1993, following the collapse of the Soviet Union in 1991.

=== See also ===
- Nazi war crimes in occupied Poland during World War II
- Expulsion of Poles by Germany
- Generalplan Ost
- German AB-Aktion in Poland
- The Holocaust in Poland
- Occupation of Poland (1939–1945)
- Operation Tannenberg
- Intelligenzaktion
- Chronicles of Terror

== Soviet Union ==
About 26 million Soviet citizens perished as a result of the Nazi invasion of the Soviet Union, including around 10,651,000 soldiers who died in battle against Hitler's armies or died in POW camps. According to Russian historian Vadim Erlikhman, Soviet losses amounted to 26.5 million war related deaths. Millions of civilians also died from starvation, exposure, atrocities, and massacres, and a huge area of the Soviet Union from the suburbs of Moscow and the Volga River to the western border had been destroyed, depopulated, and reduced to rubble. The mass death and destruction there badly damaged the Soviet economy, society, and national psyche. The death toll included c.a. 1.5 million Soviet Jews killed by the German invaders. The mass destruction and mass murder was one of the reasons why the Soviet Union installed satellite states in Central Europe; as the government hoped to use the countries as a buffer zone against any new invasions from the West. This helped break down the wartime alliance between the Soviet Union and the Western Allies, setting the stage for the Cold War, which lasted until 1989, two years before the dissolution of the Soviet Union in 1991. Soviet culture in the 1950s was defined by results of the Great Patriotic War.

Close to 60% of the European war dead were from the Soviet Union. Military losses of 10.6 million include 7.6 million killed or missing in action and 2.6 million POW dead, plus 400,000 paramilitary and Soviet partisan losses. Civilian deaths totaled 15.9 million which included 1.5 million from military actions. 7.1 million victims of Nazi genocide and reprisals; 1.8 million deported to Germany for forced labour; and 5.5 million famine and disease deaths. Additional famine deaths which totaled 1 million during 1946–47 are not included here. These losses are for the entire territory of the USSR including territories annexed in 1939–40.

To the north, the Germans reached Leningrad (Saint Petersburg) in August 1941. The city was surrounded on 8 September, beginning a 900-day siege during which about 1.2 million citizens perished.

Of the 5.7 million Soviet prisoners of war who were captured by the Germans, more than 3.5 million died while they were in German captivity by the end of the war. On 11 February 1945, at the conclusion of the Yalta Conference, the United States and United Kingdom signed a Repatriation Agreement with the USSR. The Allied program of repatriation of Soviet citizens saw 4.2 million people returned to the USSR. Statistical data from Soviet archives, declassified in the 1990s, attest that the overall increase of the Gulag population was minimal during 1945–46 and only 272,867 of repatriated Soviet POWs and civilians (or 6.5 percent) were imprisoned.

=== Belarus ===
Belarus lost a quarter of its pre-war population, including almost all of its intellectual elite, and 90% of its Jewish population. Following bloody encirclement battles, all of the territory of present-day Belarus was occupied by the Germans by the end of August 1941. The Nazis imposed a brutal regime, deporting some 380,000 young people for slave labour, and killing hundreds of thousands of other civilians. At least 5,295 Belarusian settlements were destroyed by the Nazis and either some or all of their inhabitants were killed (out of 9,200 settlements that were burned or otherwise destroyed in Belarus during World War II). More than 600 villages like Khatyn were burned along with their entire populations. More than 209 cities and towns (out of 270 total) were destroyed. Himmler had announced a plan according to which 3/4 of the Belarusian population was designated for "eradication" and 1/4 of the racially purer Belarusian population (blue eyes, light hair) would be allowed to serve the Germans as their slaves (Ostarbeiter).

Some recent estimates raise the number of Belarusians who perished during the War to "3 million 650 thousand people, higher than the former estimate of 2.2 million. In other words, not every fourth inhabitant but about 40% of the pre-war Belarusian population perished (considering the present-day borders of Belarus)." This compares to 15% of Poland's post war borders and 19% of Ukrainian population in post war border and comparing to 2% of Czechoslovak population that perished in post war borders.

=== Ukraine ===
Estimates of population losses in Ukraine range from 7 million to 11 million. More than 700 cities and towns and 28,000 villages were destroyed.

=== See also ===
- Drang nach Osten
- Special settlements in the Soviet Union
- Generalplan Ost
- Hunger Plan
- German occupation of Byelorussia during World War II
- Operation Keelhaul
- Victims of Nazi Germany
- War crimes in World War II
- World War II casualties

== Central and Eastern Europe ==
The defeat of Nazi Germany and the postwar settlement transformed Central and Eastern Europe. As Soviet forces occupied much of the region in 1944-45, the USSR emerged with decisive influence there, a development that became a point of dispute among the Allies both during and after the Yalta Conference. In the years immediately after the war, occupying Soviet forces supported communist takeovers and the restructuring of governments and economies on a Stalinist model, forming what became known as the Eastern Bloc.

Economic reconstruction proceeded under central planning and within a separate Soviet-led sphere. The USSR opposed the U.S.-backed Marshall Plan and prevented Eastern European participation (including Czechoslovakia), and the program was therefore confined to Western Europe.

The postwar settlement also involved major population transfers, including the expulsion of millions of German-speaking civilians from parts of Central and Eastern Europe, contributing to a broader refugee and displaced persons crisis in postwar Europe.

=== See also ===
- Formation of the Eastern Bloc
- Cominform
- Flight and expulsion of Germans (1944–1950)

== Western Europe ==
The defeat of Nazi Germany left Western Europe devastated and financially strained, contributing to Western Europe's relative decline in global power as the United States and the Soviet Union emerged as the dominant great powers. In the late 1940s, recovery in much of Western Europe became closely linked to U.S. economic assistance through the Marshall Plan (European Recovery Program), which aimed to rebuild production and stabilize the region.

The postwar crisis also weakened the capacity of Western European powers to sustain their overseas colonies. Decolonization accelerated after 1945 as European states faced financial constraints, rising anti-colonial nationalism, and shifting international norms, contributing to the rapid dismantling of colonial rule in Asia and Africa in the following decades. Western European governments also pursued new forms of regional cooperation intended to prevent a renewed war; early initiatives are often associated with the 1950 Schuman Declaration.

== Yugoslavia ==
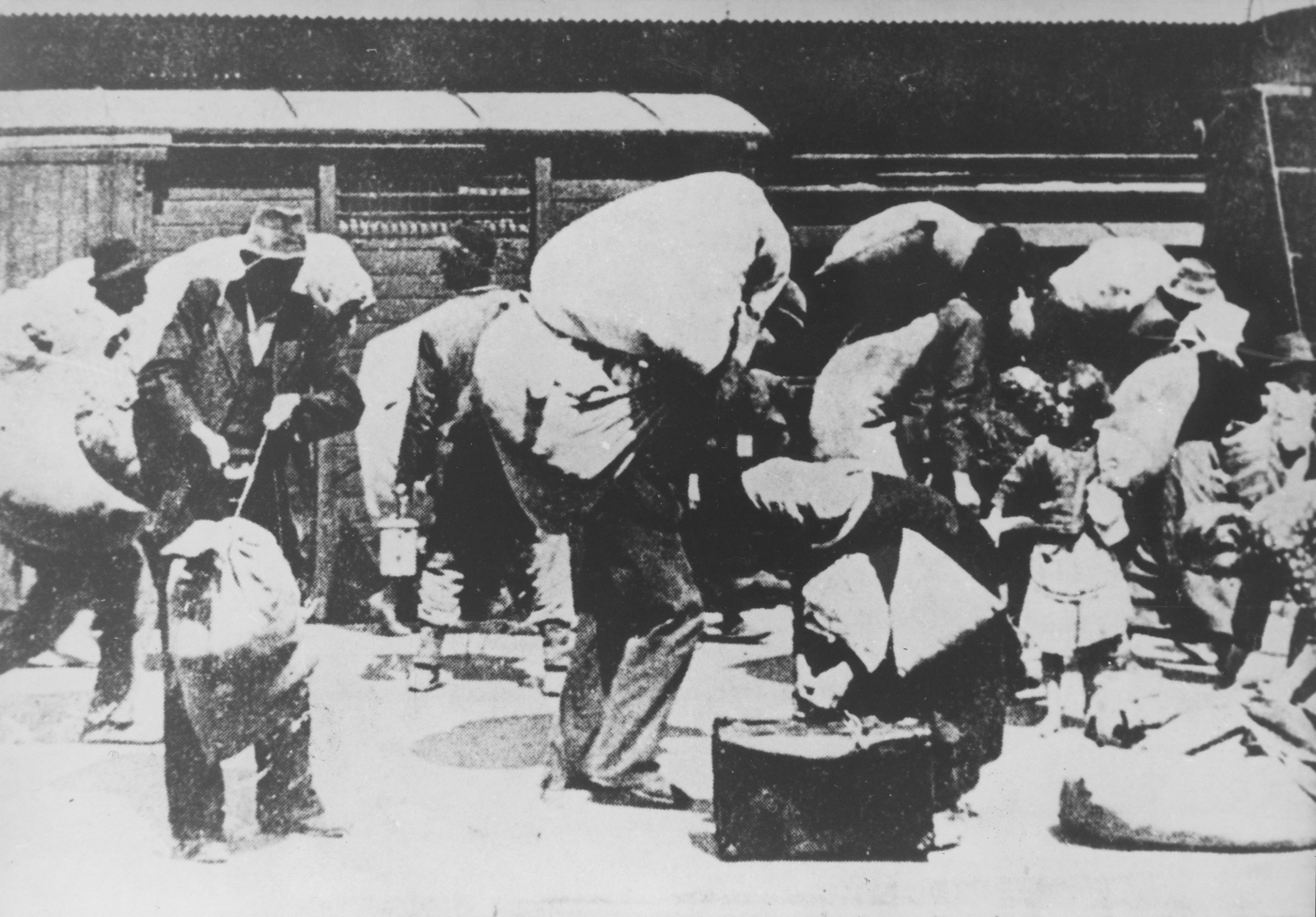
Due to their strong opposition to Nazism, Serbs were considered enemies of Nazi Germany. Alongside Jews, Serbs were killed and expelled from wartime Yugoslavia.

It is estimated that 1,700,000 people were killed during World War II in Yugoslavia from 1941 to 1945. Very high losses were suffered by the Serbs who lived in Bosnia and Croatia, as well as by Jewish and Romani minorities, and losses were also high among all other non-collaborating populations. In the summer of 1941, the Serbian uprising occurred during the German invasion of the USSR. The Nazi response was the execution of 100 Serbian civilians for every German soldier who was killed and the execution of 50 Serbian civilians for every German soldier who was wounded. The Yugoslav Partisans waged a guerrilla campaign against the Axis occupiers and they also waged a civil war against the Chetniks. The Independent State of Croatia was established as a Nazi puppet-state, ruled by the fascist militia which was known as the Ustaše. During that time, the Independent State of Croatia constructed concentration camps for the purpose of imprisoning and killing anti-fascists, communists, Serbs, Muslims, Romanies and Jews, one of the most infamous concentration camps was the Jasenovac concentration camp. A large number of men, women and children, mostly Serbs, were murdered in these camps.

== Greece ==
In Greece, the German occupation (April 1941 – October 1944) destroyed the economy through war reparations, plundering of the country's resources and hyper-inflation. In addition, the Germans left most of the country's infrastructure in ruins as they withdrew in 1944. As a result of an Allied blockade and German indifference to local needs, the first winter of the occupation was marked by widespread famine in the main urban centres, with as many as 300,000 civilians dead from starvation. Although these levels of starvation were not repeated in the following years, malnourishment was common throughout the occupation. In addition, thousands more were executed by German forces as reprisals for partisan activities. As part of the Holocaust, Greece's Jewish community was almost wiped out, especially the large Sephardi community of Thessaloniki, which had earned the city the sobriquet "Mother of Israel" and had first settled there in the early 16th century at the invitation of the then-ruling Ottoman Empire. In total, at least 81% (ca. 60,000) of Greece's total pre-war Jewish population was murdered.

The bitterest and longest-lasting legacy of the German occupation was the social upheaval it wrought. The old political elites were sidelined, and the Resistance against the Axis brought to the fore the leftist National Liberation Front (EAM), arguably the country's first true mass-movement, where the Communists played a central role. In an effort to oppose its growing influence, the Germans encouraged the pre-war conservative establishment to confront it, and allowed the creation of armed units. As elsewhere in Eastern Europe, in the last year of the occupation, conditions in Greece often approximated a civil war between EAM and other powers. The rift would become permanent in December 1944, when EAM and the British-backed government clashed in Athens, and again in a fully fledged civil war from 1946 to 1949.

== Germany ==
Lost territories and postwar occupation zones in Germany

More than 8 million Germans, including almost 2 million civilians, died during World War II (see World War II casualties). Following the end of the war in Europe, additional German casualties were incurred during the Allied occupation as well as during the expulsions of ethnic Germans that were carried out in Eastern Europe in the aftermath of the war.

Following the war, Germans were viewed with contempt and as a result, they were frequently blamed for Nazi crimes, especially for crimes which were committed in countries which were occupied by Nazi Germany. Germans who visited other countries, particularly during the 1950s and 1960s, were frequently insulted by locals and foreigners, many of whom were the relatives or friends of people who were killed in the atrocities. Today in Europe as well as in countries which are located outside Europe (particularly in countries that fought against the Axis), Germans are scorned by elderly people who suffered as a result of the atrocities which were committed by Nazi Germans during World War II. These experiences triggered a feeling of collective guilt among many Germans, causing numerous discussions and rows among scholars and politicians in Post-War West Germany (for example, the "Historikerstreit" [historians' argument] in the 1980s) and after Reunification. Here, the discussion mainly revolved around the role that the unified Germany should play in the world as well as the role that it should play in Europe. Bernard Schlink's novel The Reader describes the various and the diverging ways in which post-war Germans grappled with this issue.

Following World War II, the Allies embarked on a program of denazification in their zones of occupation, but, as the Cold War intensified, these efforts were curtailed in West Germany, where leading politicians like Konrad Adenauer encouraged Germans to move on from the Nazi years and embrace a new, democratic Germany which was an ally of the West.

Germany as a whole and the German economy in particular was devastated, because large parts of most major German cities were destroyed in the bombing raids which were carried out by the Allied forces, Germany's sovereignty was taken away by the Allies and its territory was filled with millions of refugees from the former eastern provinces which the Allies had decided would be annexed by the Soviet Union and Poland, moving the eastern German border westwards to the Oder–Neisse line, effectively reducing Germany in size by roughly 25% (see also Potsdam Conference). The remaining parts of Germany were divided among the Allies and they were also occupied by British (the north-west), French (the south-west), American (the south) and Soviet (the east) troops.

The expulsions of Germans from the lost areas in the east (see also Former eastern territories of Germany), the Sudetenland, and elsewhere in eastern Europe went on for several years. The number of German expellees probably totaled 15,000,000. Estimates of the number of deaths which resulted from the expulsion range from less than 500,000 to 3 million.

After a short period of time, the Allies broke over ideological problems (Communism versus Capitalism), and both sides established their own spheres of influence, creating a previously non-existent division between East and West in Germany (although the division largely followed the borders of states which had existed in Germany before Bismarck's unification less than 100 years before).

A constitution for East Germany was drafted on 30 May 1949. Wilhelm Pieck, a leader of the Socialist Unity Party of Germany (SED) (which was created by a forced merger of the Social Democratic Party of Germany (SPD) and Communist Party of Germany (KPD) in the Soviet sector), was elected first President of the German Democratic Republic.

West Germany, officially the Federal Republic of Germany (FRG), received de facto semi-sovereignty in 1949, as well as a constitution, called the Grundgesetz (Basic Law). Officially, the document was not called a Constitution, because at that time, it was still hoped that the two German states would be reunited in the near future.

The first free elections in West Germany were held in 1949, which were won by the Christian Democratic Union of Germany (CDU, conservatives) by a slight margin. Konrad Adenauer, a member of the CDU, was the first Bundeskanzler (Chancellor) of West Germany.

In 1948, both German states introduced their own forms of money, colloquially called the West-Mark and the Ost-Mark the (Western Mark and the Eastern Mark).

Foreign troops still remain in Germany today, for example on the Ramstein Air Base, but the majority left Germany following the end of the Cold War (By 1994 for Soviet troops, mandated under the terms of the Treaty on the Final Settlement with Respect to Germany and in the mid-1990s for Western forces). The Bush Administration in the United States in 2004 stated its intention to withdraw most of the remaining American troops from Germany in the following years. During the years 1950–2000 more than 10,000,000 U.S. military personnel were stationed in Germany.

The West German economy was rebuilt by the mid-1950s thanks to the abandonment of some of the last vestiges of the Morgenthau Plan in mid-1947 and thanks to a reduction in the amount of war reparations imposed on West Germany (see also Wirtschaftswunder). After lobbying by the Joint Chiefs of Staff, and Generals Clay and Marshall, the Truman administration realized that the economic recovery of Europe could not go forward without the reconstruction of the German industrial base on which it had previously been dependent. In July 1947, President Harry S. Truman rescinded on "national security grounds" the punitive JCS 1067, which had directed the U.S. forces of occupation in Germany to "take no steps looking toward the economic rehabilitation of Germany." It was replaced by JCS 1779, which instead stressed that "[a]n orderly, prosperous Europe requires the economic contributions of a stable and productive Germany."

At that time, the dismantling of factories in the western zones, for the purpose of transporting them to the Soviet Union as a form of reparations, was halted as frictions grew between East and West. Limits were placed on levels of German production in order to prevent the resurgence of German militarism, part of which included a severe restriction on the production of German steel, a restriction which affected the rest of the German economy very negatively (see "Allied plans for German industry"). The dismantling of factories by France and Great Britain as reparations and for the purpose of lowering German war and economic potential under the "level of industry plans" took place (halted in 1951), but it was nowhere near the scale of the dismantling of factories in the eastern zone of occupation and the transportation of them to the Soviet Union. The Eastern Bloc did not accept the Marshall Plan, denouncing it as American economic imperialism, thus, it (East Germany included) recovered much more slowly than its Western counterpart. German political and economic control of the Ruhr area was for a time under international control: the International Authority for the Ruhr (IAR) was created as part of the agreement negotiated at the London Six-Power Conference in June 1948 to establish the Federal Republic of Germany. In the end, German control of the Ruhr was restored, with the start of the Cold War and the establishment of the European Coal and Steel Community (ECSC). The ECSC led to the pooling of German coal and steel markets within a multinational community in 1951. The neighboring Saar area, which contained much of Germany's remaining coal deposits, was handed over to a French economic administration as a protectorate by the US in 1947 and it did not politically return to Germany until January 1957, and its economic reintegration occurred a few years later. Upper Silesia, Germany's second largest center of mining and industry, had been handed over to Poland at the Potsdam Conference.

The Allies confiscated intellectual property of great value, for example all German patents, both in Germany and abroad, and used them to strengthen their own industrial competitiveness by licensing them to Allied companies. Beginning immediately after the German surrender and continuing for the next two years, the U.S. pursued a vigorous program to harvest all technological and scientific know-how as well as all patents in Germany. John Gimbel comes to the conclusion, in his book Science Technology and Reparations: Exploitation and Plunder in Postwar Germany, that the "intellectual reparations" taken by the U.S. and the UK amounted to close to $10 billion. During the more than two years that this policy was in place, no industrial research in Germany could take place, as any results would have been automatically available to overseas competitors who were encouraged by the occupation authorities to access all records and facilities. Meanwhile, thousands of the best German researchers were being put to work in the Soviet Union and in the US (see also Operation Paperclip).

For several years following the surrender, German nutritional levels were very low, resulting in very high mortality rates. Throughout all of 1945, the U.S. forces of occupation ensured that no international aid reached ethnic Germans. It was directed that all relief went to non-German displaced persons, liberated Allied POWs, and concentration camp inmates. During 1945 it was estimated that the average German civilian in the US and UK occupation zones received 1200 calories a day. Meanwhile, non-German displaced persons were receiving 2300 calories through emergency food imports and Red Cross help. In early October 1945, the UK government privately acknowledged in a cabinet meeting that German civilian adult death rates had risen to 4 times the pre-war levels and death rates amongst the German children had risen by 10 times the pre-war levels. The German Red Cross was dissolved, and the International Red Cross and the few other allowed international relief agencies were kept from helping Germans through strict controls on supplies and travel. The few agencies permitted to help Germans, such as the indigenous Caritasverband, were not allowed to use imported supplies. When the Vatican attempted to transmit food supplies from Chile to German infants, the US State Department forbade it. The German food situation reached its worst during the very cold winter of 1946–1947 when German calorie intake ranged from 1,000 to 1,500 calories per day, a situation made worse by severe lack of fuel for heating. Meanwhile, the Allies were well fed, average adult calorie intake was; U.S. 3200–3300; UK 2900; U.S. Army 4000. German infant mortality rate was twice that of other nations in Western Europe until the end of 1948.

As agreed to by the Allies at the Yalta conference, Germans were used as forced labourers as a form of the reparations which would be extracted by the countries which were ruined by Nazi aggression. By 1947, it is estimated that 4,000,000 Germans (both civilians and POWs) were being used as forced laborers by the U.S., France, the UK and the Soviet Union. For example, German prisoners were forced to clear minefields in France and the Low Countries. By December 1945, the French authorities estimated that 2,000 German prisoners were being killed or maimed in accidents each month. In Norway the last available casualty record, from 29 August 1945, shows that by that time a total of 275 German soldiers died while clearing mines, while 392 had been maimed. Death rates for the German civilians doing forced labor in the Soviet Union ranged between 19% and 39%, depending on category. (see also Forced labor of Germans in the Soviet Union).

Norman Naimark writes in The Russians in Germany: A History of the Soviet Zone of Occupation, 1945–1949, that although the exact number of women and girls who were raped by members of the Red Army in the months which preceded the capitulation as well as in the years which followed it will never be known, at least, hundreds of thousands of women and girls were raped, at most, 2,000,000 women and girls were raped, according to an estimate which was made by Barbara Johr, in Befreier und Befreite. Many of these victims were repeatedly raped . Naimark states that not only did each victim have to carry the trauma with her for the rest of her days, it inflicted a massive feeling of collective trauma on the East German nation (the German Democratic Republic). Naimark concludes "The social psychology of women and men in the soviet zone of occupation was marked by the crime of rape from the first days of occupation, through the founding of the GDR in the fall of 1949, until – one could argue – the present."

The post-war hostility which the German people were subjected to is exemplified by the fate of the war children, who were sired by German soldiers who had sexual relations with women who were members of the local population in nations such as Norway, where the children and their mothers had to endure many years of abuse after the war. In the case of Denmark, the hostility which was directed at all things German was also manifested in the treatment of German refugees during the years from 1945 to 1949. During 1945 alone, 7000 German children who were under the age of 5 died as a result of being denied sufficient food and medical attention by Danish doctors who were afraid that rendering aid to the children of the former enemy would be seen as an unpatriotic act. Many children died of easily treatable ailments. As a consequence, "more German refugees died in Danish camps, "than Danes did during the entire war.""

During the Cold War, it was either difficult or impossible for West Germans to visit their relatives and their friends who lived in East Germany and vice versa. For East Germans, especially after the construction of the Berlin Wall on 13 August 1961 and until Hungary opened its border to the West in the late 1980s, thus allowing hundreds of thousands of vacationing East Germans to flee into Western Europe, it was only possible to get to West Germany by illegally fleeing across heavily fortified and guarded border areas.

44 years following the end of World War II, the Berlin Wall fell on 9 November 1989. The Eastern and Western parts of Germany were reunited on 3 October 1990.

The economic and social divisions which previously existed between East and West Germany continue to play a major role in contemporary German politics and society. It is likely that the contrast between the generally well-off and the economically diverse West and the weaker, heavy-industry reliant East will continue to exist, at least into the foreseeable future.

=== See also ===
- Berlin Wall
- Cold War
- German reunification
- Germany
  - East Germany
  - West Germany
- History of Germany (1945–1990)
- Marshall Plan
- Ostpolitik

== World politics ==
The war led to the discrediting and dissolution of the League of Nations and it also led to the founding of the United Nations (UN) on 24 October 1945. Like its predecessor, the UN was established in order to help nations prevent the outbreak of another world war and contain or end smaller conflicts. The principles enshrined in the Charter of the United Nations are a testament to the world's attitudes following the defeat of Nazi Germany. Geopolitically, the United States and the Soviet Union emerged as the two new dominant rivaling superpowers. Consequently, two political blocks arose, one around the US and another around the USSR. The rivalry resulted in the Cold War and led to several proxy conflicts. Briefly, before its final decline as a superpower, Great Britain also counted as a member of the "Big Three", a term used to refer to the world's major global powers (the US, USSR and Britain at the time).

== International law ==
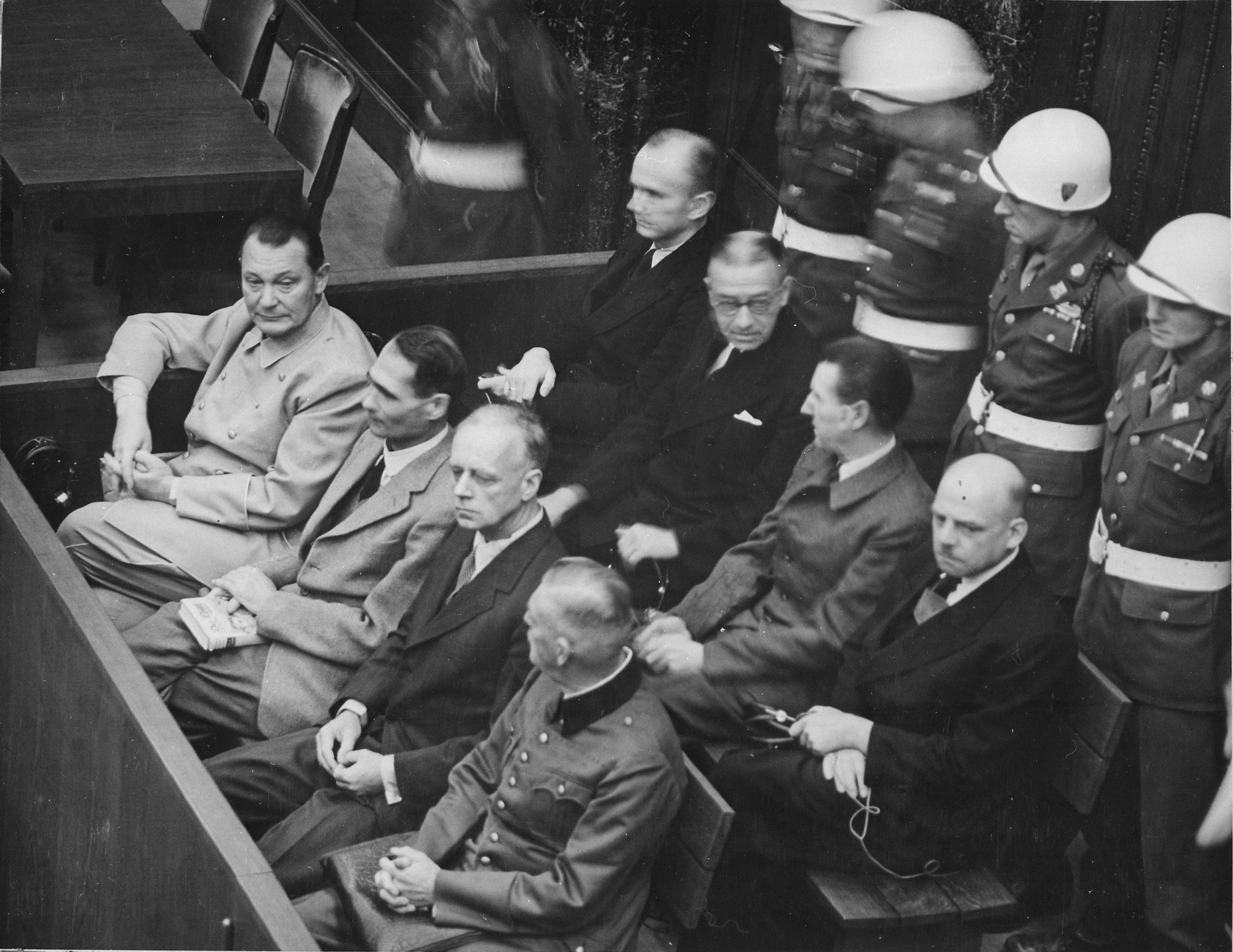
Nuremberg Trials. Defendants in the dock. The main target of the prosecution was Hermann Göring (at the left edge on the first row of benches), considered to be the most important surviving official in Nazi Germany following Hitler's death.

The effect the Nazis had on present-day international law was substantial. The United Nations Genocide Convention, a series of laws that made genocide a crime, was approved on 9 December 1948, three years following the Nazi defeat. That same month, the Universal Declaration of Human Rights also became a part of international law. The Nuremberg trials, followed by other Nazi war crimes trials, also created an unwritten rule stating that government officials who "follow orders" from leaders in committing crimes against humanity cannot use such a motive to excuse their crimes. It also had an effect through the Fourth Geneva Convention (Art 33) in making collective punishments a war crime.

== Racism ==
After the world viewed the Nazi death camps, many Western people began to outwardly oppose ideas of racial superiority. Liberal anti-racism became a staple of many Western governments, which openly looked down upon or banned racist publications. The move towards the tolerance of different cultures has continued to develop in Western societies until the present day. Since the collapse of Nazi Germany, Western populations have been wary of racist political parties and as a result, they have actively discouraged expressions of white ethnocentrism, fearing the recurrence of a catastrophe which would be similar to the purges which the Nazis carried out in Germany. On the other hand, it can be argued that the conception of multiculturalism has gained importance as one of the pillars of contemporary Western society because of the same reaction. The actions of the Nazis caused an intensification of anti-German sentiment, culminating in the flight and expulsion of Germans from Central and Eastern Europe during the aftermath of World War II.

== Military ==
German military doctrine under the Nazi regime, characterized with some controversy as blitzkrieg, called for air strikes that softened an intended victim for attack by motorized, mechanized, and airborne forces on the schwerpunkt (focal point), followed by encirclement by motorized forces, and exploitation of the gap by conventional infantry forces. Radio communication allowed for the close coordination necessary for such attacks, and allowed for coordination of the air force. The Nazis as much broke the rules of engagement which previously governed nations at war (such violations often deemed following the war as crimes against peace) as they innovated techniques of war. Axis reverses beginning with Allied routs of overextended German forces in El Alamein and Stalingrad resulted from British and Soviet forces adopting Nazi field strategies, and as the United States became a participant in the war it adopted much the same techniques of aerial attack upon Nazi Germany, if with greater force than the Luftwaffe could ever inflict.

As Nazi Germany faced severe defeat following the Battle of Kursk and especially the cross-channel invasion it introduced cross-channel use of the V-1 flying bomb and V-2 rocket, although too late and too ineffectively to turn the war to its advantage. The German military machine was developing jet aircraft as fighters and bombers and long-range missiles, but far too late (they were only in the design and test stages) to change the outcome of the war. The victorious Allies would incorporate the early innovations of jet technology and long-distance rocket-based missiles into their armed forces, but only after the end of World War II after getting them beyond the developmental stages of design and testing.
