= Australian war crimes =

Australian war crimes are acts confirmed or alleged to have been committed by the Australian Defence Force that have violated the laws and customs of war. In March 2023, Australia arrested a former SAS veteran over war crimes committed during the war in Afghanistan, becoming the first arrest of an Australian soldier for war crimes under Australian law.

== WWI ==
Surafend massacre was a premeditated massacre committed against inhabitants of the village of Sarafand al-Amar (modern-day Tzrifin) and a Bedouin camp in Ottoman Palestine by occupying Australian, New Zealand and Scottish soldiers on 10 December 1918. On the night of 9 December, a New Zealand soldier named Leslie Lowry was killed by a thief who had stolen his kitbag. Lowry died without speaking, but alongside his body the troops found some pieces of evidence, including a piece of Arabic clothing, and (allegedly) a set of footprints leading towards Surafend. In response, around 200 ANZAC troops massacred its male inhabitants and burned down the village in retaliation.

== Vietnam ==
According to a Vietnam War veteran, at the Nui Dat military base, Australian soldiers killed several Vietnamese civilian bamboo pickers and were instructed to place weapons on their bodies.

== Afghanistan ==
The 2020 Brereton Report found that Australian special forces had been involved in 39 unlawful killings in Afghanistan. This included a practice of "blooding" where junior soldiers were told to get their first kill by shooting a prisoner.

On 7 April 2026, former soldier Ben Roberts-Smith was arrested for allegedly murdering Afghan civilians between 2009 and 2012.

== Iraq ==
Several Australian figures have described former Prime Minister John Howard as a war criminal for his decision to participate in the 2003 invasion of Iraq. Some notable examples include:

- John Valder, former president of the federal Liberal Party
- Lyn Allison, Australian Democrats Senator
- Andrew Wilkie, Independent MP and former infantry officer
- Paul Keating, former Prime Minister of Australia

Additionally, former Malaysian Prime Minister Mahathir Mohamad labelled Howard a war criminal.

== See also ==
- List of massacres of Indigenous Australians
- Allied war crimes during World War II
- British war crimes
- United States war crimes
- Israeli war crimes
- Russian war crimes
- Turkish war crimes
- United Arab Emirates war crimes
- Yazidi genocide
