= Croatian war crimes in World War II =

Croatian war crimes in World War II may refer to:

- The Holocaust in Croatia
- Genocide of Serbs in the Independent State of Croatia
- Porajmos
