= Formation of the Eastern Bloc =

The Eastern Bloc is a collective term for the former Communist countries in Central and Eastern Europe. This generally encompasses the Soviet Union and the countries of the Warsaw Pact.

When Soviet Foreign Minister Vyacheslav Molotov expressed concern that the Yalta Agreement's wording might impede Stalin's plans in Central Europe, Stalin responded "Never mind. We'll do it our own way later." After Soviet forces remained in Eastern and Central European countries, with the beginnings of Communist puppet regimes installed in those countries, by falsified elections, Churchill referred to the region as being behind an "Iron Curtain" of control from Moscow.

== Initial control process ==
The initial problem in countries occupied by the Red Army in 1944–45 was how to transform occupation power into control of domestic development. Because Communists were small minorities in all countries but Czechoslovakia, they were initially instructed to form coalitions in their respective countries. Soviet takeover of control at the outset generally followed a process:

- a general coalition of left-wing, Anti-fascist forces;
- a reorganised 'coalition' in which the Communists would have the upper hand and neutralise those in other parties who were not willing to accept their supremacy;
- complete Communist domination.

It was only in the People's Federal Republic of Yugoslavia that former partisans entered their new government independently of Soviet influence. It was the latter's publicly stubborn independent political stances, its insistence on specifically not being a puppet regime, that led to the Tito–Stalin split and the other moves towards a "Titoism" that quickly made Communist Yugoslavia an independent nation outside the major power blocs.

== Property relocation ==
By the end of World War II, most of Eastern Europe, and the Soviet Union in particular, suffered vast destruction. The Soviet Union had suffered a staggering 27 million deaths, and the destruction of significant industry and infrastructure, both by the Nazi Wehrmacht and the Soviet Union itself in a "scorched earth" policy to keep it from falling in Nazi hands as they advanced over 1,600 kilometres (1,000 mi) to within 24 km (15 mi) of Moscow. Thereafter, the Soviet Union physically transported and relocated east European industrial assets to the Soviet Union.

This was especially pronounced in eastern European Axis countries, such as Romania and Hungary, where such a policy was considered as punitive reparations (a principle accepted by Western powers). In some cases, Red Army officers viewed cities, villages and farms as being open to looting. Other Eastern Bloc states were required to provide coal, industrial equipment, technology, rolling stock and other resources to reconstruct the Soviet Union. Between 1945 and 1953, the Soviets received a net transfer of resources from the rest of the Eastern Bloc under this policy roughly comparable to the net transfer from the United States to western Europe in the Marshall Plan.

== East Germany ==
The red area of Germany (above) is Soviet controlled East Germany. The Soviets ceded the portion to the east of the Oder–Neisse line (light beige) to Poland, while a portion of the isolated easternmost section of German East Prussia, the Kaliningrad Oblast, was annexed directly into the USSR

Most of Germany east of the Oder–Neisse line, which contained much of Germany's fertile land, was transferred to what remained of unilaterally Soviet-controlled Poland. At the end of World War II, political opposition immediately materialised after occupying Soviet army personnel conducted systematic pillaging and rapes in their zone of then divided Germany, with total rape victim estimates ranging from tens of thousands to two million.

Factories, equipment, technicians, managers and skilled personnel were forcibly transferred to the Soviet Union. In the non-annexed remaining portion of Soviet-controlled East Germany, like in the rest of Soviet-controlled Eastern Europe, the major task of the ruling regime was to channel Soviet orders down to both the administrative apparatus and the other bloc parties pretending that these were initiatives of its own.

The SED won a first narrow election victory in Soviet-zone elections in 1946, even though Soviet authorities oppressed political opponents and prevented many competing parties from participating in rural areas. Property and industry were nationalised under their government. If statements or decisions deviated from the prescribed line, reprimands and, for persons outside public attention, punishment would ensue, such as imprisonment, torture and even death.

Indoctrination of Marxism–Leninism became a compulsory part of school curricula, sending professors and students fleeing to the west. Applicants for positions in the government, the judiciary and school systems had to pass ideological scrutiny. An elaborate political police apparatus kept the population under close surveillance, including Soviet SMERSH secret police. A tight system of censorship restricted access to print or the airwaves.

What remained of SED opposition parties were also infiltrated to exploit their relations with their "bourgeois" counterparts in western zones to support Soviet unity along Soviet lines, while a "National Democratic" party (NDPD) was created to attract former Nazis and professional military personnel in order to rally them behind the SED. In early 1948, during the Tito–Stalin split, the SED underwent a transformation into an authoritarian party dominated by functionaries subservient to Moscow. Important decisions had to be cleared with the CPSU Central Committee apparatus or even with Stalin himself.

By early 1949, the SED was capped by a Soviet-style Politburo that was effectively a small self-selecting inner circle. The German Democratic Republic was declared on 7 October 1949, within which the Soviet Ministry of Foreign Affairs accorded the East German state administrative authority, but not autonomy, with an unlimited Soviet exercise of the occupation regime and Soviet penetration of administrative, military and secret police structures.

== Poland ==
Eastern Poland (grey) was annexed directly into the USSR, while most of Germany east of the Oder–Neisse line (pink) was ceded to what remained of Poland (white), both of which would constitute the newly created People's Republic of Poland

After the Soviet invasion of German-occupied Poland in July 1944, Polish government-in-exile prime minister Stanisław Mikołajczyk flew to Moscow with Churchill to argue against the annexation of the Molotov–Ribbentrop Pact portion of eastern Poland by the Soviet Union. Poland served as the first real test of the American President Roosevelt's Soviet policy of "giving" to Stalin assuming noblesse oblige, with Roosevelt telling Mikołajczyk before the visit, "Don't worry. Stalin doesn't intend to take freedom from you" and after assuring U.S. backing, concluding "I shall see to it that your country does not come out of this war injured."

Mikołajczyk offered a smaller section of land, but Stalin declined, telling him that he would allow the exiled government to participate in the Polish Committee of National Liberation (PKWN and later "Lublin Committee"), which consisted of Communists and satellite parties set up under the direct control by the Soviet plenipotentiary Colonel-General Nikolai Bulganin. An agreement was reached at the Yalta Conference permitting the annexation of most of the Molotov–Ribbentrop Pact portion of Eastern Poland, while granting Poland part of East Germany in return. Thereafter, the Ukrainian Soviet Socialist Republic and the Byelorussian Soviet Socialist Republic were expanded to include eastern Poland.

The Soviet Union then compensated what remained of Poland by ceding to it the portion of Germany east of the Oder–Neisse line, which contained much of Germany's fertile land. An agreement was reached at Yalta that the Soviets' Provisional Government made up of PKWN members would be re-organised "on a broad democratic basis" including the exiled government, and that the re-organised government's primary task would be to prepare for elections.

Pretending that it was an indigenous body representing Polish society, the PKWN took the role of a governmental authority and challenged the pre–World War II Polish government-in-exile in London. Doubts began to arise whether the "free and unfettered elections" promised at the Yalta Conference would occur. Non-Stalinists and partisans, including those that fought the Nazis, were systematically persecuted. Hopes for a new free start were immediately dampened when the PKWN claimed they were entitled to choose who they wanted to take part in the government, and the Soviet NKVD seized sixteen Polish underground leaders who had wanted to participate in negotiations on the re-organisation in March 1945 brought them to the Soviet Union for a show trial in June.

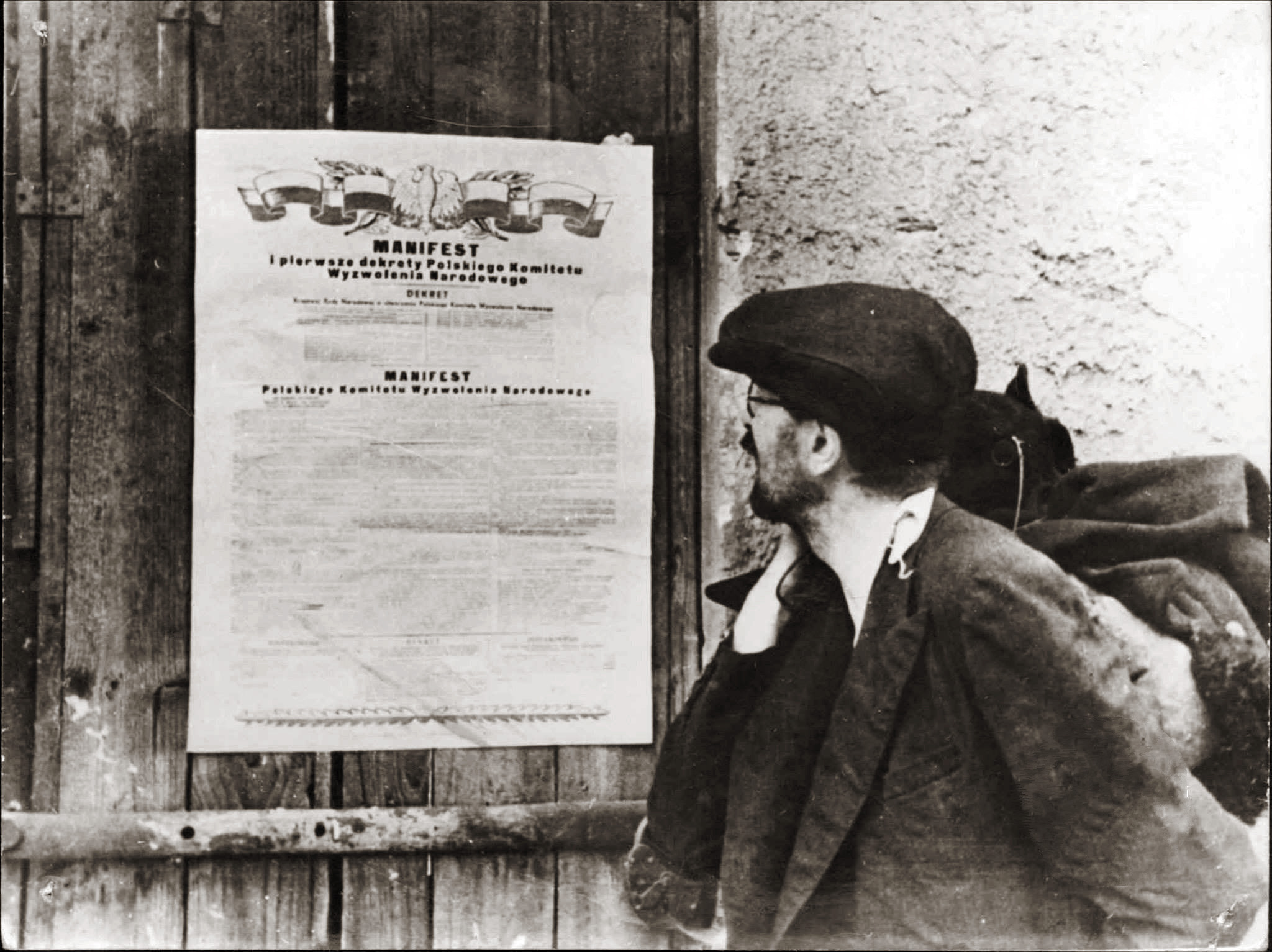
A propaganda photo of a citizen reading the PKWN Manifesto, issued on 22 July 1944

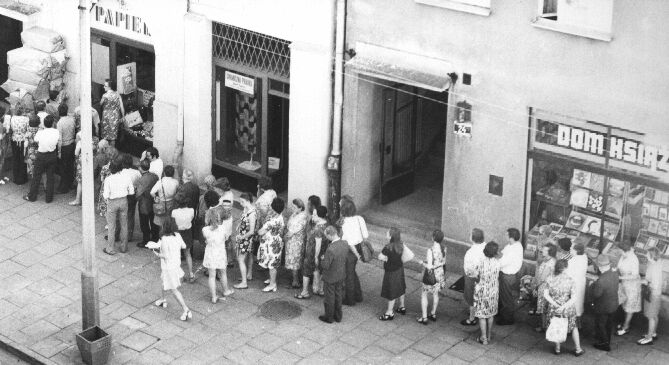
Line waiting to enter a store, a typical view in Poland in the 1950s and 1980s.

While underground leaders were sentenced to long prison terms, assurances that political prisoners would be released and that Soviet forces and security would leave failed to be supported by concrete safeguards or implementation plans. Polish government-in-exile figures, including Stanisław Mikołajczyk then returned to a popular reception, and were able to lure several parties to their cause, effectively undermining Bloc politics.

When the Mikołajczyk's People's Party (PSL) continued to resist pressure to renounce a ticket of its own outside the party bloc, it was exposed to open terror, including the disqualification of PSL candidates in one quarter of the districts and the arrest of over 80,000 PSL activists, followed by vote rigging that resulted in Gomułka's candidates winning a majority in the carefully controlled poll.

Mikołajczyk lost hope and left the country. His followers were subjected to unlimited ruthless persecution. Following the forged referendum, in October 1946, the new government nationalised all enterprises employing over 50 people and all but two banks. Public opposition had been essentially crushed by 1946, but underground activity still existed.

Fraudulent Polish elections held in January 1947 resulted in Poland's official transformation to a non-democratic Communist state by 1949, the People's Republic of Poland. Resistance fighters continued to battle Soviet forces in the Ukrainian annexed portions of eastern Poland, the Soviet response to which included the arrest of as many as 600,000 people between 1944 and 1952, with about one third executed and the rest imprisoned or exiled.

== Hungary ==
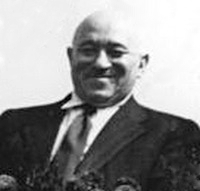
Mátyás Rákosi

After occupying Hungary, the Soviets imposed harsh conditions allowing it to seize important material assets and control internal affairs. During those occupations, an estimated 50,000 women and girls were raped. After the Red Army set up police organs to persecute class enemies, the Soviets assumed that the impoverished Hungarian populace would support Communists in coming elections.

The Communists were trounced, receiving only 17% of the vote, resulting in a coalition government under Prime Minister Zoltán Tildy. Soviet intervention, however, resulted in a government that disregarded Tildy, placed Communists in important ministries, and imposed restrictive and repressive measures, including banning the victorious Independent Smallholders, Agrarian Workers and Civic Party. Stalin's authoritarian regime repeatedly wrestled small concessions from opponents in a process named "salami tactics". Battling the initial postwar political majority in Hungary ready to establish a democracy, Mátyás Rákosi invented the term, which described his tactic slicing up enemies like pieces of salami.

In early 1947, the Soviets pressed Rákosi to take a "line of more pronounced class struggle." The People's Republic of Hungary was formed thereafter. At the height of his rule, Rákosi developed a strong cult of personality. Dubbed the “bald murderer,” Rákosi imitated Communist political and economic programs, resulting in Hungary experiencing one of the harshest dictatorships in Europe. He described himself as "Stalin's best Hungarian disciple" and "Stalin's best pupil." Repression was harsher in Hungary than in the other satellite countries in the 1940s and 1950s due to a more vehement Hungarian resistance.

Approximately 350,000 Hungarian officials and intellectuals were purged from 1948 to 1956. Thousands were arrested, tortured, tried, and imprisoned in concentration camps, deported to the east, or were executed, including ÁVH founder László Rajk. Gati describes "the most gruesome forms of psychological and physical torture...The reign of terror (by the Rákosi government) turned out to be harsher and more extensive than it was in any of the other Soviet satellites in Central and Eastern Europe."

== Bulgaria ==
On 5 September 1944, the Soviet Union declared war on Bulgaria claiming that Bulgaria was to be prevented from assisting Germany and allowing the Wehrmacht to use its territory. On 8 September 1944, the Red Army crossed the border and created the conditions for the coup d'état the following night. The government was taken over by the "Fatherland Front" where the Communists played a leading role and an armistice followed. The Soviet military commander in Sofia assumed supreme authority, and the Communists and their allies in the Fatherland Front whom he instructed, including Kimon Georgiev, took full control of domestic politics. An armed resistance guerilla movement, known as the Goryani Movement, began immediately after Soviet occupation in 1944 and lasted until the late 1950s. It is known to be the longest as well as the first anti-Soviet armed resistance in the Eastern Bloc. The movement eventually subsided following the quelling of the 1956 uprising in Budapest, which lead to the realisation that no help would come from Western powers.

On 8 September 1946, a national plebiscite was organised in which 96% of all votes (91% of the population voted) for the abolition of the monarchy and the installation of a republic. In October 1946 elections, persecution against opposition parties occurred, such as jailing members of the previous government, periodic newspaper publication bans and subjecting opposition followers to frequent attacks by Communist armed groups. Thereafter, the People's Republic of Bulgaria was formed and Vasil Kolarov was appointed by the Parliament as a President (chairman) of the Republic though in fact Georgi Dimitrov, who took the post of a prime-minister, became the first man in power of the newly formed republic. The nine-year-old king Simeon II of Sax-Cobourg-Gotta was sent to exile accompanied by his mother the Queen Jovana of Savoy and his sister princess Maria-Louisa.

On 6 June 1947, parliamentary leader Nikola Petkov, a critic of Soviet rule, was arrested in the Parliament building, subjected to a show trial, found guilty of espionage, sentenced to death, and hanged on 23 September 1947. The Bulgarian secret police arranged for the publication of a false Petkov confession. The confession's false nature was so obvious that it became an embarrassment and the authorities ceased mentioning it.

== Czechoslovakia ==
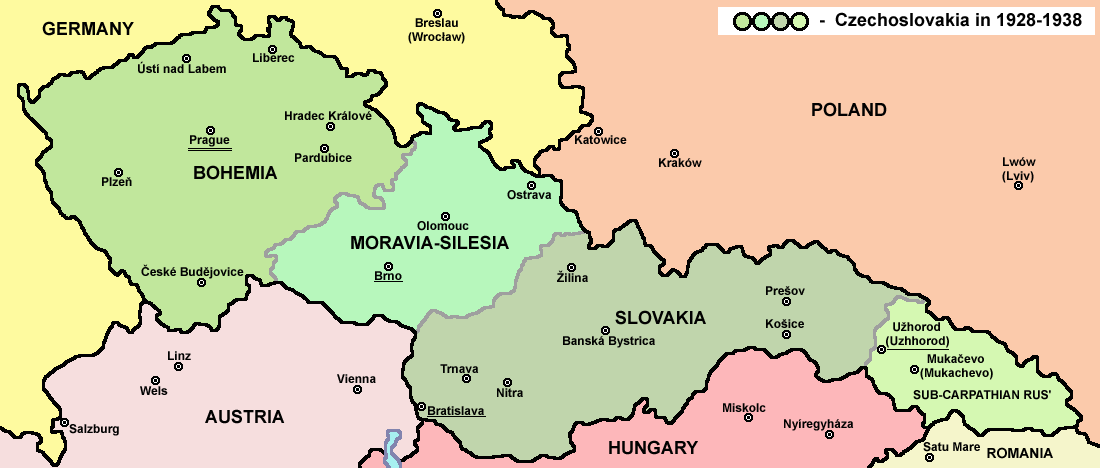
Easternmost Czechoslovakia, Carpathian Ruthenia (light green) was annexed directly into the Soviet Union, while the rest of the country would become the Czechoslovak Socialist Republic

In 1943, Czechoslovak leader in exile Edvard Beneš agreed to Stalin's demands for unconditional agreement with Soviet foreign policy, including the expulsion of over one million Sudeten ethnic Germans identified as "rich people" and ethnic Hungarians, directed by the Beneš decrees. Beneš promised Stalin a "close postwar collaboration" in military and economic affairs, including confiscation and nationalisation of large landowners' property, factories, mines, steelworks and banks under a Czechoslovak "national road to socialism". While Beneš was not a Moscow cadre and several domestic reforms of other Eastern Bloc countries were not part Beneš' plan, Stalin did not object because the plan included property expropriation and he was satisfied with the relative strength of Communists in Czechoslovakia compared to other Eastern Bloc countries.

Beneš traveled to Moscow in March 1945. After answering a list of questions by the Soviet NKVD, Beneš pleased Moscow with his plans to deport two million ethnic Sudeten Germans and 400,000 to 600,000 Hungarians, and to build a strong army that would closely coordinate with the Red Army. In April 1945, the Third Republic, a national front coalition ruled by three socialist parties, was formed. Because of the Soviet Union's strength (they held 114 of 300 seats) and Beneš' loyalty, unlike in other Eastern Bloc countries, the Kremlin did not require Bloc politics or "reliable" cadres in Czechoslovak power positions, and the executive and legislative branches retained their traditional structures.

However, the Soviet Union was, at first, disappointed that their party did not take advantage of their position after receiving the most votes in 1946 elections. While they had deprived the traditional administration of major functions by transferring local and regional government to newly established committees in which they largely dominated, they failed to eliminate "bourgeois" influence in the army or to expropriate industrialists and large landowners.

The existence of a somewhat independent political structure and Czechoslovakia's initial absence of stereotypical Eastern Bloc political and socioeconomic systems began to be seen as problematic by Soviet authorities. While parties outside the "National Front" were excluded from the government, they were still allowed to exist. In contrast to countries occupied by the Red Army, there were no Soviet occupation authorities in Czechoslovakia upon whom the Soviet Union could rely to assert a leading role.

Hope in Moscow was waning for a victory in the upcoming 1948 elections. A May 1947 Kremlin report concluded that "reactionary elements" praising western democracy had strengthened. Following Czechoslovakia's brief consideration of taking Marshall Plan funds, and the subsequent scolding of their parties by the Cominform at Szklarska Poręba in September 1947, Rudolf Slánský returned to Prague with a plan for the final seizure of power, including the StB's elimination of party enemies and purging of dissidents.

== Romania ==
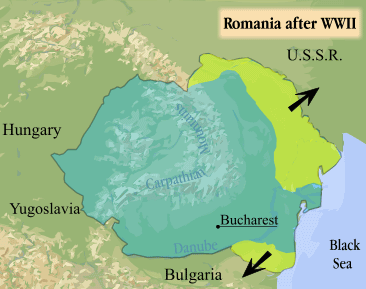
The northern light green area was annexed into the USSR as the Moldavian Soviet Socialist Republic and Ukrainian Soviet Socialist Republic's Chernivtsi Oblast and Izmail oblast. The dark green area comprises what remained as the People's Republic of Romania.

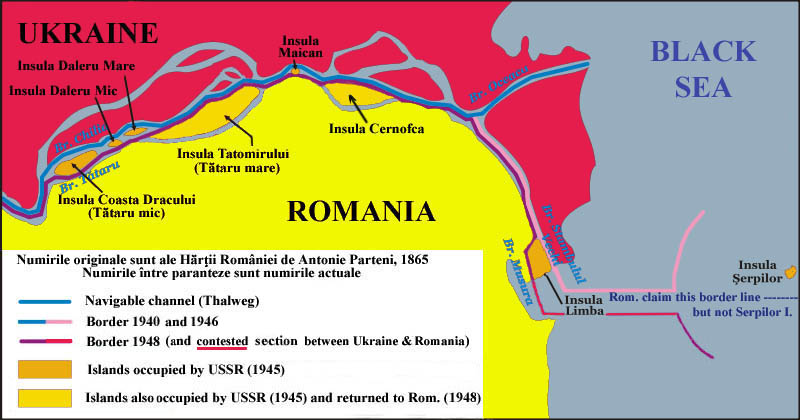
In the late 1940s a number of islands in the Danube Delta and Snake Island were annexed by the Soviet Union into the Ukrainian SSR

As the Red Army battled the Wehrmacht and Romanian forces in August 1944, Soviet agent Emil Bodnăraș organised an underground coalition to stage a coup d'état that would put Communists—who were then two tiny groups—into power. However, King Michael had already organised a coup, in which Bodnăraş also had participated, putting Michael in power. After Soviet invasions following two years of Romania fighting with the Axis, at the February 1945 Yalta Conference and the July 1945 Potsdam Conference, the western allies agreed to the Soviet absorption of the areas.

Michael accepted the Soviets' armistice terms, which included military occupation along with the annexation of Northern Romania. The Soviets' 1940 annexation of Bessarabia and part of Northern Bukovina to create the important agricultural region of the Moldavian Soviet Socialist Republic (while other Romanian territories were converted into the Chernivtsi Oblast and Izmail Oblast of the Ukrainian SSR) became a point of tension between Romania and the Soviet Union, especially after 1965. The Yalta Conference also had granted the Soviet Union a predominant interest in what remained of Romania, which coincided with the Soviet occupation of Romania.

The Soviets organised the National Democratic Front, which was composed of several parties including the Ploughmen's Front. It became increasingly Soviet dominated. In February 1945, Soviet proponents provoked a crisis to exploit support by the Soviet occupation power for enforcement of unlimited control. In March 1945, Stalin aide Andre Vyshinskii traveled to Bucharest and installed a government that included only members subservient to the National Front.

This included Ploughmen's Front member Dr. Petru Groza, who became prime minister. Groza installed a government that included many parties, though Communists held the key ministries. The potential of army resistance was neutralised by the removal of major troop leaders and the inclusion of two divisions staffed with ideologically trained prisoners of war. Bodnăraş was appointed General Secretary and initiated re-organisation of the general police and secret police.

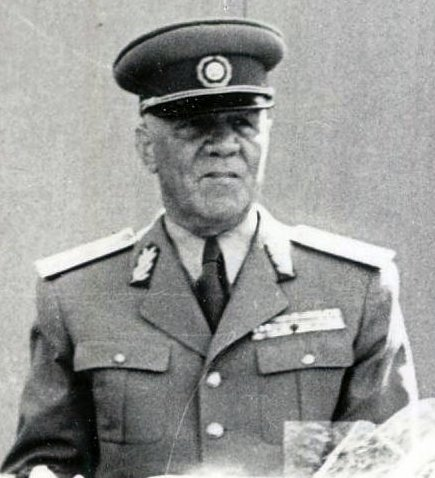
Emil Bodnăraș

Over western allies' objections, traditional parties were excluded from government and subjected to intensifying persecution. Political persecution of local leaders and strict radio and press control were designed to prepare for an eventual unlimited Communist totalitarianism, including the liquidation of opposition. When King Michael attempted to force Groza's resignation by refusing to sign any legislation ("the royal strike"), Groza enacted laws without Michael's signature.

In early 1947, Bodnăraş reported that Romanian leaders Gheorghiu-Dej and Maurer were seeking to bolster the Romanian economy by developing relations with Britain and the United States and were complaining about Soviet occupying troops. Thereafter, the PCR eliminated the role of the centrist parties, including a show trial of National Peasants' Party leaders, and forced other parties to merge with the PCR. By 1947, most non-Communist politicians were either executed, in exile or in prison. In December, Groza and Gheorghiu-Dej forced Michael to abdicate at gunpoint, and hours later the Communist-dominated legislature proclaimed Romania a "People's Republic."

Following Gheorghiu-Dej's death in 1965, Nicolae Ceaușescu became General Secretary of the Romanian Communist Party. He changed the name of the country to the Socialist Republic of Romania, and ruled one of the most (by some accounts, the most) brutal states in the Eastern bloc for nearly 25 years.

== Albania ==
On 29 December 1944, the National Liberation Movement drove the German occupiers out of Tirana. The LNC, as it was popularly called, was dominated by the two-year-old Albanian Communist Party, led by Enver Hoxha. From this day onward, unlike the other countries in what became the Eastern Bloc, Albania was an out-and-out Communist dictatorship. The LNC wasted little time eliminating almost all potential opposition and isolating the country from the non-Communist world. It swiftly took control of the police, the court system and the economy, while eliminating several hundred political opponents through a series of show trials conducted by judges without legal training.

In December 1945, elections for the Albanian People's Assembly were held. However, voters only had the choice of approving or rejecting a single list from the Democratic Front (Albania), the successor to the LNC. In 1946, Albania was declared the People's Republic of Albania and, thereafter, it broke relations with the United States and refused to participate in the 1947 Marshall Plan.

== Yugoslavia ==
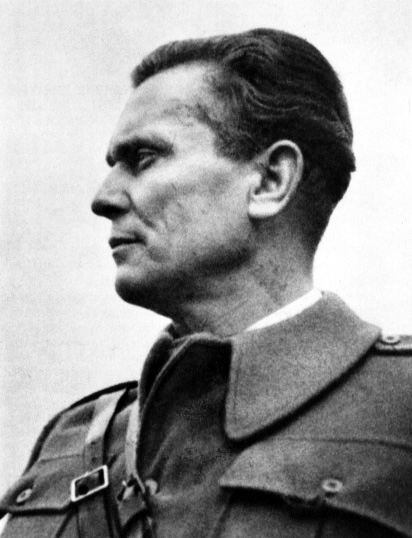
Josip Broz Tito

Yugoslavia, the second-largest of the post-war countries, and the sole Communist state with open access to the Mediterranean, was only aligned with the Soviet Union for 3 post-war years (1945–1948). Its leader, Josip Broz Tito, broke with the Soviets with the Tito–Stalin split of 1948. The country subsequently came under threat of invasion by the Warsaw Pact, with the Yugoslav People's Army planning defenses against both Eastern and Western Bloc attacks. Throughout the Cold War period, the country steered an independent course, founding the Non-Aligned Movement in collaboration with Ghana, Egypt and India.

At the end of World War II, Yugoslavia was considered a victor power and had neither an occupation force nor an allied control commission. Communism was considered a popular alternative to the west, in part because of the popularity of the Yugoslav Partisans during World War II and opposition to former royalist Chetnik leader Draža Mihailović and King Peter. A cabinet for the new Democratic Federal Yugoslavia was formed, with 25 of the 28 members being former Communist Yugoslav Partisans led by Josip Broz Tito. The League of Communists of Yugoslavia formed the National Front of Yugoslavia coalition, with opposition members boycotting the first election because it presented only a single government list which could be accepted or rejected, without opponents. Censorship, denial of publication allocations and open intimidation of opposition groups followed. Three weeks after the election, the Front declared that a new Republic would be formed, with a new constitution put in place two months later in January 1946 initiating the Federal People's Republic of Yugoslavia. The Communists continued a campaign against enemies, including arresting Mihailović, conducting a controversial trial and then executing him, followed by several other opposition arrests and trials. Thereafter, a pro-Soviet phase continued until the Tito–Stalin split of 1948 and the subsequent formation of the Non-Aligned Movement.
