= Western world =

Countries with an originally European shared culture

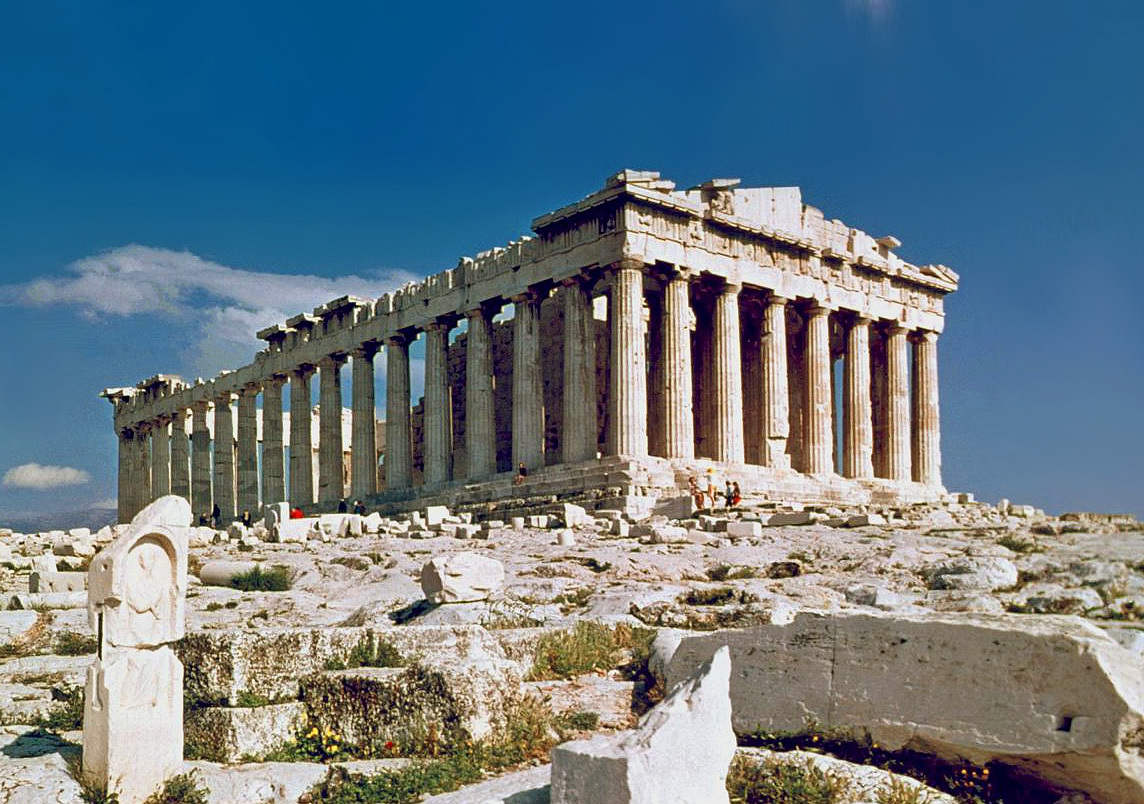
The Parthenon in Athens

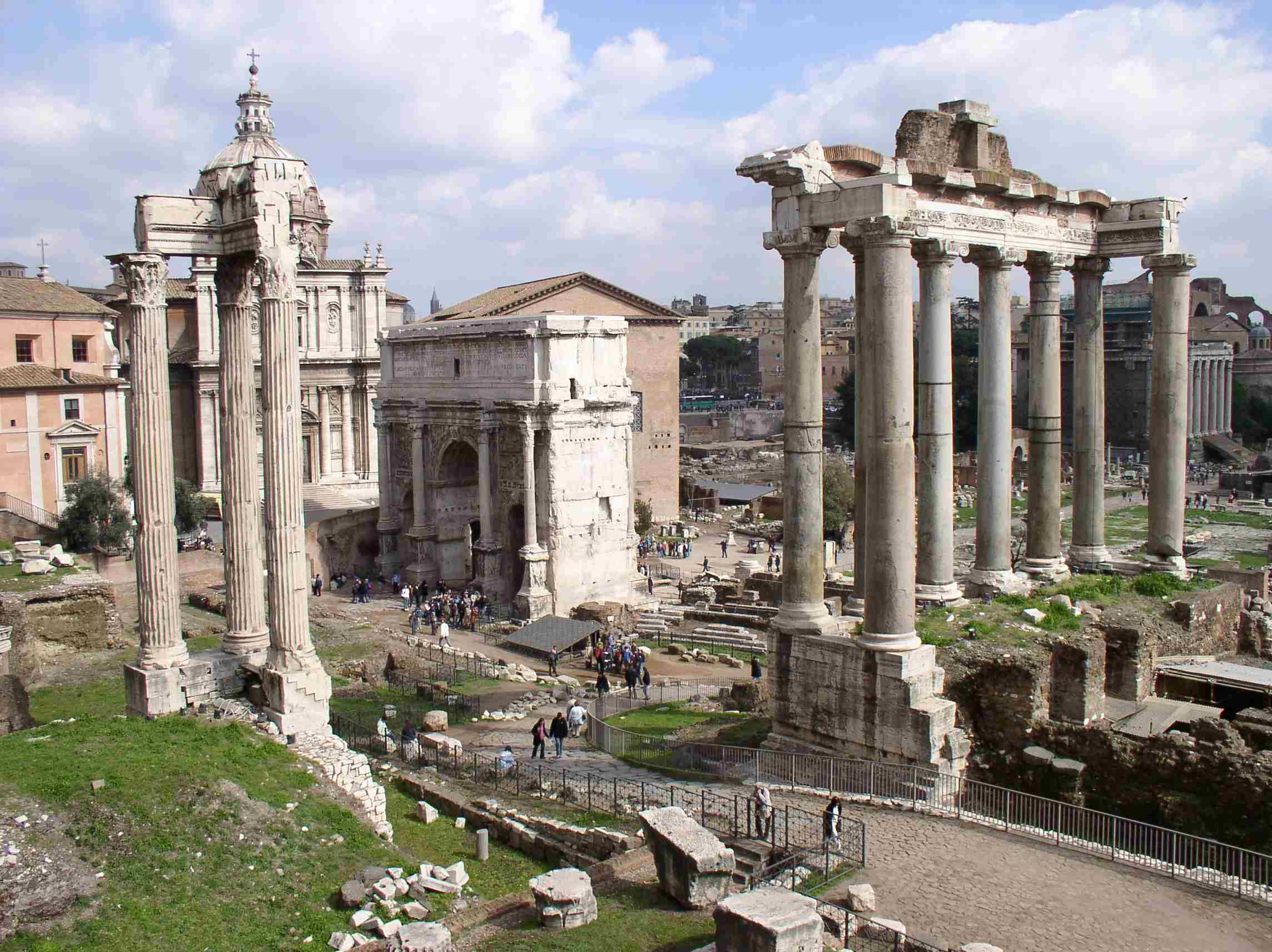
The Roman Forum in Rome

Ancient Greco-Roman world forms the foundation of the modern Western world

The Western world, also known as the West, primarily refers to various nations and states in Europe, the Americas, and Australasia. The Western world likewise is called the Occident (from Latin occidens 'setting down, sunset, west') in contrast to the Eastern world known as the Orient (from Latin oriens 'origin, sunrise, east'). Definitions of the 'Western world' vary according to context and perspectives; the West is an evolving concept made up of cultural, political, and economic synergy among diverse groups of people, and not a rigid region with fixed borders and members.

Ancient Greece and Rome are widely regarded as the birthplaces of Western civilization. A geographical concept of the West started to take shape in the 4th century CE when Constantine, the first Christian Roman emperor, divided the Roman Empire between the Greek East and Latin West. The Eastern Roman Empire, later called the Byzantine Empire, continued for a millennium, while the Western Roman Empire lasted for only about a century and a half. Significant theological and ecclesiastical differences led Western Europeans to consider the Christians in the Byzantine Empire as heretics. In 1054 CE, when the church in Rome excommunicated the patriarch of Byzantium, the politico-religious division between the Western church and Eastern church culminated in the Great Schism or the East–West Schism. Even though friendly relations continued between the two parts of Christendom for some time, the crusades made the schism definitive with hostility. The West during these crusades tried to capture trade routes to the East and failed; it instead 'discovered' the Americas. In the aftermath of the European colonization of the Americas, primarily conducted by Western European powers, there emerged an idea of the "Western" world, as an inheritor of Latin Christendom. According to the Oxford English Dictionary, the earliest reference to the term 'Western world' is from 1586, found in the writings of William Warner.

The countries that are considered constituents of the West vary according to perspective rather than their geographical location. Countries like Australia and New Zealand, located in the Eastern Hemisphere, are included in modern definitions of the Western world, as these regions and others like them have been significantly influenced by the British—derived from colonization, and immigration of Europeans—factors that grounded such countries to the West. Depending on the context and the historical period in question, Russia has sometimes been seen as a part of the West, and at other times juxtaposed with it, as well as endorsing anti-Western sentiment.

In the New World, the United States became more prominently featured in the conceptualizations of the West as it rose as a great power, amidst the development of communication–transportation technologies like the telegraph and railroads 'shrinking' the distance between both the Atlantic Ocean shores. Additionally, even though the various national cultures of Latin America share a common Western cultural basis—derived from colonization, and immigration of Europeans—originating in Spain and Portugal, there was debate among some in the 1960s as to whether Latin America as a whole is in a category of its own. This is mostly due to the various cultural influences that Latin American cultures have received from Indigenous peoples of the Americas, as well as African peoples, not unlike other postcolonial cultures from the Americas, such as the United States and Canada, whose cultures have also been substantially influenced by people from outside of Europe, and which are nonetheless still usually grouped as a part of Western Civilization.

At some times between the 18th century and the mid-20th century, prominent countries in the West, such as the United States, Canada, Australia, and New Zealand, have been envisioned by some as ethnocracies for White people. Racism is claimed as a contributing factor to Western European colonization of the New World, which today constitutes much of the geographical Western world-split between Global North and Global South. Starting from the late 1960s, certain parts of the Western world have become notable for their diversity due to immigration and changes in fertility rates.

In sum: the idea of 'the West' over the course of time has evolved from a directional concept to a socio-political concept, temporalized and rendered as a concept of the future bestowed with notions of progress and modernity.

== Introduction ==
The origins of Western civilization can be traced back to the ancient Mediterranean world. Ancient Greece (Note: See See) and Ancient Rome (Note: See) are generally considered to be the birthplaces of Western civilization—Greece having heavily influenced Rome—the former due to its impact on philosophy, democracy, science, aesthetics, as well as building designs and proportions and architecture; the latter due to its influence on art, law, warfare, governance, republicanism, engineering and religion. Western Civilization is also closely associated with Christianity, the dominant religion in the West, with roots in Greco-Roman and Jewish thought. Christian ethics, drawing from the ethical and moral principles of its historical roots in Judaism, has played a pivotal role in shaping the foundational framework of Western societies. Earlier civilizations, such as the ancient Egyptians and Mesopotamians, had also significantly influenced Western civilization through their advancements in writing, law codes, and societal structures. The convergence of Greek-Roman and Judeo-Christian influences in shaping Western civilization has led certain scholars to characterize it as emerging from the legacies of Athens and Jerusalem, or Athens, Jerusalem and Rome.

In ancient Greece and Rome, individuals identified primarily as subjects of states, city-states, or empires, rather than as members of Western civilization. The distinct identification of Western civilization began to crystallize with the rise of Christianity during the Late Roman Empire. In this period, peoples in Europe started to perceive themselves as part of a unique civilization, differentiating from others like Islam, giving rise to the concept of Western civilization. By the 15th century, Renaissance intellectuals solidified this concept, associating Western civilization not only with Christianity but also with the intellectual and political achievements of the ancient Greeks and Romans.

Historians, such as Carroll Quigley in "The Evolution of Civilizations", contend that Western civilization was born around AD 500, after the fall of the Western Roman Empire, leaving a vacuum for new ideas to flourish that were impossible in Classical societies. In either view, between the fall of the Western Roman Empire and the Renaissance, the West (or those regions that would later become the heartland of the culturally "western sphere") experienced a period of decline, and then readaptation, reorientation and considerable renewed material, technological and political development. Classical culture of the ancient Western world was partly preserved during this period due to the survival of the Eastern Roman Empire and the introduction of the Catholic Church; it was also greatly expanded by the Arab importation of both the Ancient Greco-Roman and new technology through the Arabs from India and China to Europe.

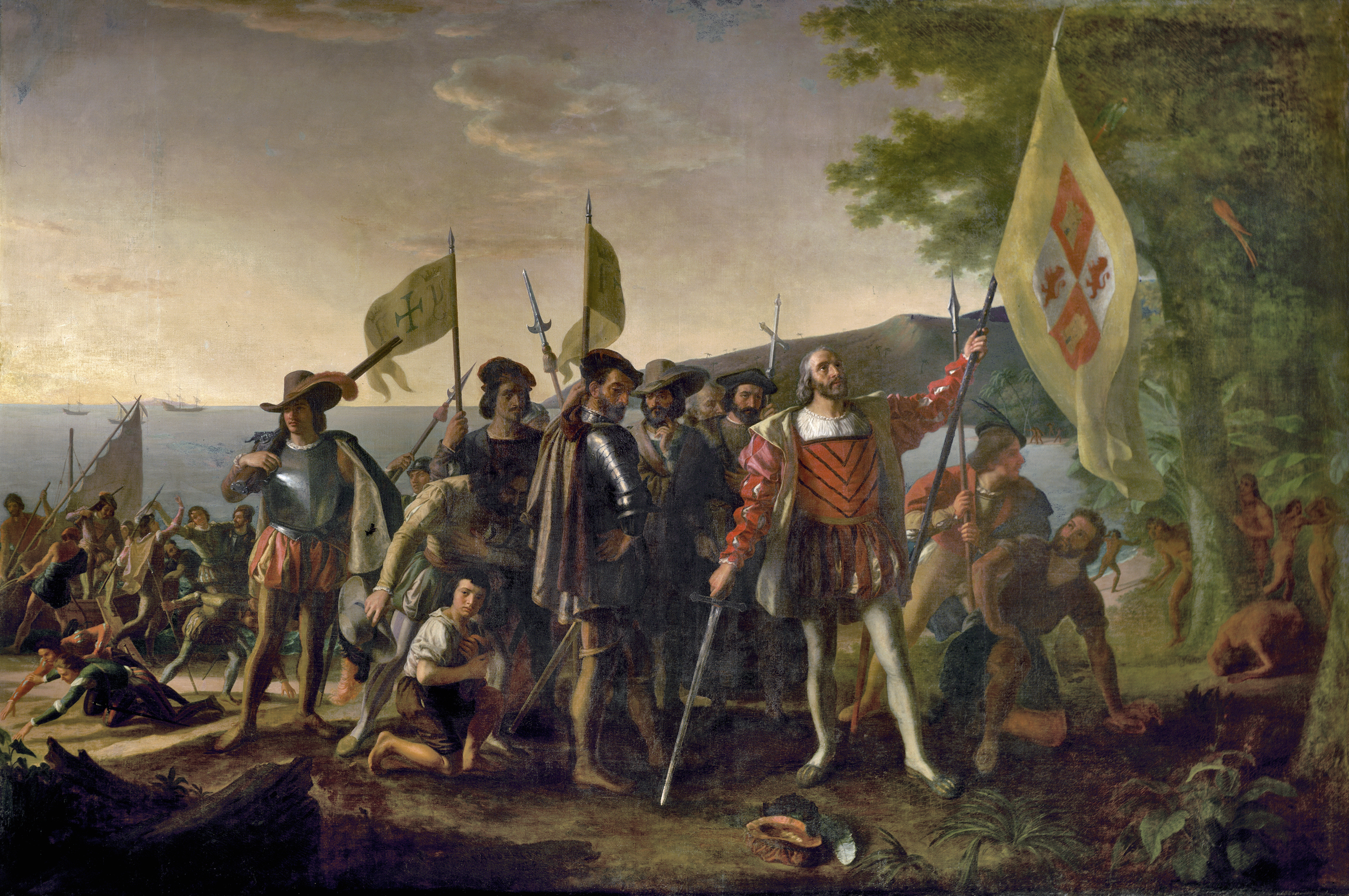
Christopher Columbus arrives at the New World.

Since the Renaissance, the West evolved beyond the influence of the ancient Greeks and Romans and the Islamic world, due to the successful Second Agricultural, Commercial, Scientific, and Industrial revolutions (propellers of modern banking concepts). The West rose further with the 18th century's Age of Enlightenment and through the Age of Exploration's expansion of peoples of European empires in the 18th and 19th centuries, particularly the globe-spanning colonial empires of Western Europe. Numerous times, this expansion was accompanied by Catholic missionaries, who attempted to proselytize Christianity.

In the modern era, Western culture has undergone further transformation through the Renaissance, Ages of Discovery and Enlightenment, and the Industrial and Scientific Revolutions. The widespread influence of Western culture extended globally through imperialism, colonialism, and Christianization by Western powers from the 15th to 20th centuries. This influence persists through the exportation of mass culture, a phenomenon often referred to as Westernization.

== Culture ==
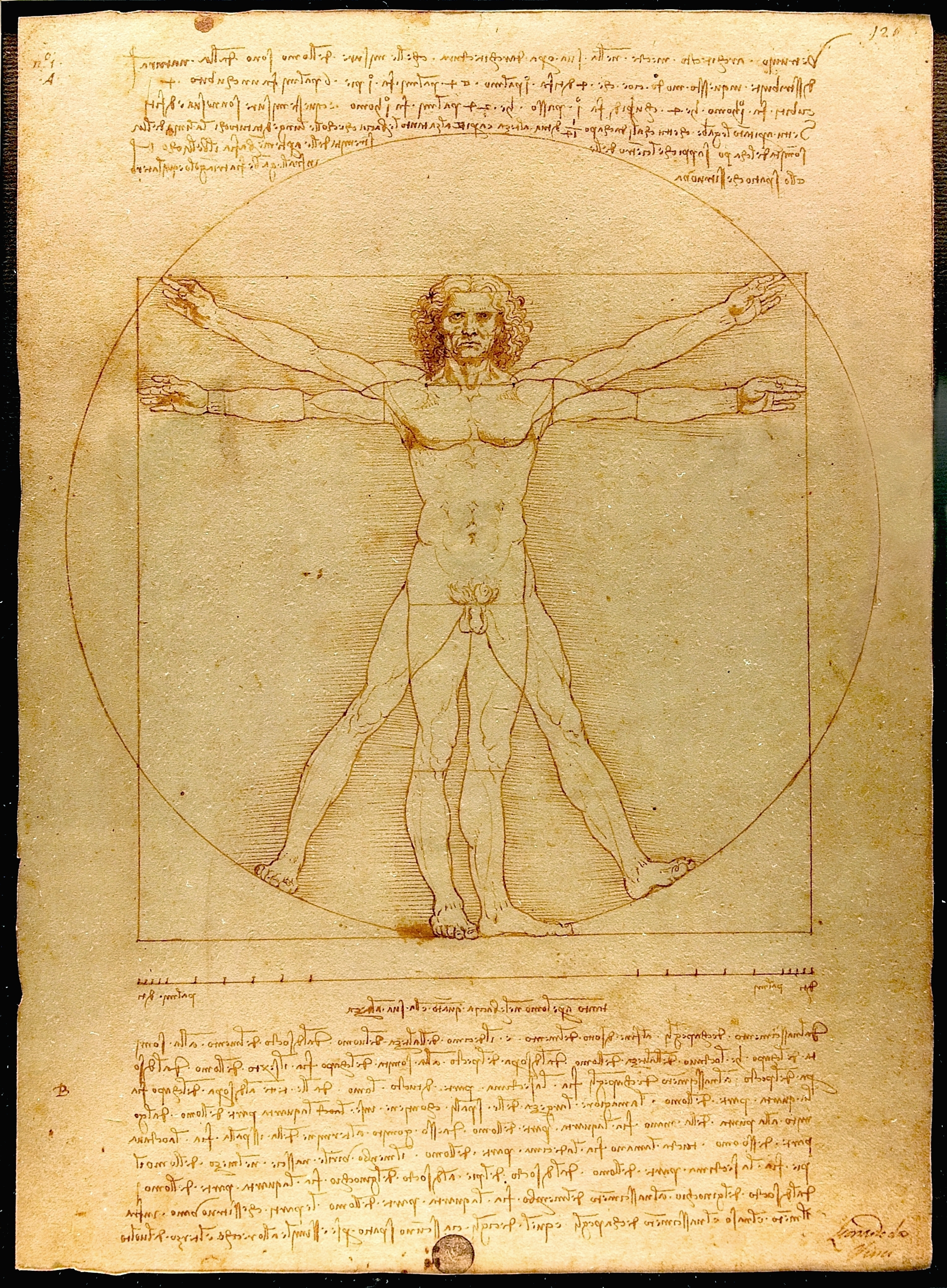
Leonardo da Vinci's Vitruvian Man, based on the correlations of ideal human proportions with geometry described by the ancient Roman architect Vitruvius in Book III of his treatise De architectura.

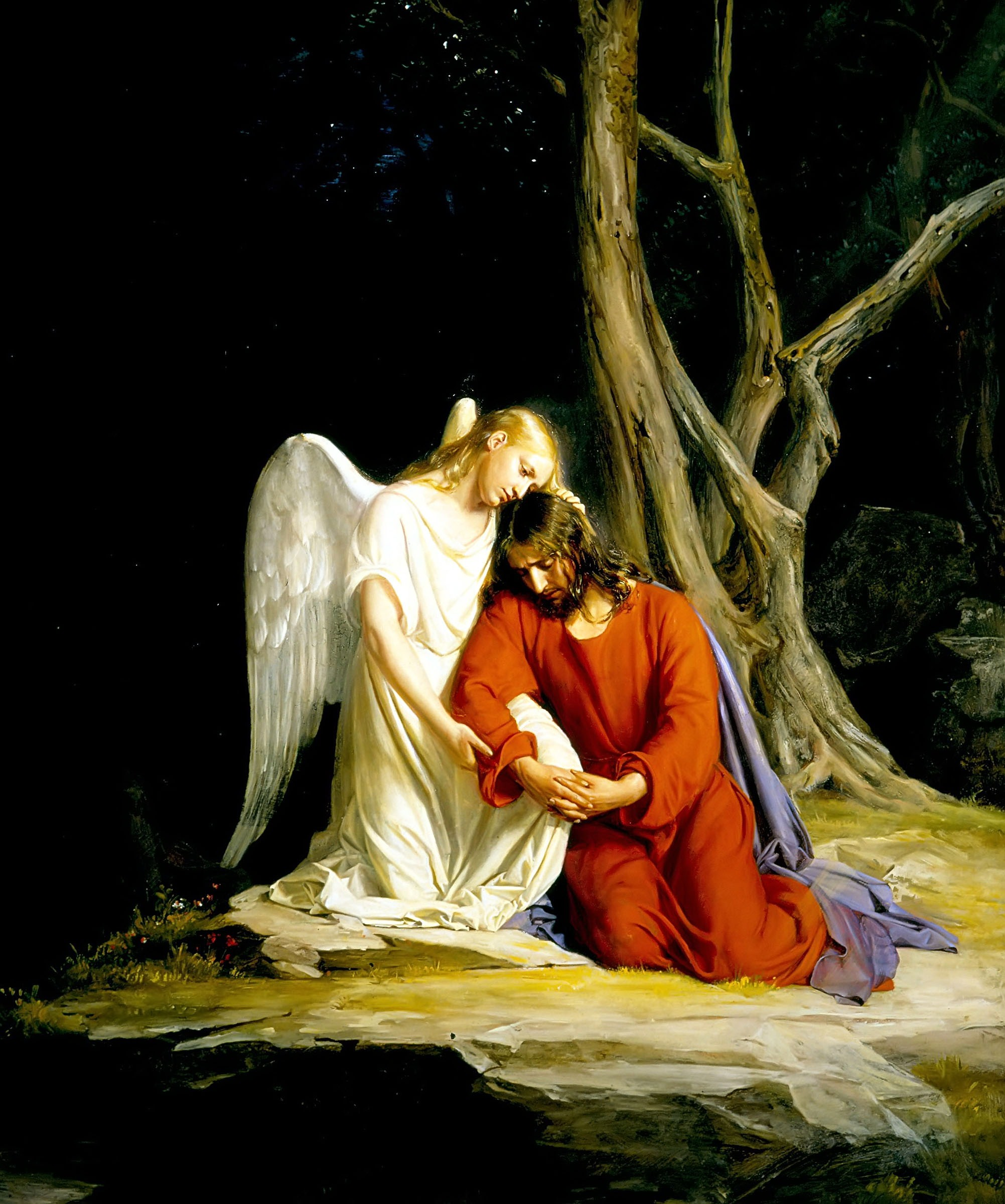
Kristus i Getsemane (1873), an angel comforting Jesus Christ before his arrest in the Garden of Gethsemane, by Carl Heinrich Bloch.

Western culture, also known as Western civilization, European civilization, Occidental culture, Western society or simply the West, is the externally cohesive yet internally diverse culture and cultural heritage of the Western world. The term "Western" encompasses the social norms, ethical values, traditional customs, belief systems, political systems, artifacts and technologies primarily rooted in European and Mediterranean histories. A broad concept, "Western culture" does not relate to a region with fixed members or geographical confines. It generally refers to the classical era cultures of ancient Greece, ancient Rome, and their Christian successors that expanded across the Mediterranean basin and Europe, and later circulated around the world predominantly through colonization and globalization.

The phrase “Western civilization” appears to have become common by the late 1800s. One study notes that it was being used without special explanation by at least 1890, while earlier 19th century English-language writers generally talked about “European civilization”. Previously, "Christendom" was the only widely used umbrella concept for centuries. Historically, scholars have closely associated the idea of Western culture with the classical era of Greco-Roman antiquity. However, scholars also acknowledge that other cultures, like ancient Egypt, the Phoenician city-states, and several Near-Eastern cultures stimulated and influenced it. The Hellenistic period also promoted syncretism, blending Greek, Roman, and Near-Eastern cultures. Major advances in literature, engineering, and science shaped the Hellenistic Jewish culture, from which the earliest Christians and the Greek New Testament emerged. The eventual Christianization of Europe in late antiquity would ensure that Christianity, particularly the Catholic Church, remained a dominant force in Western culture for many centuries to follow.

The Early Middle Ages, after the fall of the Western Roman Empire, were characterized by depopulation, deurbanization, and the collapse of long-distance trade, as Europe suffered hundreds of years of raids and invasions from Vikings, Muslims, and Magyars from the north, south and east. Following that long period of war and instability, however, medieval Europe experienced gradual improvements, including several medieval renaissances. 12th-century Latin translations brought ancient Greek and Roman texts back to central and western Europe from the Islamic world and helped medieval scholasticism to grow and thrive. Medieval Christianity is credited with creating the modern university, the modern hospital system, scientific economics, and natural law (which would later influence the creation of international law). During the Renaissance, the rise of humanism, the spread of the movable type printing press, the encounter with the Americas and the advance of the Reformation each transformed European culture.

The Scientific Revolution and the Enlightenment of the 17th and 18th centuries advanced ideals of empirical inquiry, political pluralism and individual rights. These ideas influenced revolutions across Europe and the Americas, spurred the development of modern democratic institutions and, together with the Industrial Revolution, transformed Western society. In the 19th and 20th centuries, the influence of Enlightenment rationalism continued with the rise of secularism and liberal democracy, while the Industrial Revolution fueled economic and technological growth. The expansion of civil rights and the decline of religious authority marked significant cultural shifts. Tendencies that have come to define modern Western societies include the concept of political pluralism, individualism, prominent subcultures or countercultures, and increasing cultural syncretism resulting from globalization and immigration.

== Historical divisions ==
=== The west of the Mediterranean region during antiquity ===
The geopolitical divisions in Europe that created a concept of East and West originated in the ancient tyrannical and imperialistic Graeco-Roman times. The Eastern Mediterranean was home to the highly urbanized cultures that had Greek as their common language (owing to the older empire of Alexander the Great and of the Hellenistic successors), whereas the West was much more rural in its character and more readily adopted Latin as its common language. After the fall of the Western Roman Empire, the linguistic and cultural distinction between a predominantly Latin West and Greek East persisted; Byzantine missionary activity later transmitted Eastern Christianity and Graeco-Roman cultural forms to many Slavic peoples.

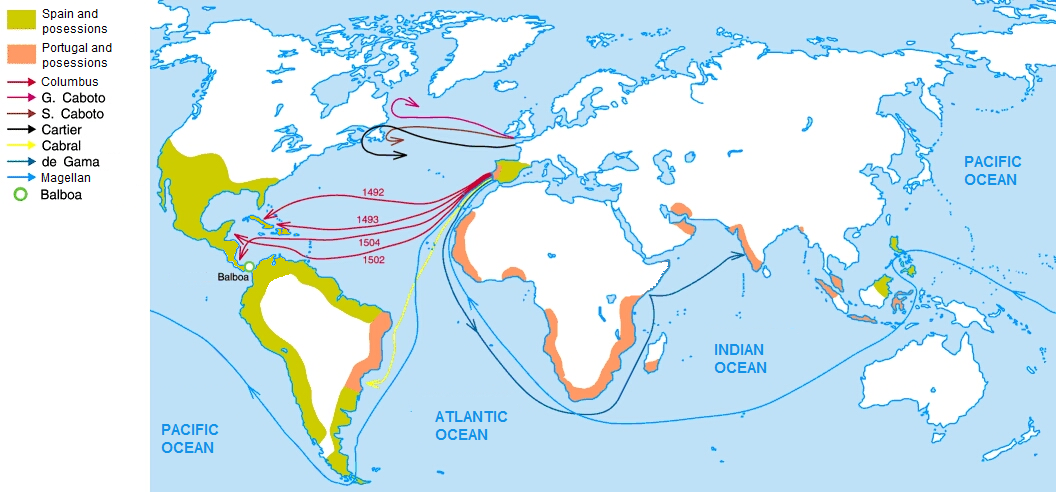
The main travels of the Age of Discovery (began in 15th century)

Roman Catholic Western and Central Europe thus maintained a distinct identity, particularly as it began to redevelop during the Renaissance. Even following the Protestant Reformation, Protestant Europe continued to see itself as more tied to Roman Catholic Europe than other parts of the perceived "civilized world". Use of the term West as a specific cultural and geopolitical term developed over the course of the Age of Exploration as Europe spread its culture to other parts of the world. Roman Catholics were the first major religious group to migrate to the New World, as settlers in the colonies of Spain and Portugal (and later, France) belonged to that faith. English and Dutch colonies, on the other hand, tended to be more religiously diverse. Settlers to these colonies included Anglicans, Dutch Calvinists, English Puritans and other nonconformists, English Catholics, Scottish Presbyterians, French Huguenots, German and Swedish Lutherans, as well as Quakers, Mennonites, Amish, and Moravians.

==== Ancient Roman world (6th century BC – AD 395–476) ====
The Roman Republic in 218 BC after having managed the conquest of most of the Italian Peninsula, on the eve of its most successful and deadliest war with the Carthaginians

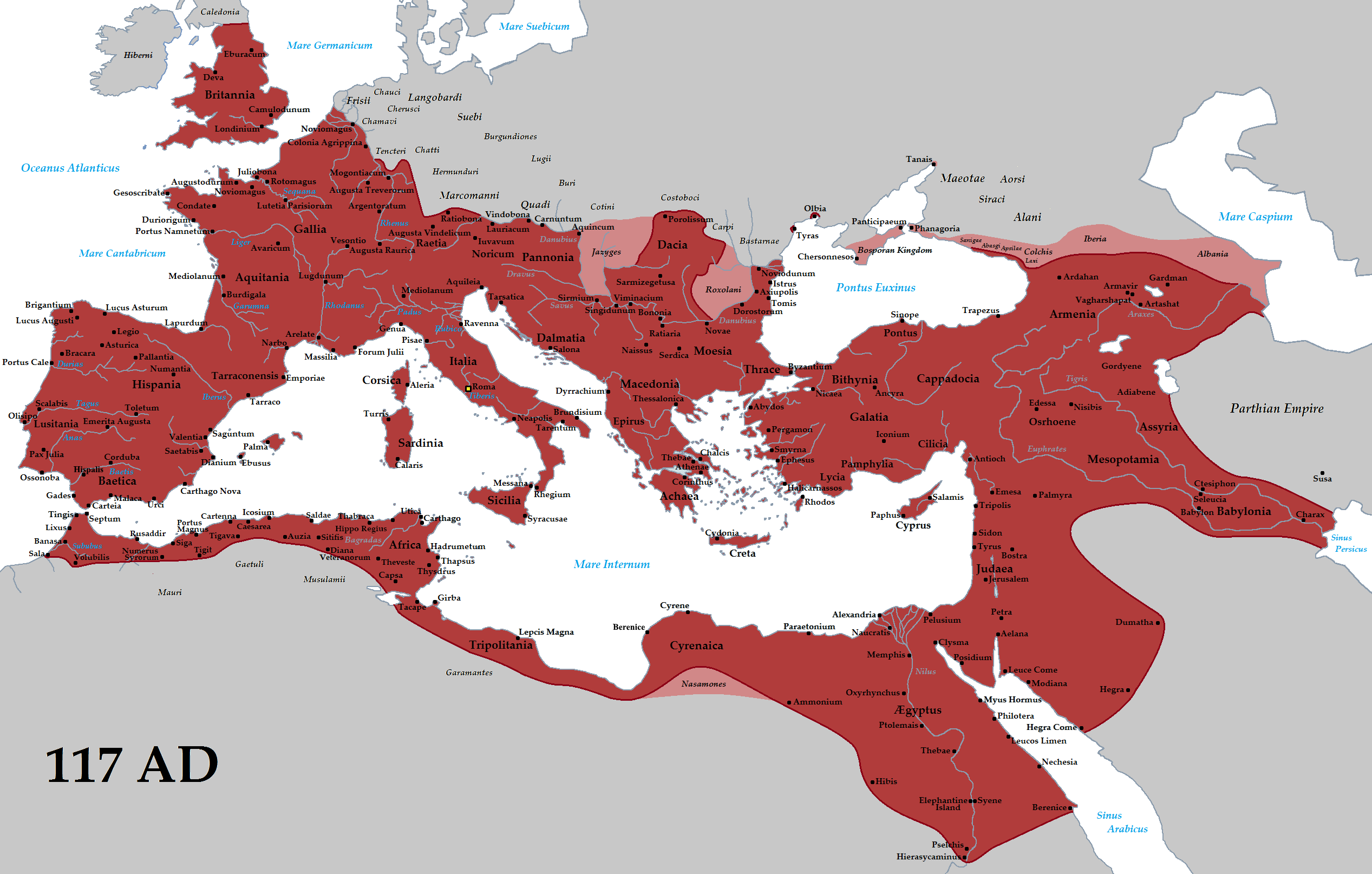
The Roman Empire in AD 117. During 350 years the Roman Republic turned into an Empire expanding up to twenty-five times its area.

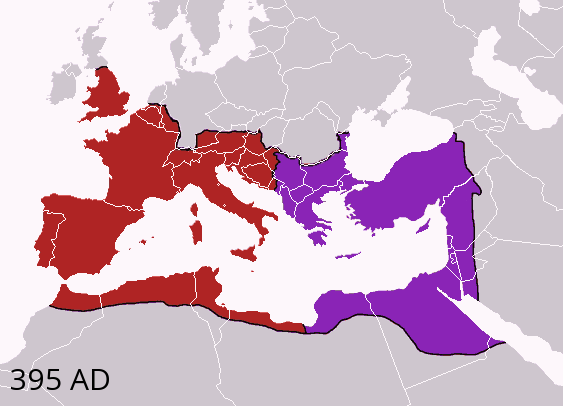
Map of the Western and Eastern Roman Empire at the death of the last emperor to rule both halves.

Ancient Rome (6th century BC – AD 476) is a term to describe the ancient Roman society that conquered Central Italy assimilating the Italian Etruscan culture, growing from the Latium region since about the 8th century BC, to a massive empire straddling the Mediterranean Sea. In its 10-centuries territorial expansion, Roman civilization shifted from a small monarchy (753–509 BC), to a republic (509–27 BC), into an autocratic empire (27 BC – AD 476). Its Empire came to dominate Western, Central and Southeastern Europe, Northern Africa and, becoming an autocratic Empire a vast Middle Eastern area, when it ended. Conquest was enforced using the Roman legions and then through cultural assimilation by eventual recognition of some form of Roman citizenship's privileges. Nonetheless, despite its great legacy, a combination of political instability, civil war, fiscal and military pressures, and external invasions contributed to the long decline and eventual fall of the Western Roman Empire.

The Roman Empire succeeded the approximately 500-year-old Roman Republic (c. 510–30 BC). In 350 years, from the successful and deadliest war with the Phoenicians which began in 218 BC to the rule of Emperor Hadrian by AD 117, ancient Rome expanded up to twenty-five times its area. The same time passed again before its fall in AD 476. Rome had expanded long before the empire reached its zenith with the conquest of Dacia in AD 106 (modern-day Romania) under Emperor Trajan. At its territorial peak under Trajan, the Roman Empire covered roughly five million square kilometres. Its population is uncertain: modern estimates commonly place the imperial population in the first and second centuries at roughly 60–70 million, while substantially higher figures remain debated. From the time of Caesar (100–44 BC) to the Fall of the Western Roman Empire, Rome dominated Southern Europe, the Mediterranean coast of Northern Africa and the Levant, including the ancient trade routes with population living outside. Ancient Rome has contributed greatly to the development of law, war, art, literature, architecture, technology and language in the Western world, and its history continues to have a major influence on the world today. The Latin language is the source of the Romance languages and long served as the principal liturgical language of the Latin Church. The Second Vatican Council retained Latin in the Latin rites while permitting wider use of vernacular languages; subsequent reforms expanded vernacular use, but did not abolish Latin. Latin also served in varying official and administrative roles in European polities, including the Polish–Lithuanian Commonwealth.

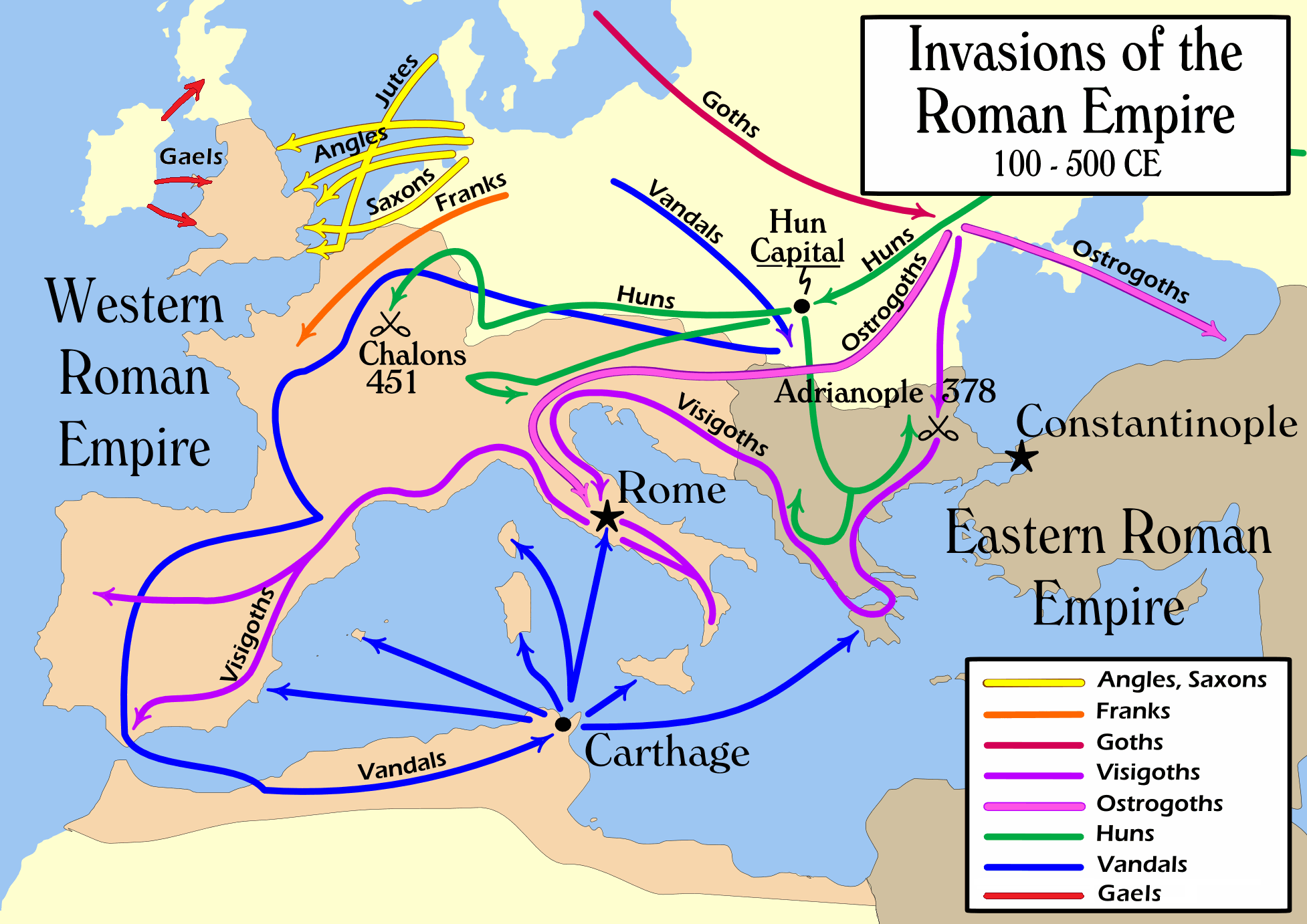
Ending invasions on Roman Empire since the 2nd and throughout the 5th centuries establishing mostly Germanic kingdoms in its place

In AD 395, a few decades before its Western collapse, the Roman Empire formally split into a Western and an Eastern one, each with their own emperors, capitals, and governments, although ostensibly they still belonged to one formal Empire. The Western Roman Empire provinces eventually were replaced by Northern European Germanic ruled kingdoms in the 5th century due to civil wars, corruption, and devastating Germanic invasions from such tribes as the Huns, Goths, the Franks and the Vandals by their late expansion throughout Europe. The three-day Visigoths's AD 410 sack of Rome who had been raiding Greece not long before, a shocking time for Greco-Romans, was the first time after almost 800 years that Rome had fallen to a foreign enemy, and St. Jerome, living in Bethlehem at the time, wrote that "The City which had taken the whole world was itself taken." There followed the sack of AD 455 lasting 14 days, this time conducted by the Vandals, retaining Rome's eternal spirit through the Holy See of Rome (the Latin Church) for centuries to come. The ancient Barbarian tribes, often composed of well-trained Roman soldiers paid by Rome to guard the extensive borders, had become militarily sophisticated "Romanized barbarians", and mercilessly slaughtered the Romans conquering their Western territories while looting their possessions.

The Roman Empire is where the idea of "the West" began to emerge. (Note: By Rome's central location at the heart of the Empire, "West" and "East" were terms used to denote provinces west and east of the capital itself. Therefore, Iberia (Portugal and Spain), Gaul (France), the Mediterranean coast of North Africa (Tunisia, Algeria, and Morocco) and Britannia were all part of the "West". Greece, Cyprus, Anatolia, Lebanon, Syria, Israel, Palestine, Egypt, and Libya were part of the "East". The administrative division between eastern and western imperial spheres sharpened under Diocletian and became a lasting political division after the death of Theodosius I in 395.)

The Eastern Roman Empire, governed from Constantinople, is usually referred to as the Byzantine Empire after AD 476, the traditional date for the fall of the Roman Empire and beginning of the Early Middle Ages. The survival of the Eastern Roman Empire protected Roman legal and cultural traditions, combining them with Greek and Christian elements, for another thousand years. The name Byzantine Empire was first used centuries later, after the Byzantine Empire ended. The dissolution of the Western half, nominally ended in AD 476, but in truth a long process that ended by the rise of Catholic Gaul (modern-day France) ruling from around the year AD 800, left only the Eastern Roman Empire alive. The Eastern half continued to think of itself as the Roman Empire. The inhabitants called themselves Romans because the term "Roman" was meant to signify all Christians. The Pope crowned Charlemagne as Emperor of the Romans of the newly established Holy Roman Empire, and the West began thinking in terms of Western Latins living in the old Western Empire, and Eastern Greeks (those inside the Roman remnant of the old Eastern Empire).

=== The birth of the European West during the Middle Ages ===
Apex of Byzantine Empire's conquests (AD 527–565)

In the early 4th century, the central focus of power was on two separate imperial legacies within the Roman Empire: the older Aegean Sea Greek heritage (of Classical Greece) in the Eastern Mediterranean, and the newer most successful Tyrrhenian Sea Latin heritage (of Ancient Latium and Tuscany) in the Western Mediterranean. A turning point was Constantine the Great's decision to establish the city of Constantinople (today's Istanbul) in modern-day Turkey as the "New Rome" when he picked it as capital of his Empire (later called "Byzantine Empire" by modern historians) in AD 330.

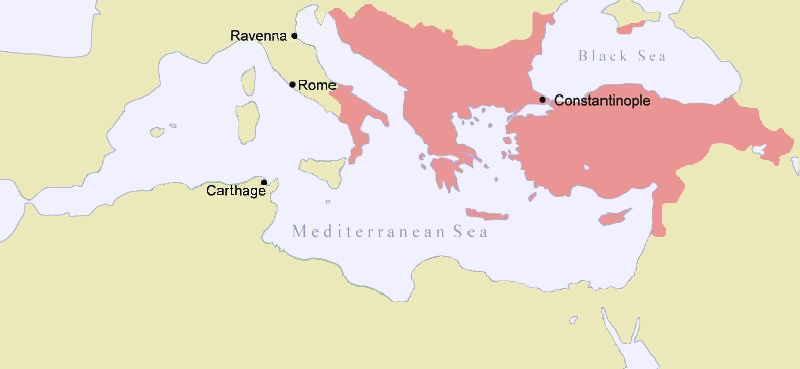
The Byzantine Empire in AD 1025 before Christian East-West Schism

The eastern and western halves of the Roman world developed distinct political and linguistic profiles over several centuries. Constantine established Constantinople as an imperial capital in 330, and after the death of Theodosius I in 395 the empire was governed permanently by separate eastern and western courts. The Christianization of imperial government also accelerated during the fourth century, especially under Theodosius I.

History of the spread of Christianity: in AD 325 (dark blue) and AD 600 (blue) following Western Roman Empire's collapse under Germanic migrations.

The Eastern Roman Empire included lands south-west of the Black Sea and bordering on the Eastern Mediterranean and parts of the Adriatic Sea. The older Greek–Latin cultural division was later reflected in the developing separation between Latin Christianity centered on Rome and Greek Christianity centered on Constantinople, although the ecclesiastical break was gradual and involved disputes over doctrine, jurisdiction, and practice rather than a simple dispute over a single religious capital.

As the Eastern (Orthodox) and Western (Catholic) churches spread their influence, the line between Eastern and Western Christianity was moving. Its movement was affected by the influence of the Byzantine empire and the fluctuating power and influence of the Catholic church in Rome. The resulting confessional geography broadly overlapped with older linguistic and political divisions, but it was never a perfectly fixed boundary.

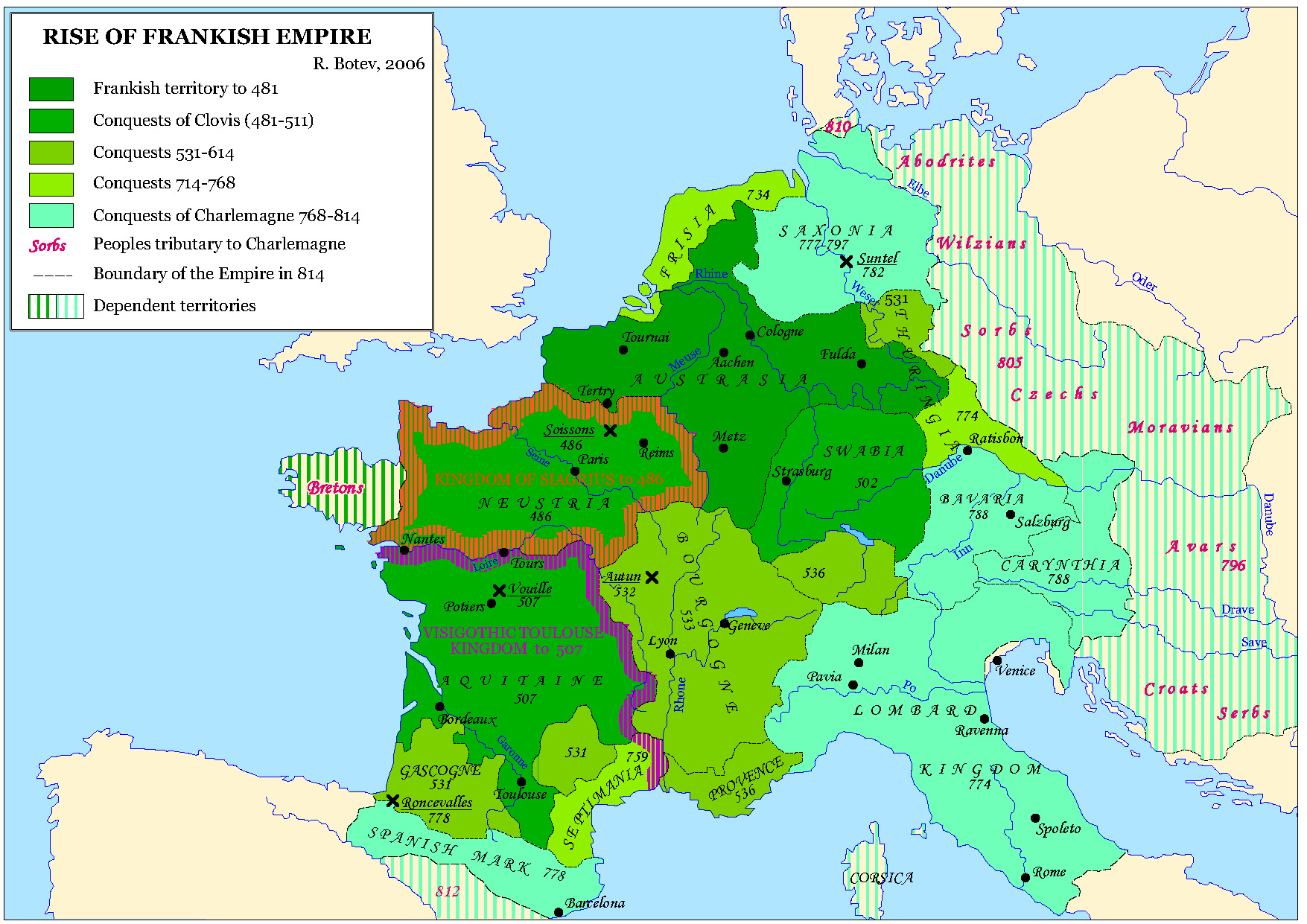
Rise of the Germanic Frankish Empire before Charlemagne's coronation in Rome

On Christmas Day 800, Pope Leo III crowned Charlemagne emperor in Rome. The act revived an imperial title in the Latin West and created a serious problem of legitimacy in relations with the Byzantine emperor, but it is misleading to describe Charlemagne's realm straightforwardly as the later Holy Roman Empire; the imperial line conventionally associated with that polity was revived under Otto I in 962.

The earliest concept of Europe as a cultural sphere (instead of simple geographic term) is believed to have been formed by Alcuin of York during the Carolingian Renaissance of the 9th century, but was limited to the territories that practised Western Christianity at the time.

The Latin Church of western and central Europe split with the eastern Greek patriarchates in the Christian East–West Schism, also known as the "Great Schism", during the Gregorian Reforms (calling for a more central status of the Roman Catholic Church Institution), three months after Pope Leo IX's death in April 1054. Following the 1054 Great Schism, both the Western Church and Eastern Church continued to consider themselves uniquely orthodox and catholic. Augustine wrote in On True Religion: "Religion is to be sought... only among those who are called Catholic or orthodox Christians, that is, guardians of truth and followers of right." Over time, the Western Christianity gradually identified with the "Catholic" label, and people of Western Europe gradually associated the "Orthodox" label with Eastern Christianity (although in some languages the "Catholic" label is not necessarily identified with the Western Church). This was in note of the fact that both Catholic and Orthodox were in use as ecclesiastical adjectives as early as the 2nd and 4th centuries respectively. Meanwhile, the extent of both Christendoms expanded, as Germanic peoples, Bohemia, Poland, Hungary, Scandinavia, Finnic peoples, Baltic peoples, British Isles and the other non-Christian lands of the northwest were converted by the Western Church, while Byzantine missions were especially influential among Bulgarians, Serbs, Rus' and other Slavic peoples, helping establish the long-term association of much of eastern and southeastern Europe with Eastern Christianity.

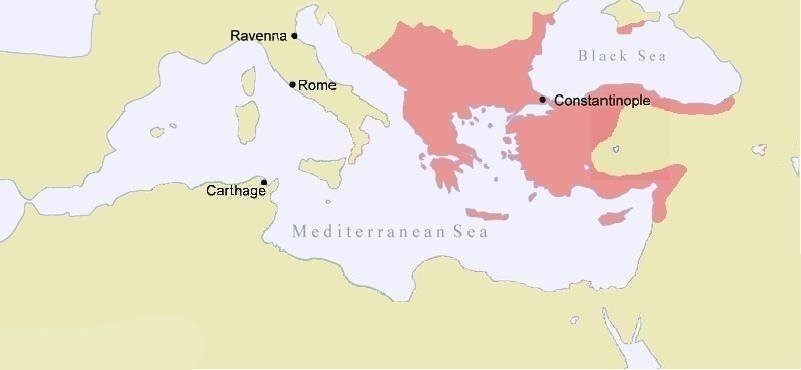
The Byzantine Empire in AD 1180 before Latin Fourth Crusade

In 1071, the Byzantine army was defeated by the Muslim Turco-Persians of medieval Asia, resulting in the loss of most of Asia Minor. The situation was a serious threat to the future of the Eastern Orthodox Byzantine Empire. The Emperor sent a plea to the Pope in Rome to send military aid to restore the lost territories to Christian rule. The result was a series of western European military campaigns into the eastern Mediterranean, known as the Crusades. Unfortunately for the Byzantines, the crusaders (belonging to the members of nobility from France, German territories, the Low countries, England and Italy) had no allegiance to the Byzantine Emperor and established their own states in the conquered regions, including the heart of the Byzantine Empire.

The Holy Roman Empire would dissolve on 6 August 1806, after the French Revolution and the creation of the Confederation of the Rhine by Napoleon.

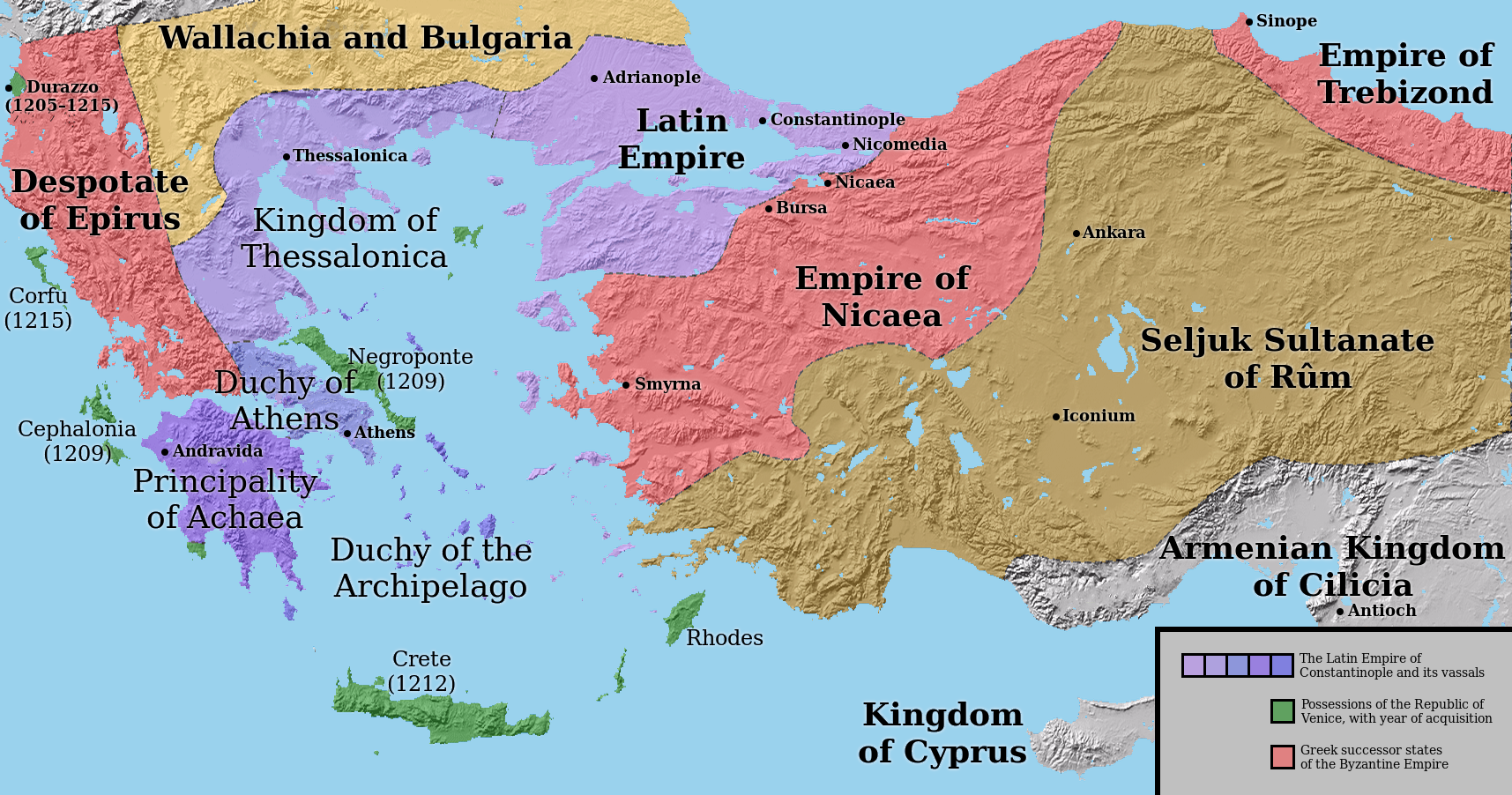
The Greek Byzantine Empire split by a newly established Latin Crusader State after the Fourth Crusade (shown partly in Greece and partly in Turkey)

The decline of the Byzantine Empire (13th–15th centuries) began with the Latin Christian Fourth Crusade in AD 1202–04, considered to be one of the most important events, solidifying the schism between the Christian churches of Greek Byzantine Rite and Latin Roman Rite. An anti-Western riot in 1182 broke out in Constantinople targeting Latins. The extremely wealthy (after previous Crusades) Venetians in particular made a successful attempt to maintain control over the coast of Catholic present-day Croatia (specifically the Dalmatia, a region of interest to the maritime medieval Venetian Republic moneylenders and its rivals, such as the Republic of Genoa) rebelling against the Venetian economic domination. What followed dealt an irrevocable blow to the already weakened Byzantine Empire with the Crusader army's sack of Constantinople in April 1204, capital of the Greek Christian-controlled Byzantine Empire, described as one of the most profitable and disgraceful sacks of a city in history. This paved the way for Muslim conquests in present-day Turkey and the Balkans in the coming centuries (only a handful of the Crusaders followed to the stated destination thereafter, the Holy Land). The geographical identity of the Balkans is historically known as a crossroads of cultures, a juncture between the Latin and Greek bodies of the Roman Empire, the destination of a massive influx of pagans (meaning "non-Christians") Bulgars and Slavs, an area where Catholic and Orthodox Christianity met, as well as the meeting point between Islam and Christianity. The Papal Inquisition was established in AD 1229 on a permanent basis, run largely by clergymen in Rome, and abolished six centuries later. Before AD 1100, the Catholic Church suppressed what they believed to be heresy, usually through a system of ecclesiastical proscription or imprisonment, but without using torture, and seldom resorting to executions.

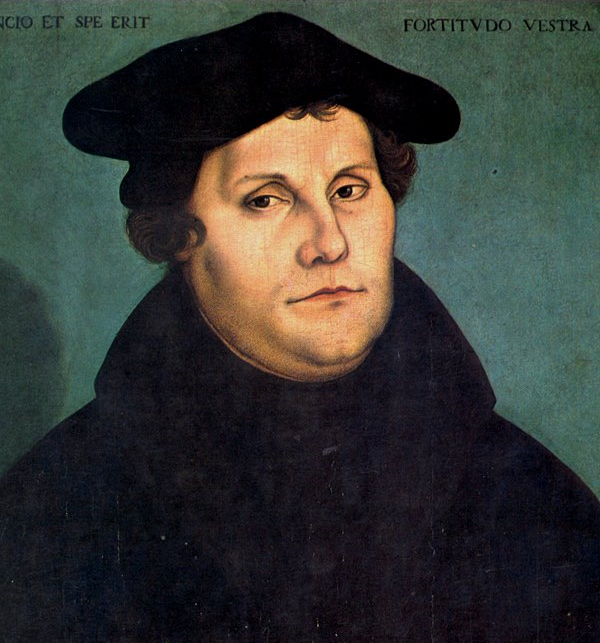
Martin Luther, Protestant Reformer

This very profitable Central European Fourth Crusade had prompted the 14th century Renaissance (translated as 'Rebirth') of Italian city-states including the Papal States, on eve of the Protestant Reformation and Counter-Reformation (which established the Roman Inquisition to succeed the Medieval Inquisition). There followed the discovery of the American continent, and consequent dissolution of West Christendom as even a theoretical unitary political body, later resulting in the religious Eighty Years War (1568–1648) and Thirty Years War (1618–1648) between various Protestant and Catholic states of the Holy Roman Empire (and emergence of religiously diverse confessions). In this context, the Protestant Reformation (1517) may be viewed as a schism within the Catholic Church. German monk Martin Luther, in the wake of precursors, broke with the pope and with the emperor by the Catholic Church's abusive commercialization of indulgences in the Late Medieval Period, backed by many of the German princes and helped by the development of the printing press, in an attempt to reform corruption within the church.

Both these religious wars ended with the Peace of Westphalia (1648), which enshrined the concept of the nation-state, and the principle of absolute national sovereignty in international law. As European influence spread across the globe, these Westphalian principles, especially the concept of sovereign states, became central to international law and to the prevailing world order.

=== Expansion of the West: the Era of Colonialism (15th–20th centuries) ===
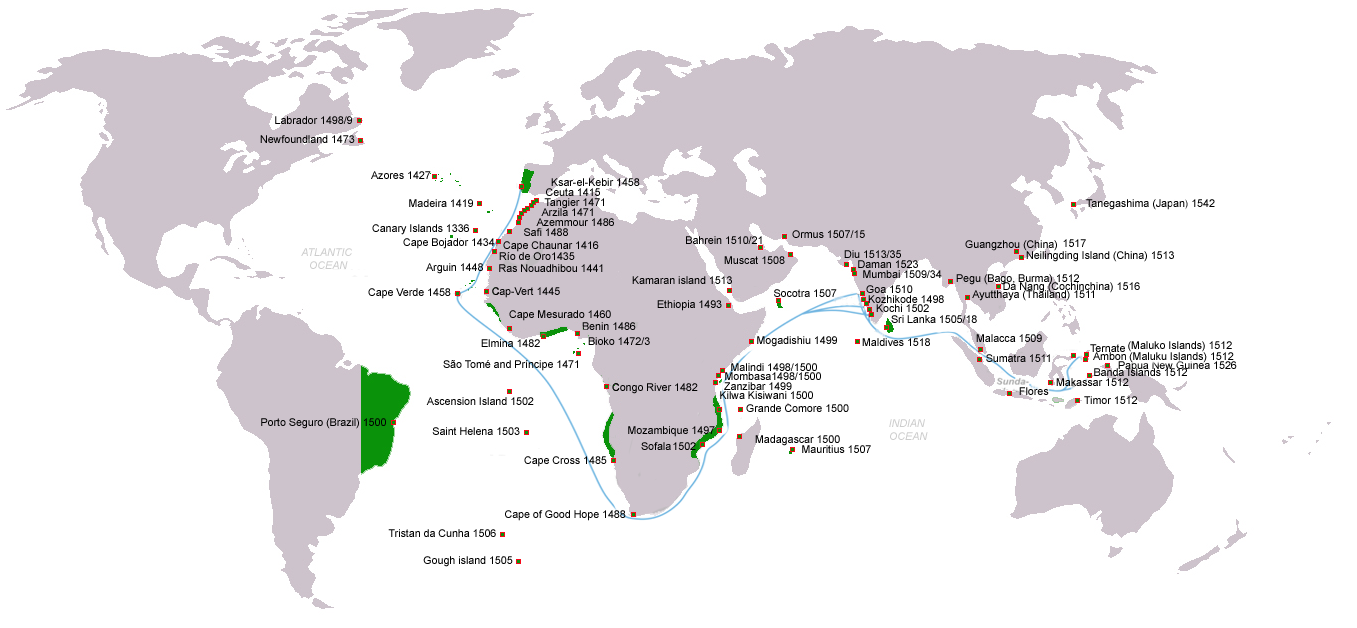
Portuguese discoveries and explorations since 1336: first arrival places and dates; main Portuguese spice trade routes in the Indian Ocean (blue); territories claimed by King John III of Portugal (c. 1536) (green)

Apex of Spanish Empire in 1790

In the 13th and 14th centuries, a number of European travelers, many of them Christian missionaries, had sought to cultivate trading with Asia and Africa. With the Crusades came the relative contraction of the Orthodox Byzantine's large silk industry in favor of Catholic Western Europe and the rise of Western Papacy. The most famous of these merchant travelers pursuing East–west trade was Venetian Marco Polo. These journeys expanded European geographical knowledge but did not create a durable European-controlled route to Asian markets. In the fifteenth century, Portuguese rulers increasingly sponsored Atlantic and African exploration in search of direct maritime access to the sources of valuable Asian trade goods; Ottoman expansion in the eastern Mediterranean was one factor in this changing commercial environment, but the common claim that the Ottomans simply 'closed' all overland routes is an oversimplification.

The Portuguese spearheaded the drive to find oceanic routes that would provide cheaper and easier access to South and East Asian goods, by advancements in maritime technology such as the caravel ship introduced in the mid-1400s. The charting of oceanic routes between East and West began with the unprecedented voyages of Portuguese and Spanish sea captains. In 1492, European colonialism expanded across the globe with the exploring voyage of merchant, navigator, and Hispano-Italian colonizer Christopher Columbus. Such voyages were influenced by medieval European adventurers after the European spice trade with Asia, who had journeyed overland to the Far East contributing to geographical knowledge of parts of the Asian continent. They are of enormous significance in Western history as they marked the beginning of the European exploration, colonization and exploitation of the American continents and their native inhabitants. (Note: Portuguese sailors began sustained exploration of the Atlantic islands and West African coast in the early fifteenth century, supported by advances in navigation and ship design and by the search for new trade routes. In 1488, Bartolomeu Dias became the first European navigator known to have rounded the southern tip of Africa and entered the Indian Ocean from the Atlantic. In 1492 Christopher Columbus landed in the Bahamas on behalf of the Crown of Castile. The Spanish sovereigns—not Pope Alexander VI—granted Columbus the right to a coat of arms by letters patent dated 20 May 1493; Columbus later altered the design on his own authority, as shown in his 1502 Book of Privileges. The transatlantic voyages of the late fifteenth century opened a sustained era of European exploration, conquest and colonization in the Americas. Iberian expansion was accompanied by Catholic missionary activity, while Renaissance humanism and the recovery and circulation of Greek and Roman texts helped reshape European intellectual culture. These developments overlapped with, rather than single-handedly created, the transition conventionally described as the early modern period. In 1497 Portuguese navigator Vasco da Gama sailed from Lisbon on the expedition that reached India by sea in 1498, establishing the first direct all-sea route from Europe to India around the Cape of Good Hope. In 1520, Ferdinand Magellan, a Portuguese navigator in the service of the Crown of Castile ('Spain'), found a sea route into the Pacific Ocean.) (Note: In the 16th century, the Portuguese broke the (overland) medieval monopoly of the Arabs and Italians of trade (goods and slaves) between Asia and Europe by the discovery of the sea route to India around the Cape of Good Hope. With the ensuing rise of the rival Dutch East India Company, Portuguese influence in Asia was gradually eclipsed; Dutch forces first established fortified independent bases in the East and then between 1640 and 1660 wrestled some southern Indian ports, and the lucrative Japan trade from the Portuguese. Later, the English and the French established some settlements in India and trade with China, and their own acquisitions would gradually surpass those of the Dutch. In 1763, the British eliminated French influence in India and established the British East India Company as the most important political force on the Indian subcontinent.) The European colonization of the Americas led to the Atlantic slave trade between the 1490s and the 1800s, which also contributed to the development of African intertribal warfare and racist ideology. Before the abolition of its slave trade in 1807, the British Empire alone (which had started colonial efforts in 1578, almost a century after Portuguese and Spanish empires) was responsible for the transportation of 3.5 million African slaves to the Americas, a third of all slaves transported across the Atlantic. The Holy Roman Empire was dissolved in 1806 amid the Napoleonic reorganization of Germany. The various inquisitorial institutions of the Catholic world were abolished at different times and places rather than in one single event immediately following 1806.

Due to the reach of these empires, Western institutions expanded throughout the world. This process of influence (and imposition) began with the voyages of discovery, colonization, conquest, and exploitation of Portugal enforced as well by papal bulls in 1450s (by the fall of the Byzantine Empire), granting Portugal navigation, war and trade monopoly for any newly discovered lands, and competing Spanish navigators. It continued through the rise of chartered companies such as the Dutch East India Company and the creation and expansion of English, French and other European colonial empires. Even after demands for self-determination from subject peoples within Western empires were met with decolonization, these institutions persisted. One specific example was the requirement that post-colonial societies were made to form nation-states (in the Western tradition), which often created arbitrary boundaries and borders that did not necessarily represent a whole nation, people, or culture (as in much of Africa), and are often the cause of international conflicts and friction even to this day. Across the colonial period, European institutions, languages, religions and cultural practices spread globally through a mixture of coercion, settlement, commerce, missionary activity and local adaptation. Historically colonialism had been justified with the values of individualism and enlightenment.

The concepts of a world of nation-states born by the Peace of Westphalia in 1648, coupled with the ideologies of the Enlightenment, the coming of modernity, the Scientific Revolution and the Industrial Revolution, would produce powerful social transformations, political and economic institutions that have come to influence (or been imposed upon) most nations of the world today. Historians agree that the Industrial Revolution has been one of the most important events in history.

Over the following three centuries, European colonization, the forced migration of Africans through the Atlantic slave trade, and the growth of British colonies in North America formed part of the historical background from which the United States emerged. The United States Constitution was drafted in 1787 and entered into force after ratification by the required nine states in 1788.

==== Enlightenment (17th–18th centuries) ====
Eric Voegelin described the 18th century as one where "the sentiment grows that one age has come to its close and that a new age of Western civilization is about to be born". According to Voeglin the Enlightenment (also called the Age of Reason) represents the "atrophy of Christian transcendental experiences and [seeks] to enthrone the Newtonian method of science as the only valid method of arriving at truth". Its precursors were John Milton and Baruch Spinoza. Meeting Galileo in 1638 left an enduring impact on John Milton and influenced Milton's great work Areopagitica, where he warns that, without free speech, inquisitorial forces will impose "an undeserved thraldom upon learning".

The achievements of the 17th century included the invention of the telescope and acceptance of heliocentrism. Eighteenth-century scholars continued to refine Newton's theory of gravitation, notably Leonhard Euler, Pierre Louis Maupertuis, Alexis-Claude Clairaut, Jean Le Rond d'Alembert, Joseph-Louis Lagrange, Pierre-Simon de Laplace. Laplace's five-volume Treatise on Celestial Mechanics is one of the great works of 18th-century Newtonianism. Astronomy gained in prestige as new observatories were funded by governments and more powerful telescopes developed, leading to the discovery of new planets, asteroids, nebulae and comets, and paving the way for improvements in navigation and cartography. Astronomy became the second most popular scientific profession, after medicine.

A common metanarrative of the Enlightenment is the "secularization theory". Modernity, as understood within the framework, means a total break with the past. Innovation and science are the good, representing the modern values of rationalism, while faith is ruled by superstition and traditionalism. Inspired by the Scientific Revolution, the Enlightenment embodied the ideals of improvement and progress. Descartes and Isaac Newton were regarded as exemplars of human intellectual achievement. Condorcet wrote about the progress of humanity in the Sketch for a Historical Picture of the Progress of the Human Mind (1794), from primitive society to agrarianism, the invention of writing, the later invention of the printing press and the advancement to "the Period when the Sciences and Philosophy threw off the Yoke of Authority".

French writer Pierre Bayle denounced Spinoza as a pantheist (thereby accusing him of atheism). Bayle's criticisms garnered much attention for Spinoza. The pantheism controversy in the late 18th century saw Gotthold Lessing attacked by Friedrich Heinrich Jacobi over support for Spinoza's pantheism. Lessing was defended by Moses Mendelssohn, although Mendelssohn diverged from pantheism to follow Gottfried Wilhelm Leibniz in arguing that God and the world were not of the same substance (equivalency). Spinoza was excommunicated from the Dutch Sephardic community, but for Jews who sought out Jewish sources to guide their own path to secularism, Spinoza was as important as Voltaire and Kant.

==== 19th century ====
In the early 19th century, the systematic urbanization process (migration from villages in search of jobs in manufacturing centers) had begun, and the concentration of labor into factories led to the rise in the population of the towns. World population had been rising as well. It is estimated to have first reached one billion in 1804. Also, the new philosophical movement later known as Romanticism originated, in the wake of the previous Age of Reason of the 1600s and the Enlightenment of 1700s. These are seen as fostering the 19th century Western world's sustained economic development. Before the urbanization and industrialization of the 1800s, demand for oriental goods such as porcelain, silk, spices and tea remained the driving force behind European imperialism in Asia, and (with the important exception of British East India Company rule in India) the European stake in Asia remained confined largely to trading stations and strategic outposts necessary to protect trade. Industrialization, however, dramatically increased European demand for Asian raw materials; and the severe Long Depression of the 1870s provoked a scramble for new markets for European industrial products and financial services in Africa, the Americas, Eastern Europe, and especially in Asia (Western powers exploited their advantages in China for example by the Opium Wars). This resulted in the "New Imperialism", which saw a shift in focus from trade and indirect rule to formal colonial control of vast overseas territories ruled as political extensions of their mother countries. (Note: The Scramble for Africa was the occupation, division, and colonization of African territory by European powers during the period of New Imperialism, between 1881 and 1914. It is also called the 'Partition of Africa' and by some the 'Conquest of Africa'. In 1870, only 10 percent of Africa was under formal Western/European control; by 1914 it had increased to almost 90 percent of the continent, with only Ethiopia (Abyssinia), the Dervish state (a portion of present-day Somalia) and Liberia still being independent.) The later years of the 19th century saw the transition from "informal imperialism" (hegemony) (Note: In ancient Greece (8th century BC – AD 6th century), hegemony denoted the politico-military dominance of a city-state over other city-states. The dominant state is known as the hegemon.) by military influence and economic dominance, to direct rule (a revival of colonial imperialism) in the African continent and Middle East.

During the socioeconomically optimistic and innovative decades of the Second Industrial Revolution between the 1870s and 1914, also known as the "Beautiful Era", the established colonial powers in Asia (United Kingdom, France, Netherlands) added to their empires also vast expanses of territory in the Indian subcontinent and Southeast Asia. Japan was involved primarily during the Meiji period (1868–1912), though earlier contacts with the Portuguese, Spaniards and Dutch were also present in the Japanese Empire's recognition of the strategic importance of European nations. During the Meiji period, Japan's government rapidly centralized administration, built modern industries and infrastructure, created a national education system and conscript army, and consciously studied Western institutions as part of a program of state strengthening.

At the close of the Spanish–American War in 1898 the Philippines, Puerto Rico, Guam and Cuba were ceded to the United States under the terms of the Treaty of Paris. The US quickly emerged as the new imperial power in East Asia and in the Pacific Ocean area. The Philippines continued to fight against colonial rule in the Philippine–American War.

By 1913, the British Empire held sway over 412 million people, 23% of the world population at the time, and by 1920, it covered 35,500,000 km^{2} (13,700,000 sq mi), 24% of the Earth's total land area. At its apex, the phrase "the empire on which the sun never sets" described the British Empire, because its expanse around the globe meant that the sun always shone on at least one of its territories. As a result, British political, legal, linguistic and cultural institutions left enduring legacies in many former colonies. After the Second World War, decolonization accelerated through anticolonial movements, changing metropolitan politics and international pressure. In 1960 the United Nations General Assembly adopted Resolution 1514 (XV), declaring the right of colonial peoples to self-determination and calling for a speedy and unconditional end to colonialism; several colonial powers abstained rather than support the resolution.

Most of the colonized nations received independence by 1960. Great Britain showed ongoing responsibility for the welfare of its former colonies as member states of the Commonwealth of Nations. But the end of Western colonial imperialism saw the rise of Western neocolonialism or economic imperialism. Multinational corporations came to offer "a dramatic refinement of the traditional business enterprise", through "issues as far ranging as national sovereignty, ownership of the means of production, environmental protection, consumerism, and policies toward organized labor." Though the overt colonial era had passed, Western nations, as comparatively rich, well-armed, and culturally powerful states, wielded a large degree of influence throughout the world, and with little or no sense of responsibility toward the peoples impacted by its multinational corporations in their exploitation of minerals and markets. The dictum of Alfred Thayer Mahan is shown to have lasting relevance, that whoever controls the seas controls the world.

=== Cold War (1947–1991) ===
During the Cold War, geopolitical writing commonly distinguished a U.S.-led or capitalist "First World" from a Soviet-led communist "Second World"; the term "Third World" came to be associated especially with newly independent and developing states, many of which sought to avoid formal alignment with either superpower through the Non-Aligned Movement.

The Soviet-led bloc included the Soviet Union and the members of the Warsaw Pact, while the U.S.-led alliance system included NATO and other partners. Neutral European countries do not fit neatly into the three-world schema and should not automatically be classified as "Third World" merely because they were non-aligned. Finland, for example, pursued a policy of Cold War neutrality while maintaining its independence and a market economy.

Spain joined NATO on 30 May 1982, seven years after Franco's death. The Cold War ended through a sequence of events including reforms under Mikhail Gorbachev, the revolutions of 1989 in Eastern Europe, German reunification, and the dissolution of the Soviet Union in December 1991.

== Modern definitions ==
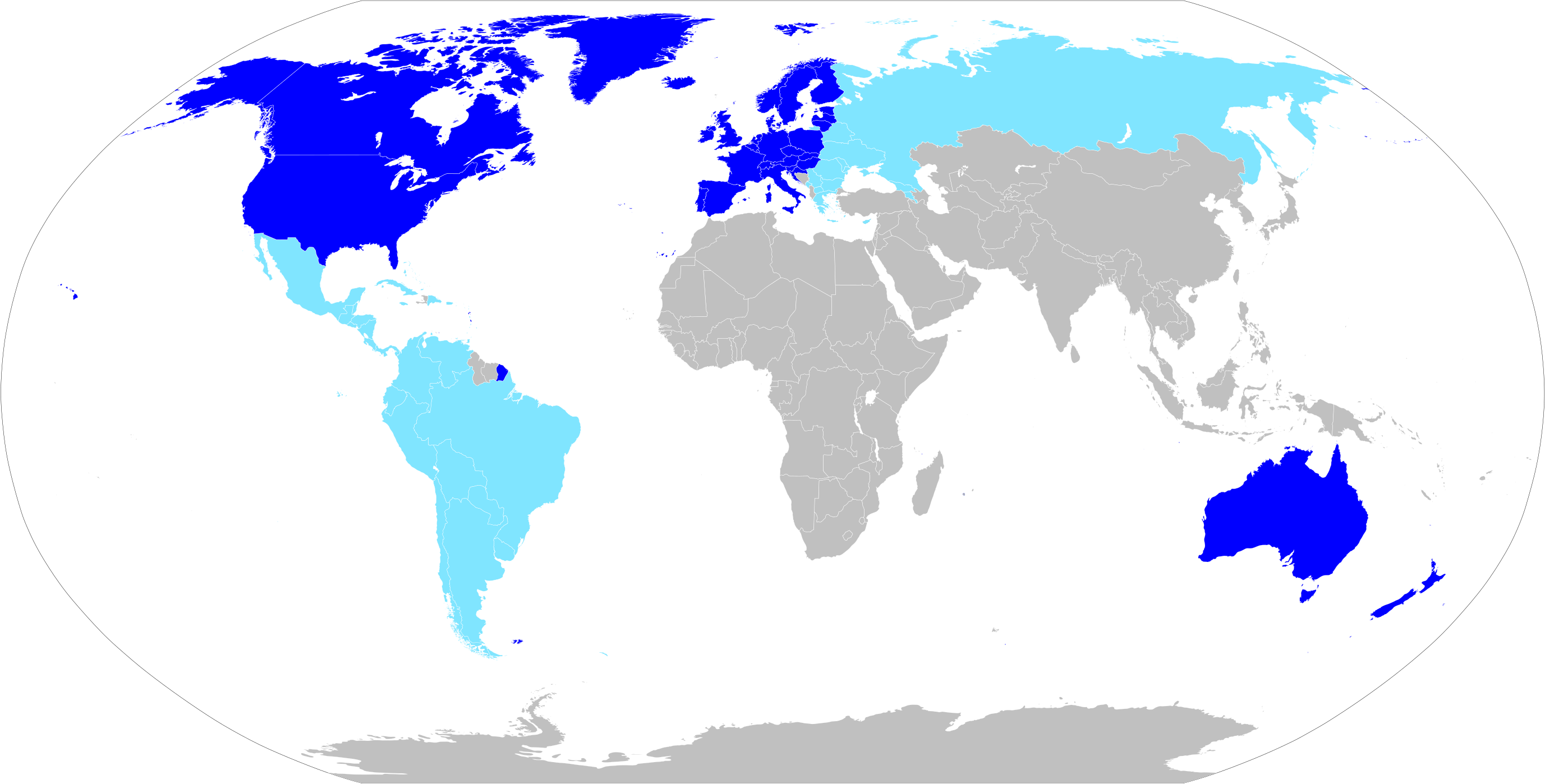
A map of the "Western world" based-on Samuel P. Huntington's 1996 Clash of Civilizations. In turquoise are the Orthodox World and Latin America, which are either a part of the West or distinct civilizations intimately related to the West.

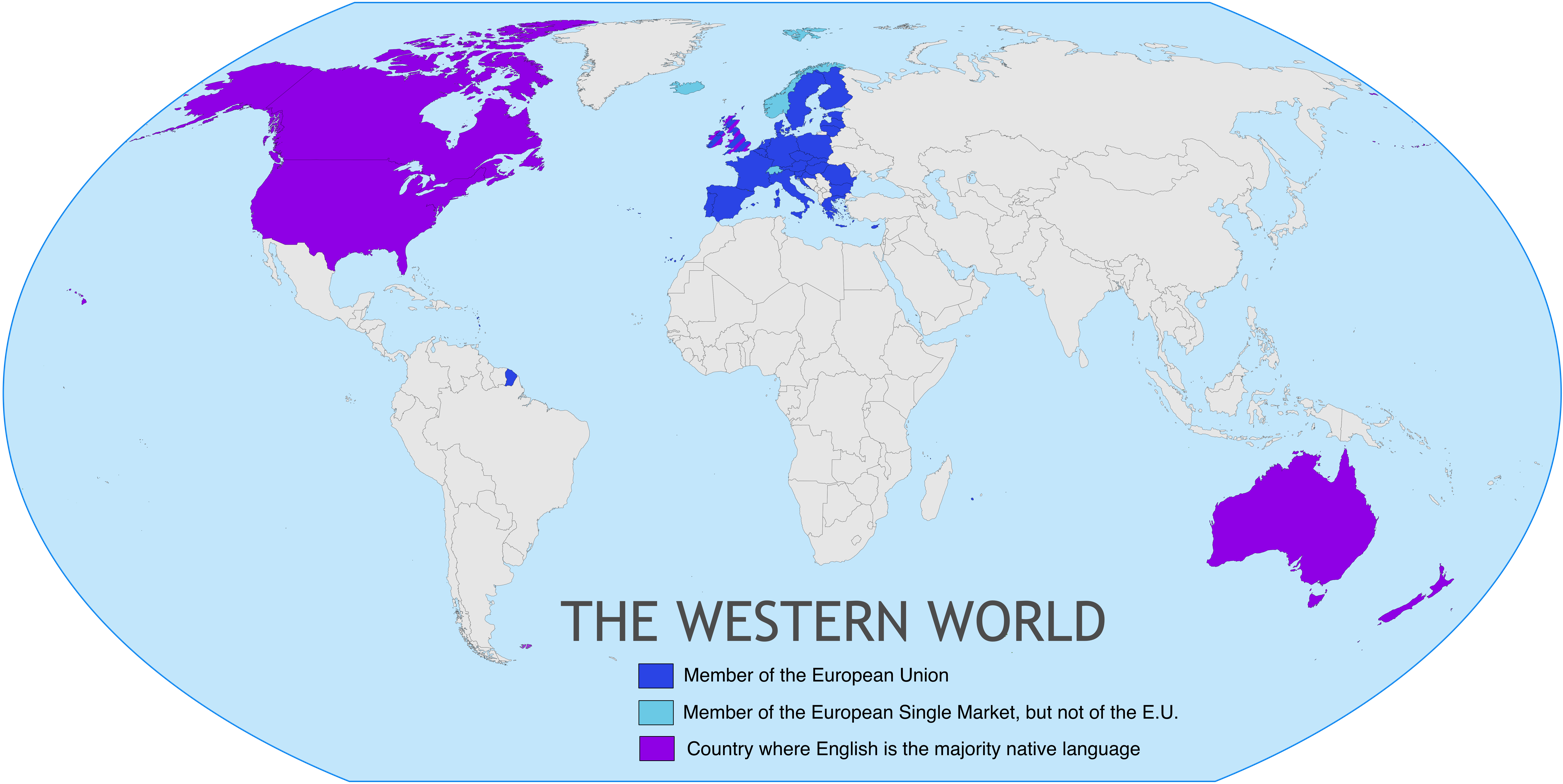
Map of the Western world consisting of the anglosphere (as defined by James Bennett), the European Union and European Single Market members, 2017

Asia (as the "Eastern world"), the Arab world, and Africa

The exact scope of the Western world is somewhat subjective in nature, depending on whether cultural, economic, spiritual or political criteria are employed. It is a generally accepted Western view to recognize the existence of at least three "major worlds" (or "cultures", or "civilizations"), broadly in contrast with the Western: the Eastern world, the Arab and the African worlds, with no clearly specified boundaries. Additionally, the Orthodox European and Latin American worlds are sometimes either a sub-civilization within Western civilization or separately considered "akin" to the West. One popular definition of the West is from Samuel Huntington in his book Clash of Civilizations. Later researchers built on this definition by testing cultural differences in survey responses based on Western cultures (such as the US, UK, and Germany), non-Western cultures (such as China and Madagascar), and "sometimes Western" cultures, which describes cultures that have more mixed psychological profiles (such as Russia and Brazil).

NATO Member States and NATO Global Partners.

Regions of the world (in dark blue) where a Romance language, which is any language that evolved out of Latin, the main language of the Roman Empire, is spoken as a native language by the majority of the population.

Many anthropologists, sociologists and historians oppose "the West and the Rest" in a categorical manner. The same has been done by Malthusian demographers with a sharp distinction between European and non-European family systems. Among anthropologists, this includes Durkheim, Dumont, and Lévi-Strauss. However, social scientists have pointed to the statistical power of even these coarse categories. For example, a study of survey responses in 100 cultures found that a three-category analysis (Western, non-Western, and "sometimes Western") could explain 25% of the variance, whereas splitting the data into 100 cultures explained 32% of the variance. This suggests that a broad categorization--despite obviously simplifying over real differences--can still explain a meaningful percentage of the variance across cultures.

=== Cultural definition ===
The Oxford English dictionary noted that the earliest use of the term "Western world" in the English language was in 1586, found in the writings of William Warner.

In modern usage, Western world refers to Europe and to areas whose populations largely originate from Europe, through the Age of Discovery's imperialism.

Western Christianity by country in 2010

In the 20th century, Christianity declined in influence in many Western countries, mostly in the European Union where some member states have experienced falling church attendance and membership in recent years, and also elsewhere. Secularism (separating religion from politics and science) increased. However, while church attendance is in decline, in some Western countries (i.e. Italy, Poland, and Portugal), more than half of the people state that religion is important, and most Westerners nominally identify themselves as Christians (e.g. 59% in the United Kingdom) and attend church on major occasions, such as Christmas and Easter. In the Americas, Christianity continues to play an important societal role, though in areas such as Canada, a low level of religiosity is common due to a European-type secularization. The official religions of the United Kingdom and some Nordic countries are forms of Christianity, while the majority of European countries have no official religion. Despite this, Christianity, in its different forms, remains the largest faith in most Western countries.

Christianity remains the dominant religion in the Western world, where 70% are Christians. A 2011 Pew Research Center survey found that 76.2% of Europeans, 73.3% in Oceania, and about 86.0% in the Americas (90% in Latin America and the Caribbean and 77.4% in Northern America) described themselves as Christians.

Since the mid-twentieth century, the west became known for its irreligious sentiments, following the Age of Enlightenment and the French Revolution, inquisitions were abolished in the 19th and 20th centuries, this hastened the separation of church and state, and secularization of the Western world where unchurched spirituality is gaining more prominence over organized religion.

Certain parts of the Western world have become notable for their diversity since the late 1960s. Earlier, between the eighteenth century to mid-twentieth century, prominent western countries like the United States, Canada, Brazil, Argentina, Australia, Uruguay, and New Zealand have been once envisioned as homelands for whites. Racism has been noted as a contributing factor to Westerners' colonization of the New World, which makes up much of the geographical West today.

Countries in the Western world are also the most keen on digital and televisual media technologies, as they were in the postwar period on television and radio: from 2000 to 2014, the Internet's market penetration in the West was twice that in non-Western regions.

=== Economic definition ===
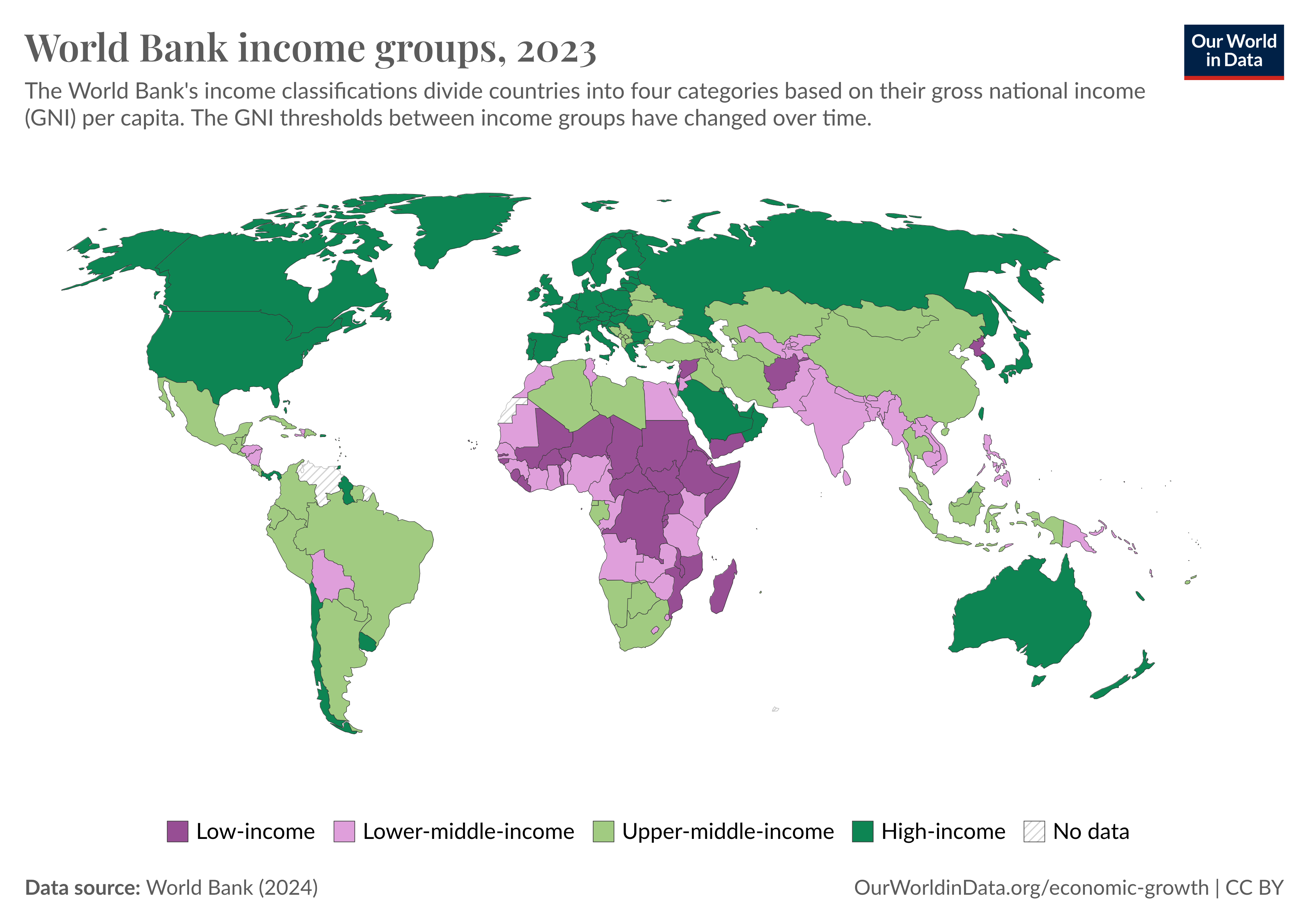
Countries by income group

The term "Western world" is sometimes interchangeably used with the term First World or developed countries, stressing the difference between First World and the Third World or developing countries. This usage occurs despite the fact that many countries that may be culturally Western are developing countries – in fact, a significant percentage of the Americas are developing countries. It is also used despite many developed countries or regions not being culturally Western (e.g. Japan, Singapore, South Korea, Taiwan, Hong Kong, and Macao). Privatization policies (involving government enterprises and public services) and multinational corporations are often considered a visible sign of Western nations' economic presence, especially in Third World countries, and represent a common institutional environment for powerful politicians, enterprises, trade unions and firms, bankers and thinkers of the Western world.

== Other views ==
A series of scholars of civilization, including Arnold J. Toynbee, Alfred Kroeber and Carroll Quigley have identified and analyzed "Western civilization" as one of the civilizations that have historically existed and still exist today. Toynbee entered into quite an expansive mode, including as candidates those countries or cultures who became so heavily influenced by the West as to adopt these borrowings into their very self-identity. Carried to its limit, this would in practice include almost everyone within the West, in one way or another. In particular, Toynbee refers to the intelligentsia formed among the educated elite of countries impacted by the European expansion of centuries past. While often pointedly nationalist, these cultural and political leaders interacted within the West to such an extent as to change both themselves and the West.

The theologian and paleontologist Pierre Teilhard de Chardin conceived of the West as the set of civilizations descended from the Nile Valley Civilization of Egypt.

The idea of "the West" over the course of time has evolved from a directional concept to a sociopolitical concept, and has been temporalized and rendered as a concept of the future bestowed with notions of progress and modernity.

Some scholars, like Kwame Anthony Appiah and Naoíse Mac Sweeny, have argued that "the West" is too broad and fluid to form a single coherent civilization, backing their points with the diverse origins of supposedly Western concepts and inventions, along with the populations of "the West". They posit that the concept is more rooted in imperialist and white nationalist mythmaking than reality.

In 2012, geopolitical analysts Bruce Jones and Thomas Wright proposed a functional definition of the West that included non-traditional nations like South Korea and Turkey based on their economic dynamism and alignment with the U.S.-led international order.

== See also ==
- Americas
- Anti-Western sentiment
- Atlanticism
- East–West dichotomy
- Far West
- Global Northwest
- Global North and Global South
- Monroe Doctrine
- Western Hemisphere
- Western culture
- Greater Europe
- Eastern Orthodoxy in Europe

== Bibliography ==
- Daus, Ronald (1983). Die Erfindung des Kolonialismus. Wuppertal/Germany: Peter Hammer Verlag. ISBN 978-3-87294-202-9.
- Hunt, Lynn; Martin, Thomas R.; Rosenwein, Barbara H.; Smith, Bonnie G. (2015). The Making of the West: People and Cultures. Bedford/St. Martin's. p. 4. ISBN 978-1457681523.
- Hanson, Victor Davis (2007). Carnage and Culture: Landmark Battles in the Rise to Western Power. Knopf Doubleday Publishing Group. ISBN 978-0-307-42518-8.
- Spielvogel, Jackson J. (2006). Western Civilization. Wadsworth. pp. xxxiii, 918. ISBN 9780534646028.
- Stearns, Peter N. (2008). Western Civilization in World History. Routledge. pp. 91–95. ISBN 9781134374755.
- Sharon, Moshe (2004). Studies in Modern Religions, Religious Movements and the Babi-Baha'i Faiths. Brill Academic Publishers. p. 12. ISBN 978-9004139046.
- Pagden, Anthony (2008). Worlds at War The 2,500-Year Struggle Between East and West. Oxford University Press. pp. xi, xv, 39. ISBN 9780199237432.
- Cartledge, Paul (2002). The Greeks A Portrait of Self and Others. Oxford University Press. ISBN 978-0191577833.
- Freeman, Charles (2000). The Greek Achievement: The Foundation of the Western World. Penguin Publishing Group. p. 434. ISBN 978-0140293234.
- Richard, Carl J. (2010). Why We're All Romans: The Roman Contribution to the Western World. Rowman & Littlefield Publishers. ISBN 978-0742567801.
- Grant, Michael (1991). The Founders of the Western World: A History of Greece and Rome. New York : Scribner : Maxwell Macmillan International. ISBN 978-0684193038.
- Nayak, Meghana; Selbin, Eric (2010). Decentering International Relations. Bloomsbury Publishing. p. 2. ISBN 9781848132405.
- Lazar, Michelle M. (2005). Feminist Critical Discourse Analysis Studies in Gender, Power and Ideology. Springer. p. 15. ISBN 9780230599901.
- Ware, Kallistos (1993). The Orthodox Church. Penguin Books. ISBN 9780140146561.
- Durant, Will; Durant, Ariel (2012). The Lessons of History. Simon and Schuster. ISBN 9781439170199.
- Peterson, Paul Silas (2019). The Decline of Established Christianity in the Western World. Routledge. pp. 26, 46, 76, 84. ISBN 9780367891381. Archived from the original on 29 January 2023.
- Pierce, Jason E. (2016). Making the White Man's West: Whiteness and the Creation of the American West. University Press of Colorado. pp. 123–150. ISBN 978-1-60732-396-9. JSTOR j.ctt19jcg63. Archived from the original on 20 November 2022.
- Kaufmann, Eric (2018). Whiteshift: Populism, Immigration and the Future of White Majorities. Penguin Books. ISBN 9780241317105.
- Ward, Peter (2002). White Canada Forever. McGill-Queen's University Press – MQUP. ISBN 9780773523227. Archived from the original on 1 January 2023.
- Green, James N.; Skidmore, Thomas (2021). Brazil: Five Centuries of Change. Oxford University Press. ISBN 978-0190068981. Archived from the original on 3 December 2022.
- Cotter, Anne-Marie Mooney (2016). Culture Clash: An International Legal Perspective on Ethnic Discrimination. Routledge. p. 12. ISBN 9781317155867.
- Jalata, Asafa (2002). Fighting Against the Injustice of the State and Globalization. Springer. p. 40. ISBN 9780312299071.
- Carlin, Na'ama (2022). Morality, Violence, and Ritual Circumcision. Routledge. p. 34. ISBN 978-0367551957. Archived from the original on 31 December 2022.
- Verger, Jacques [in French] (1999). Culture, enseignement et société en Occident aux XIIe et XIIIe siècles (in French) (1st ed.). Presses universitaires de Rennes in Rennes. ISBN 286847344X.
- Vintges, Karen (2017). A New Dawn for the Second Sex: Women's Freedom Practices in World Perspective. Amsterdam University Press. pp. 59–94. ISBN 978-90-8964-602-6. JSTOR j.ctt1s475v4.6. Archived from the original on 20 November 2022.
