= Byzantine commonwealth =

Cultural sphere of the Byzantine Empire

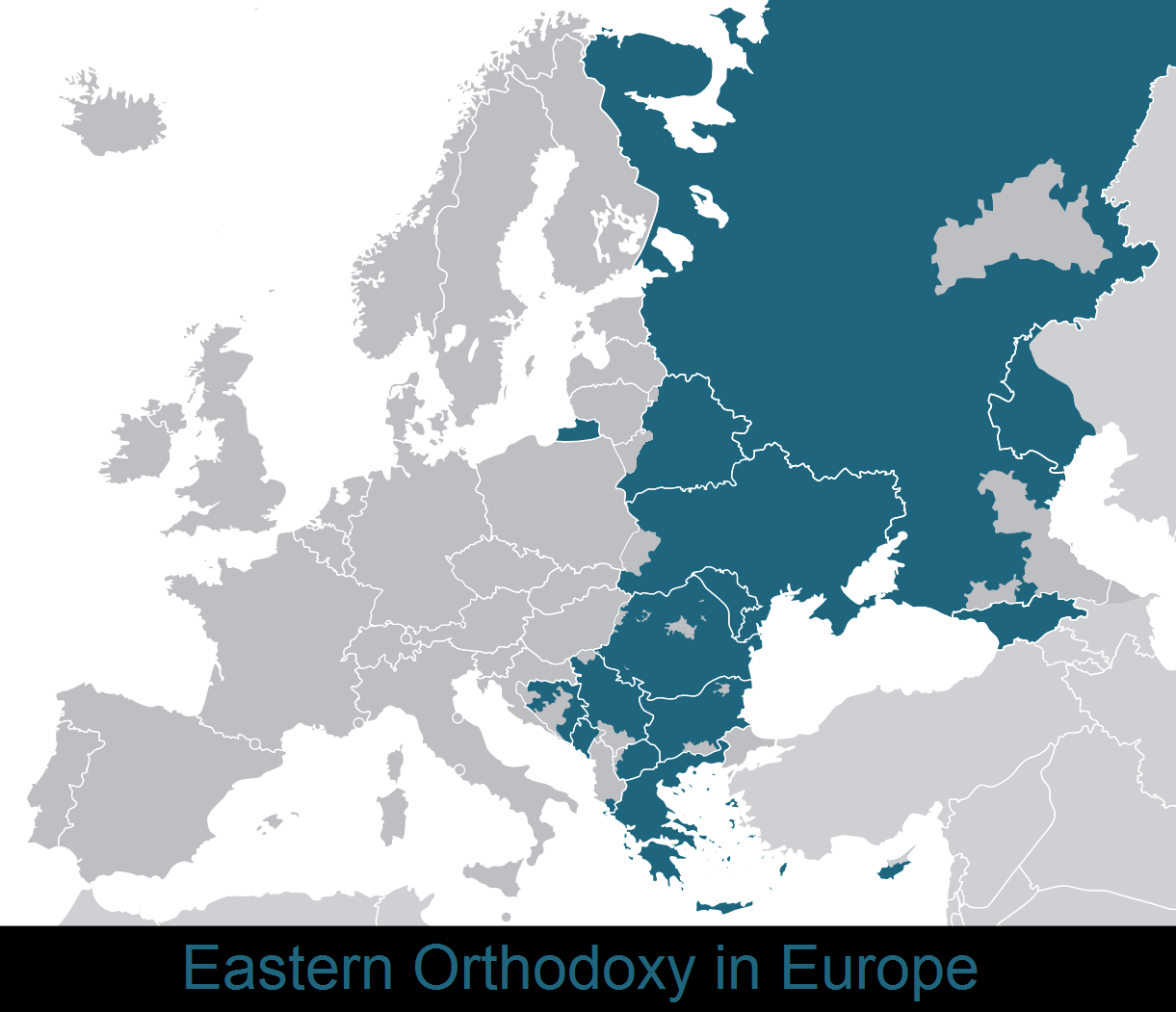
Eastern Orthodoxy in Europe

The term Byzantine commonwealth was coined by 20th-century historian Dimitri Obolensky to refer to the area where Byzantine general influence (Byzantine liturgical and cultural tradition) was spread during the Middle Ages by the Byzantine Empire and its missionaries. This area covers approximately the modern-day countries of Greece, Cyprus, North Macedonia, Bulgaria, Serbia, Montenegro, Romania, Moldova, Ukraine, Belarus, southwestern Russia, and Georgia (known as the region of Eastern Orthodoxy in Europe or the Orthodox Civilization). According to Anthony Kaldellis, the Byzantines in general did not have a ecumenical outlook, nor did they think about the notion of a panorthodox commonwealth, which he describes as "Roman chauvinism".

== The Obolensky model ==
The most important treatment of the concept is a study by Dimitri Obolensky, The Byzantine Commonwealth. In his book Six Byzantine Portraits he examined the life and works of six persons mentioned in The Byzantine Commonwealth. He also described the commonwealth as the international community within the sphere of authority of the Byzantine emperor, bound by the same profession of Orthodox Christianity, and accepting the principles of Romano-Byzantine law.

== Criticism ==
There are scholars, however, who criticize this conceptualization, disputing the notion of Byzantine cultural and ideological supremacy. It is argued that the complex and multi-faceted dynamics of documented cultural exchange was not aligned with the theory that Constantinople was the superior core while those in periphery understood their marginal position and merely imitated their superiors. Instead of Byzantine commonwealth, historian Christian Raffensperger, proposed that it be recast as the "Byzantine ideal". For instance, while the Bulgarian Empire was often a powerful rival of the Byzantine Empire during the Middle Ages, the Bulgarian tsars nonetheless framed their authority in a manner not hostile to 'Byzantism' per-se, styling themselves in a manner based on Orthodox Roman ideology and artistic style and calling themselves emperors of the Romans as well as tsar of Bulgarians. The same would apply to the Serbian Empire, and even the Ottoman Empire, with Mehmed II styling himself Qayser-i Rûm. Obolensky's concept of a "Byzantine commonwealth" was recast by Christian Raffensperger as the "Byzantine ideal", according to which even in the later period of the empire, when the reach and sway of the empire were diminished, the rulers still maintained this conception of imperial hierarchy.

== See also ==
- Byzantinism
- Byzantine culture
- Christendom
- Eastern Orthodox Church
- Eastern Orthodoxy by country
- Problem of two emperors
- Rum Millet
- Succession of the Roman Empire

== Sources ==
- Obolensky, Dimitri (1974) [1971]. The Byzantine Commonwealth: Eastern Europe, 500-1453. London: Cardinal. ISBN 9780351176449.
- Hilsdale, Cecily J. (20 February 2014). Byzantine Art and Diplomacy in an Age of Decline. Cambridge University Press. p. 432. ISBN 978-1-107-72938-4.
