= Eric Selbin =

Political sociologist

Eric Allyn Selbin
- Born: 1959 (age 66–67); Minnesota
- Occupation: university professor

Academic background
- Education: University of Minnesota
- Thesis: Societal transformation in social revolutions: The consolidation of the Nicaraguan Revolution (1991)

Academic work
- School or tradition: International relations
- Institutions: Southwestern University
- Main interests: Resistance, rebellion, social movements, international relations theory
- Notable works: Revolution, Rebellion, Resistance: The Power of Story
- Notable ideas: Revolutionary Stories

Eric Selbin is a political sociologist whose primary research interests are revolutions and related forms of collective behavior (resistance, rebellion, social movements) as well as critical international relations theory. Much of his work has focused on Latin America and the Caribbean, and his volume Modern Latin American Revolutions has been used as a textbook in courses in Latin American studies and contentious politics. He holds a PhD from the University of Minnesota and is professor of political science at Southwestern University in Georgetown, Texas, where he has also been appointed Brown Distinguished Research Professor (1999-2003) and University Scholar (2006-2014); in 2014, he was appointed to the Lucy King Brown Chair at Southwestern University. Since 2019, he has been a Faculty Associate at Observatorio de la Relación Binacional México - E.E.U.U., Faculty of Political and Social Sciences at the National University Autonomous of Mexico (UNAM).

From 2003-2006, Selbin held a joint appointment with Sweden's Umeå University as professor of peace and conflict students and at the Tallinn Postgraduate Summer School in Social and Cultural Studies in 2012. In 2013, Selbin was appointed a research fellow at the Teresa Lozano Long Institute of Latin American Studies (LLILAS) at the University of Texas at Austin. From 2004-2020, Selbin was co-editor of New Millennium Books in International Studies published by Rowman & Littlefield, from 2015-2020 Associate Editor of International Studies Perspectives (2015-2020), and served on the International Studies Association Publications Committee (2020-2022).

Selbin's most well-known work is Revolution, Rebellion, Resistance: The Power of Story (2010), also published in Arabic as ثورة تمرد المقاومة: قوة قصة (T2013), in German as Gerücht und Revolution: Von der Macht des Weitererzählens (2010), in India as Revolution, Rebellion, Resistance: The Power of Story (2011), in Persian as قدرت داستان مقاومت در برابر انقلاب شورش (n.d.), in Spanish as El poder del relato: Revolución, rebelión, Resistencia (2012), and in Turkish as Devrim Isyan Direnis: Hikayenin Gücü (2019). Selbin puts forth four different types of "revolutionary story" that have accompanied revolutionary struggles from the French Revolution to the present day: civilizing and democratizing, the social revolution, freedom and liberation, and the lost and forgotten. For Selbin, these narratives, conducted across time and space through processes of myth, memory and mimesis and daring acts of bricolage, are the crucible of revolutionary action.

Selbin has also collaborated with Helen Cordes, the writer, editor, and public historian to whom he is married, on topics related to homeschooling and feminism, as well as music and social change.

== Selected publications ==
- Revolution, Rebellion, Resistance: The Power of Story (2010), also published in Arabic as ثورة تمرد المقاومة: قوة قصة (NCT, 2013), in German as Gerücht und Revolution: Von der Macht des Weitererzählens (WGB, 2010), in India as Revolution, Rebellion, Resistance: The Power of Story (Books for Change, 2011), in Persian as قدرت داستان مقاومت در برابر انقلاب شورش (University of Tehran, n.d.), in Spanish as El poder del relato: Revolución, rebelión, Resistencia (Interzona Editoria, 2012), and in Turkish as Devrim Isyan Direnis: Hikayenin Gücü (Abis Yayinlari, 2019).
- Decentering International Relations (2010), co-authored with Meghana Nayak, Zed Books.
- Modern Latin American Revolutions (1993), Westview.

== Recent articles and book chapters ==
- “Revolution,” in Mlada Bukovansky, Edward Keene, Maja Spanu, & Chris Reus-Smit, eds. The Oxford Handbook on History and International Relations. Oxford: Oxford University Press, 2023.
- “El Che: The (Im)possibilities of a Political Symbol,” in Benjamin Abrams & Peter Gardner, eds. Symbolic Objects in Contentious Politics. Ann Arbor: University of Michigan Press, 2023.
- “All Around the World: Revolutionary Potential in the Age of Authoritarian Revanchism,” in J. Goldstone, L. Grinin, & A. Korotayev, eds., Handbook of Revolutions in the 21st Century: The New Waves of Revolutions, and the Causes and Effects of Disruptive Political Change. 2022.
- “Resistance and Revolution in the Age of Authoritarian Revanchism: The Power of Revolutionary Imaginaries in the Austerity-Security State Era,” Millennium, vol. 47, no. 3 (2019).
- “Singing Resistance, Rebellion and Revolution into Being: Collective Political Action and Song,” with Helen Cordes, in Olaf Kaltmeier & Wilfried Raussert, eds. Sonic Politics: Music and Social Movement in the Americas 1960s to the Present. New York: Routledge, 2019.
- “Is This the Educational System You Wanted? Feminism and Homeschooling.” Co- authored with Helen Cordes, Jesse Cordes Selbin, and Zoe Cordes Selbin, in R. Teske and M.A. Tétreault, eds. Partial Truths and the Politics of Community: Feminist Approaches to Social Movements, Community, and Power, Vol. 2. Columbia: University of South Carolina Press, 2003, pp. 89–103.
