= Eastern Orthodoxy in Europe =

Presence of Eastern Orthodoxy Christianity in Europe

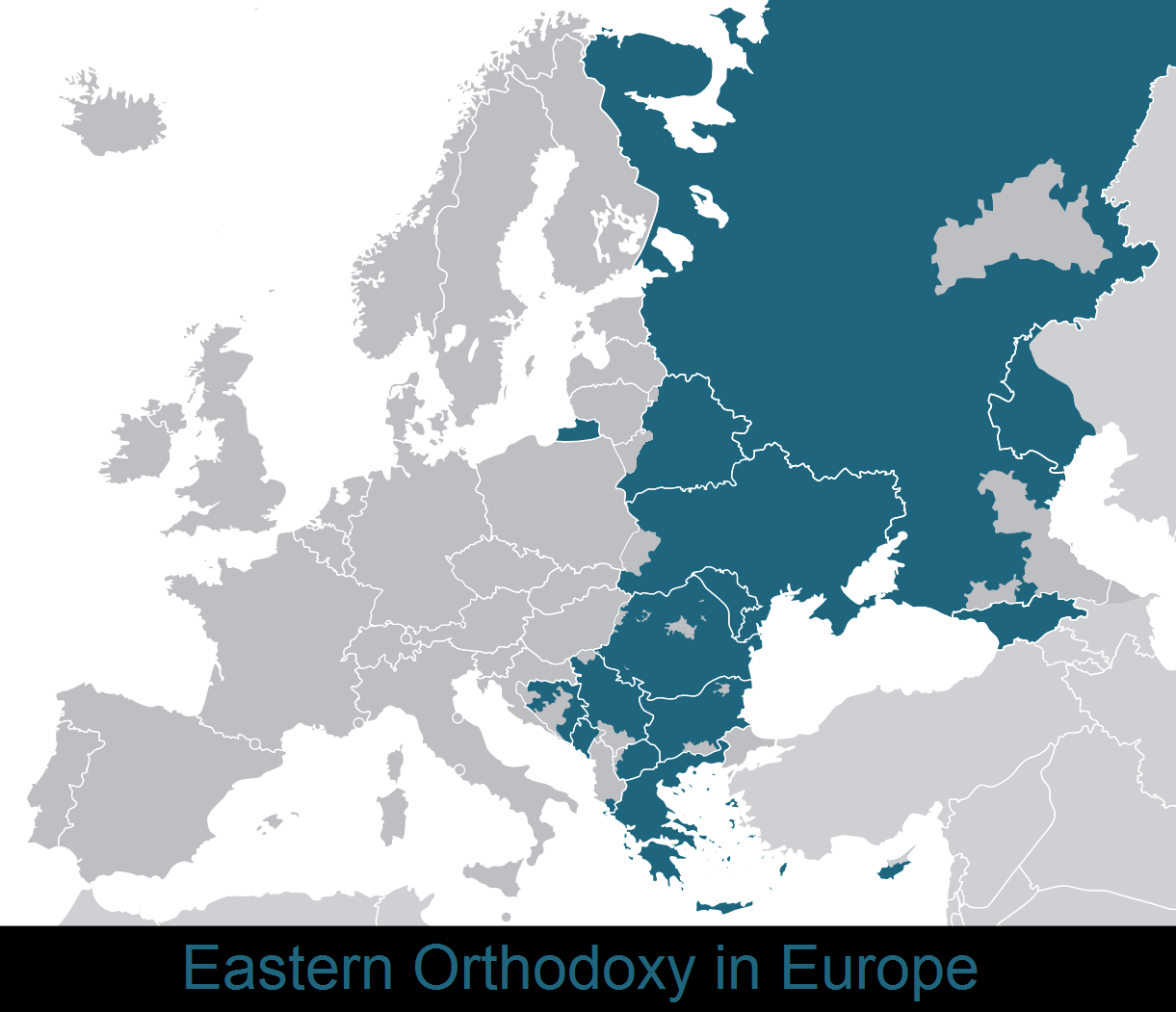
Eastern Orthodoxy in Europe

Eastern Orthodoxy constitutes the second largest Christian denomination in Europe. Eastern Orthodox Christians are predominantly present in Eastern and Southeastern Europe, and they are also significantly represented in diaspora throughout the Continent. The term "Eastern Orthodox Europe" is informally used to describe the predominantly Eastern Orthodox countries of Belarus, Bulgaria, Cyprus, Georgia, Greece, Moldova, Montenegro, North Macedonia, Romania, Russia, Serbia, and Ukraine.

== Eastern Orthodox majority countries ==
- Eastern Orthodoxy in Moldova, 94.3% (2024 census)
- Eastern Orthodoxy in Greece, 90% (2022 est.)
- Eastern Orthodoxy in Georgia, 83.4% (2014 census)
- Eastern Orthodoxy in Serbia, 81.1% (2022 census)
- Eastern Orthodoxy in Cyprus, 74.5% (2021 census)
- Eastern Orthodoxy in Romania, 73.4% (2021 census)
- Eastern Orthodoxy in Belarus, 73.3% (2011 est.)
- Eastern Orthodoxy in Ukraine, 72% (2022 est.)
- Eastern Orthodoxy in Montenegro, 71.1% (2023 census)
- Eastern Orthodoxy in Bulgaria, 62.7% (2021 census)
- Eastern Orthodoxy in Russia, 61% (2026 est.)
- Eastern Orthodoxy in North Macedonia, 46.1% (2021 census)

== Eastern Orthodox minority countries ==
- Eastern Orthodoxy in Bosnia and Herzegovina, 30.7% (2013 census)
- Eastern Orthodoxy in Estonia, 16.3% (2021 census)
- Eastern Orthodoxy in Latvia, 13.3% (2019 est.)
- Eastern Orthodoxy in Albania, 7.2% (2023 census)
- Eastern Orthodoxy in Austria, 4.9% (2021 census)
- Eastern Orthodoxy in Lithuania, 4.4% (2021 census)
- Eastern Orthodoxy in Slovenia, 3.7% (2019 est.)
- Eastern Orthodoxy in Croatia, 3.3% (2021 census)
- Eastern Orthodoxy in Italy, 3% (2023 est.)
- Eastern Orthodoxy in Germany, 1.5% (2024 est.)
- Eastern Orthodoxy in Finland, 1% (2025 census)

== See also ==
- Byzantine commonwealth

== Sources ==
- Victoria Clark (21 November 2011). Why Angels Fall: A Journey Through Orthodox Europe from Byzantium to Kosovo. Pan Macmillan. ISBN 978-1-4472-1639-1.
- Jonathan Shepard (2007). The Expansion of Orthodox Europe: Byzantium, the Balkans and Russia. Ashgate Variorum. ISBN 978-0-7546-5920-4.
- Jonathan Sutton; William Peter van den Bercken (2003). Orthodox Christianity and Contemporary Europe: Selected Papers of the International Conference Held at the University of Leeds, England, in June 2001. Peeters Publishers. pp. 92–. ISBN 978-90-429-1266-3.
- Alexandru Duţu (1 January 1998). Political Models and National Identities in "Orthodox Europe". Babel. ISBN 978-973-48-1042-0.
- Kiminas, Demetrius (2009). The Ecumenical Patriarchate: A History of Its Metropolitanates with Annotated Hierarch Catalogs. Wildside Press LLC. ISBN 9781434458766.
- Obolensky, Dimitri (1974) [1971]. The Byzantine Commonwealth: Eastern Europe, 500-1453. London: Cardinal. ISBN 9780351176449.
- Ostrogorsky, George (1956). History of the Byzantine State. Oxford: Basil Blackwell.
